= Europeans in Oceania =

Total population
- 26,000,000; 62% of Oceania's population (2018)

Regions with significant populations
- Australia, New Zealand, New Caledonia and Hawaii

Languages
- Predominantly English, French and Spanish

Religion
- Christianity (Anglicanism/Protestantism and Catholicism) and Judaism

Related ethnic groups
- European diaspora

European exploration and settlement of Oceania began in the 16th century, starting with the Spanish (Castilian) landings and shipwrecks in the Mariana Islands, east of the Philippines. This was followed by the Portuguese landing and settling temporarily (due to the monsoons) in some of the Caroline Islands and Papua New Guinea. Several Spanish landings in the Caroline Islands and New Guinea came after. Subsequent rivalry between European colonial powers, trade opportunities and Christian missions drove further European exploration and eventual settlement. After the 17th century Dutch landings in New Zealand and Australia, with no settlement in these lands, the British became the dominant colonial power in the region, establishing settler colonies in what would become Australia and New Zealand, both of which now have majority European-descended populations. British exploration of Oceania increased in the late 18th century, particularly through the voyages of James Cook between 1768 and 1779, which resulted in detailed mapping of the Pacific region. States including New Caledonia (Caldoche), Hawaii, French Polynesia, and Norfolk Island also have considerable European populations. Europeans remain a primary ethnic group in much of Oceania, both numerically and economically.

The areas covered in this article follow the guidelines set out by list of sovereign states and dependent territories in Oceania.

== European settlement and colonization ==
=== Australasia ===
==== Australia and New Zealand ====
European settlement in Australia began in 1788 when the British established the Crown Colony of New South Wales with the first settlement at Port Jackson. New Zealand was part of New South Wales until 1840 when it became a separate colony and experienced a marked increase in European settlement.

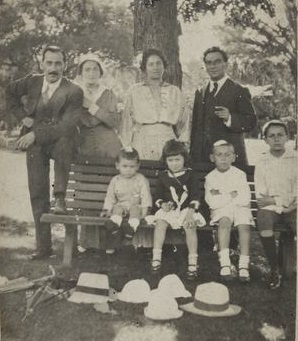
A migrant family from Minsk, Belarus in Melbourne, c. 1915–1916. They were likely recorded as Russians rather than Belarusians.

While the largest European ethnic group to originally settle in both Australia and New Zealand were the English, the settler population in Australia from early times contained a large Irish Catholic component, in contrast to New Zealand which was more Scottish in composition.

For generations, the vast majority of both colonial-era settlers and post-independence immigrants to Australia and New Zealand came primarily from the British Isles. However, waves of European immigrants were later drawn from a broader range of countries. Australia, in particular, received large numbers of European immigrants from countries such as Italy, Greece, Germany, Malta, the Netherlands and Yugoslavia following the Second World War. Today, Australia has the largest Maltese population outside of Malta itself. Up until the 1940s, fellow Anglosphere colony the United States had received more migrants from areas such as Southern Europe when compared to Australia. A number of factors contributed to Australia's lower numbers, including the longer distance, the lack of industries in Australia at the time and because the Australian government were only able to cover travel costs for British migrants.

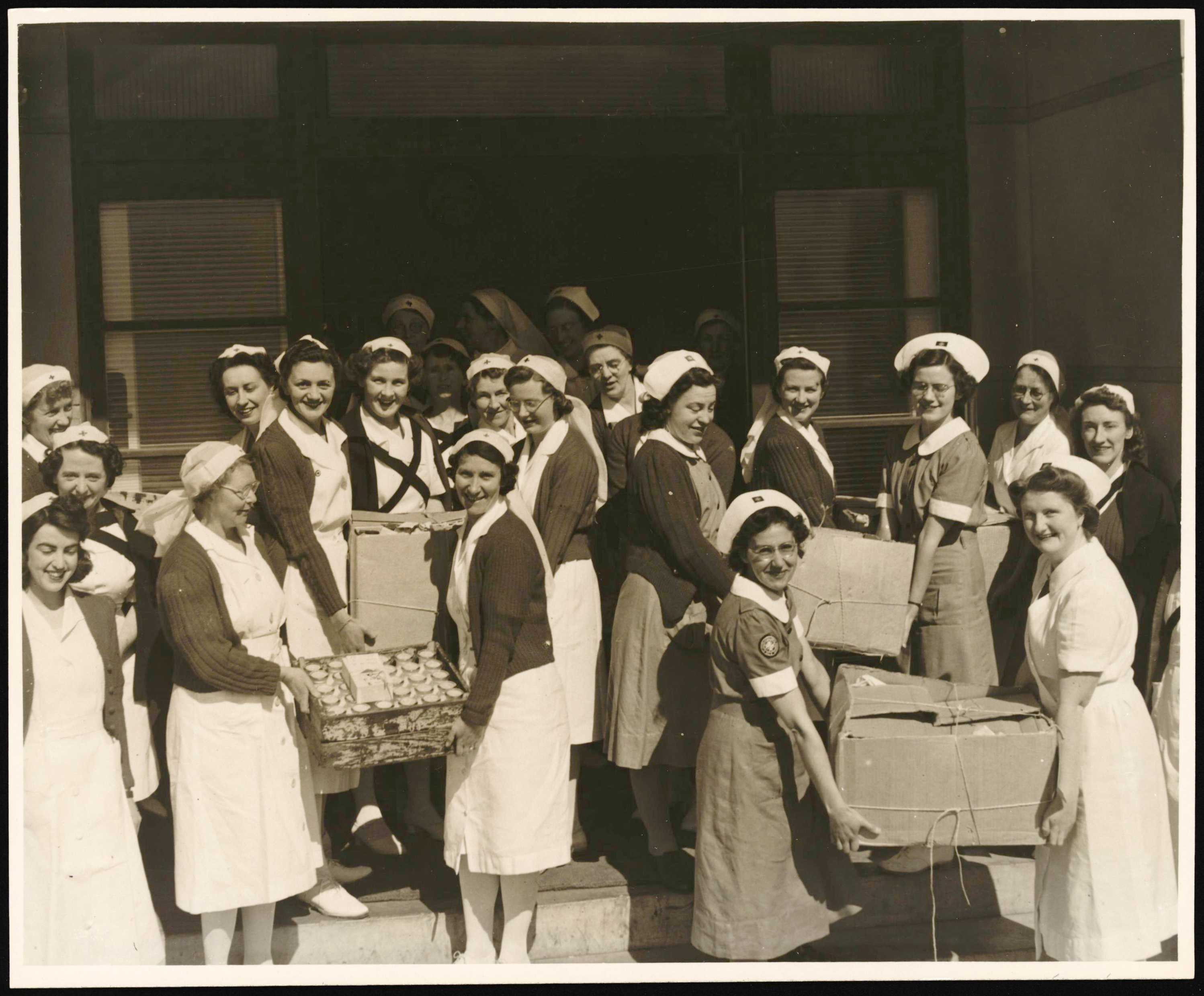
Polish refugees in Wellington, New Zealand, 1944.

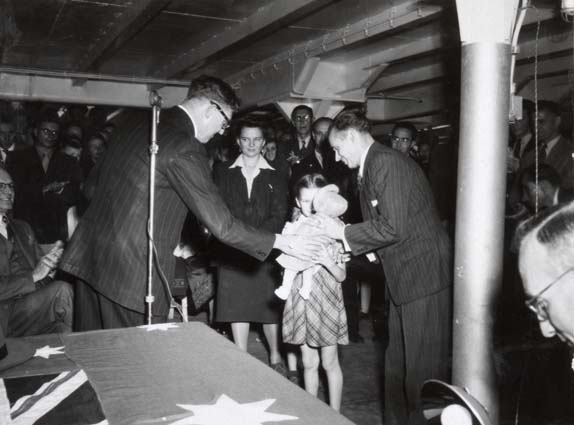
Child immigrant Maira Kalnins in August 1949. Kalnins was travelling with her family to start a new life in Australia after the postwar occupation of her native Latvia by Russian forces. Her photogenic qualities won her the role as the central figure in a publicity campaign to mark the 50,000th new arrival in Australia.

Between the end of World War II and 1955 alone, 850,000 Europeans came to Australia, including 171,000 "Displaced persons", war-time and post-war emigrants resettled in the country by arrangement with the International Refugee Organization. These immigrants were scattered in both urban and rural areas throughout Australia. Assimilation policies of the 1940s and 1950s required new continental European arrivals to learn English, adopt to pre-existing European Australian cultural practices and become indistinguishable from the Australian-born population as quickly as possible. This was also the case in New Zealand, with their government believing that continental Europeans could easily assimilate to the pre-existing culture. The Australian-born population were often encouraged to forge friendships with the new arrivals. For example, in 1950 the New South Wales State Minister for Immigration publicly requested residents of Goulburn to invite new Australians into their homes on Australia Day. The suggestion was supported by Christian churches in the city. A government program known as the Good Neighbour Council operated in Australian communities, with the specific aim of encouraging locals to establish friendships with post-World War II immigrants. The New Settlers League, formed after World War I, was a collaboration between the government and civil society, and served many of the same purposes as the Good Neighbour Council around this time. It assisted new Australian immigrants not only in assimilating, but also in finding employment.

By the time restrictions on non-white immigration began being lifted in the late 1960s, the governments had already moved towards a policy of integration, where new immigrants were allowed to retain their original cultural identities. This echoed developments in other immigrant-receiving countries outside of Oceania, notably Canada. James Forrest and Michael Poulsen from Macquarie University wrote in 2003, "the melting pot approach did not properly grasp the full nature of the processes involved. In the United States this led to a realization that, as many ethnic minority groups were assimilated, losing original sources of differentiation like language and culture, they were in fact reconstituted as something else while remaining as [an] identifiable group. In Australia and Canada, the new perspective resolved around multiculturalism, focusing on the positive aspects of ethnic diversity and the identity of migrant groups."

In March 2022, the Australian government granted temporary visas to approximately 5,000 Ukrainians fleeing the Russian invasion of their country.

The current top 25 European ethnic groups in Australia as of 2016 are as follows:

| European ethnicity | Population in Australia (2016) |
|---|---|
| English Australians (Note: Generally used to describe later English arrivals in Australia.) | 7,852,221 |
| Australians (Note: Generally used to describe descendants of early British settlers.) | 7,298,238 |
| Irish Australians | 2,388,058 |
| Scottish Australians | 2,023,460 |
| Italian Australians | 1,000,013 |
| German Australians | 982,230 |
| Greek Australians | 397,435 |
| Dutch Australians | 339,547 |
| Polish Australians | 183,968 |
| Maltese Australians | 175,563 |
| Welsh Australians | 144,589 |
| French Australians | 135,384 |
| Croatian Australians | 133,264 |
| Spanish Australians | 119,957 |
| Serbian Australians | 104,549 |
| Macedonian Australians | 98,437 |
| Russian Australians | 85,646 |
| Hungarian Australians | 73,613 |
| Portuguese Australians | 61,890 |
| Danish Australians | 59,292 |
| Ukrainian Australians | 46,192 |
| Austrian Australians | 44,408 |
| Swedish Australians | 40,216 |
| Swiss Australians | 31,560 |
| Cypriot Australians | 29,005 |

This list excludes outside ethnicities often associated with Europeans (such as American Australians and Canadian Australians) as well as transcontinental ethnicities which are generally considered to be Asian (such as Armenian Australians and Turkish Australians).

==== Christmas Island ====
The first European sighting of the island is believed to have been in 1616 by Richard Rowe, master of the Thomas ship. It was later sighted on Christmas Day 1643 by Captain William Mynors of the British East India Company, who named it Christmas Island.

The earliest known landing occurred in 1688, when the English ship Cygnet arrived near the Dales wetland on the island's west coast. No human inhabitation was found. Explorer William Dampier was on board, and recorded how some of the crew brought large coconut crabs back to the ship to eat. Crew of the vessel Amethyst made an unsuccessful attempt to explore the island in 1857, being hampered by inland cliffs and dense jungle.

In 1887, a party from British naval vessel HMS Egeria made their way through the dense jungle to reach the summit of what is now Murray Hill. In the process they became the first to discover the island's phosphate reserves. Specimens of soil and rock were collected by the men of HMS Egeria; the Scottish naturalist John Murray analyzed the specimens and confirmed that they were phosphate of lime. On 6 June 1888, Britain annexed Christmas Island at the urging of John Murray.

That same year Scott George Clunies-Ross, owner of the Cocos (Keeling) Islands, sent his brother Andrew and a small party of Cocos Malay workers to form a settlement at Flying Fish Cove (the present-day capital of Christmas Island). This was in order to pre-empt any other claim to the island's resources. Britain offered both Murray and Clunies-Ross a joint phosphate lease until the year 1990. The parties agreed, with the lease allowing them to mine phosphate and cut timber on the island. In 1897, the Christmas Island Phosphate Company was formed, being largely owned by the former lessees. A year later, 200 Chinese laborers, eight European managers and five Sikh policemen arrive on the island to make up a workforce, supplemented by a small number of Malays.

The first major shipment of phosphate occurred in 1900. Between 1900 and 1904, 550 people on the island died from thiamine deficiency. Charles William Andrews of the British Museum conducted a comprehensive study of the island's natural history in 1908, following on from an earlier study he had conducted. Phosphate mining was reduced during World War I.

The island's rich phosphate reserves and strategic location made it a target for the Japanese during World War II. On 21 January 1942, a Norwegian ship being loaded with phosphate for Australia was hit by torpedoes fired from a Japanese submarine, which led to it sinking near the northern coast. Women and children from 50 Asian and European families were evacuated to the Western Australian city of Perth soon afterwards. Prior to World War II, the Dutch and British had an agreement to develop a seaplane base on Christmas Island, but it was never used at the start of the War due to inadequate Dutch resources.

On 31 March 1942, approximately 850 Japanese troops arrived by sea and took over the island. Many of the Asian workers had fled into the jungle when the Japanese arrived, living off crabs and birds. The Japanese restarted phosphate operations for the Empire of Japan, imprisoning remaining Europeans and hunting down the 1,000 Chinese and Malays hiding in the jungle. Most of the Chinese and Malay were captured by the Japanese and put into forced labor. Bombing by Allied forces and acts of sabotage by the islanders meant that very little phosphate was actually exported to Japan. Nearly two-thirds of the island's population (including the Europeans) were sent to prison camps in Indonesia when food supplies began running out during late 1943.

The remaining Japanese troops were also sent to Indonesia when Japan surrendered the island in August 1945. It was reoccupied by the British in October the same year. Australia and New Zealand purchased the Christmas Island Phosphate company in 1949, and the British Phosphate Commission managed mining operations for both governments. Administrative responsibility also shifted from the United Kingdom to the British colony of Singapore. The post-war inhabitants continued to be a mix of Asian and European ethnicities, with their children being segregated from each other in education. Ethnically segregated schools were later abolished, despite fears from the Europeans that this would lead to a decline in teaching quality. Sovereignty of Christmas Island was transferred from Singapore and the United Kingdom to Australia in 1958. The Australian government paid Singapore £2,800,000 as compensation for lost future phosphate revenue. It became one of Australia's most geographically distant territories, being 2,600 kilometers removed from the mainland's west coast.

In August 2001, Australian troops boarded the Norwegian freighter MV Tampa off Christmas Island. The commander of the vessel, Captain Arne Rinnan, had rescued hundreds of mainly Afghan Hazara asylum seekers from a stranded Indonesian human smuggling vessel, and was attempting to bring them to the Australian mainland. They were denied entry by the Australian prime minister John Howard, with the subsequent political upheaval becoming known as the Tampa Affair. The Tampa Affair was the catalyst for Australia's current border protection policies, and also became a pivotal issue in the 2001 Australian federal election. In late 2001, Australia began using Christmas Island, Nauru and Papua New Guinea's Manus Island as detention centers for asylum seekers.

An Australian mental health nurse from Perth was sacked in 2011, after having sexual relations with a suicidal asylum seeker whom she had been treating on Christmas Island. The nurse's initial March 2011 consultation with the detainee found he was at risk of self-harm and had previously tried to kill himself. The nurse saw the detainee five times before she left the island for a one-month break at the end of April 2011. During her break she remained in email contact with him. She returned to the island a month later and saw the patient three more times before he was granted a visa and transferred to Queensland. By late July 2011, the pair had met up again in Perth and engaged in a sexual relationship. The relationship was exposed to co-workers when the nurse brought him back to Christmas Island and lived in the same accommodation with him. In October 2012, a security guard at the detention center was also sacked for having a sexual relationship with a detainee. The guard was employed by Serco, the British company which managed the center.

The current ethnic makeup of Christmas Island is drastically different to that of mainland Australia, with the population primarily consisting of Europeans (29% or 460 of the population), Chinese and Malays, in addition to smaller numbers of Indians and Eurasians. As a result, it is considered a highly multicultural area. The Chinese and Malay residents feel less connection to the mainland than the European residents, who are mostly from Australia and New Zealand.

==== Cocos (Keeling) Islands ====
The Cocos (Keeling) Islands are an Australian external territory located in the Indian Ocean, comprising a small archipelago approximately midway between Australia and Sri Lanka and relatively close to the Indonesian island of Sumatra. The territory's dual name (official since the islands' incorporation into Australia in 1955) reflects that the islands have historically been known as either the Cocos Islands or the Keeling Islands.

The archipelago was discovered in 1609 by Captain William Keeling of the East India Company. In 1825, Scottish merchant seaman Captain John Clunies-Ross stopped briefly at the islands on a trip to India, nailing up a Union Jack and planning to return and settle on the islands with his family in the future. Wealthy Englishman Alexander Hare had similar plans, and hired a captain – coincidentally, Clunies-Ross's brother – to bring him and a volunteer harem of 40 Malay women to the islands, where he hoped to establish his private residence. Clunies-Ross returned two years later with his wife, children and mother-in-law, and found Hare already established on the island and living with the private harem. A feud grew between the two. Clunies-Ross's eight sailors "began at once the invasion of the new kingdom to take possession of it, women and all".

After some time, Hare's women began deserting him, and instead finding themselves partners amongst Clunies-Ross's sailors. Disheartened, Hare left the island. Encouraged by members of the former harem, Clunies-Ross then recruited Malays to come to the island for work and wives. The islands were annexed by the British Empire in 1857. This annexation was carried out by Captain Stephen Grenville Fremantle in command of HMS Juno. Fremantle claimed the islands for the British Empire and appointed Ross II as Superintendent. In 1878, by Letters Patent, the Governor of Ceylon was made Governor of the islands, and, by further Letters Patent in 1886, responsibility for the islands was transferred to the Governor of the Straits Settlement to exercise his functions as "Governor of Cocos Islands".

The islands were made part of the Straits Settlement under an Order in Council of 20 May 1903. Meanwhile, in 1886 Queen Victoria had, by indenture, granted the islands in perpetuity to John Clunies-Ross. The head of the family enjoyed semi-official status as Resident Magistrate and Government representative.

==== Norfolk Island ====
Archaeological findings reveal the island was inhabited by Polynesians between the 15th and 16th centuries. It is unknown why their settlement ended. In 1774, Captain James Cook became the first European to discover the island while on his second voyage to the South Pacific. Cook named the Island after the Duchess of Norfolk in England.

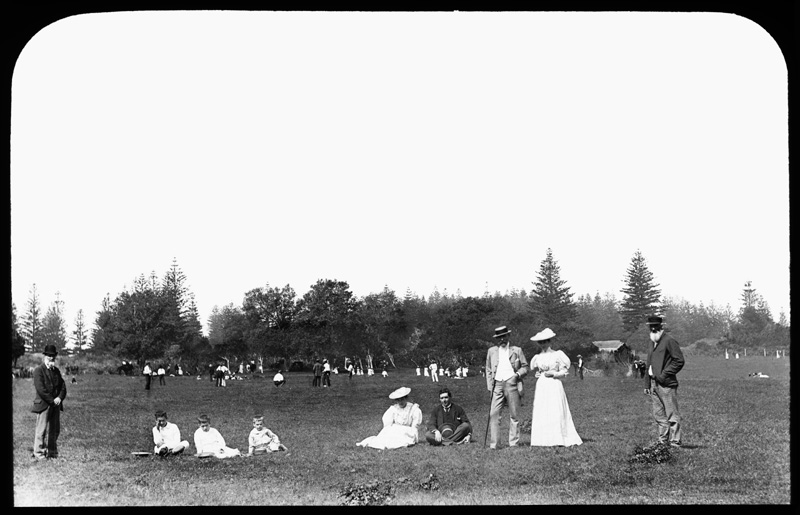
Norfolk Islanders gathering at a cricket match in November 1908.

Norfolk was settled by the British in March 1788, merely five weeks after the First Fleet of convicts arrived in Sydney, New South Wales. They viewed the island's pines as being useful for ships masts and the local flax as good for sails. The island's climate made it ideal for agriculture and farming, and Sydney came to be reliant on Norfolk for food.

Convicts and free settlers inhabited the island up until 1814, when the island was abandoned due to dangerous landing sites, feelings of isolation, and the growth of the Australian colony in general. A second convict settlement started in 1825, which saw the island become infamous across the world for the harsh treatment of prisoners. Convict transportation to New South Wales ceased in the early 1850s and the settlement was mostly abandoned, with only 11 people remaining by 1855.

On 8 June 1856, Anglo-Tahitians from Pitcairn were relocated to Norfolk due to overpopulation on their islands. They and the remaining 11 from 1855 were the island's main inhabitants from there on. Their mixed race descendants make up a significant number of Norfolk's current 2,000 or so residents.

Janelle Patton, a 29 year old European Australian woman from Sydney, was violently murdered on Norfolk Island during Easter Sunday in 2002. The murder happened while Patton was on a morning walk, with the killer incurring 64 stab wounds. Her case attracted significant media attention in Australia and New Zealand, partly because she was the first person to be murdered on the island since 1893 (others claimed it was the first murder in Norfolk's history). In 2006, European New Zealander chef Glenn Peter Charles McNeill was arrested for her murder near the city of Nelson, on the South Island of New Zealand, after being identified by an Australian Federal Police investigation.

=== Melanesia ===
==== New Caledonia ====
New Caledonia's archipelago was originally inhabited by a Melanesian group known as the Kanaks around 3000 BCE. Aside from rare Polynesian voyagers, they were likely isolated from the outside world up until European arrival.

Captain James Cook became the first European to discover it on 4 September 1774, christening the area "New Caledonia". He chose the name because the mountainous scenery of Grande Terre reminded him of Scotland (Caledonia being Latin nomenclature for Scotland). Cook noted that the inhabitants were Melanesians, and believed it to be the largest island in the South Pacific after New Zealand. Before he left, Cook got his painter William Hodges to draw a portrait of what the typical male and female inhabitants looked like, as he had previously done while in Vanuatu two months prior. The drawings have since been described as "highly competent works, but wholly impersonal", as though the Melanesian people hadn't made any kind of impression on him.

New Caledonia was rarely frequented by Europeans prior to the 1830s. Oceanian islands within the Melanesian region were ignored due to the poor reputation of the inhabitants; they were seen as being violent towards outsiders, and were known to practice cannibalism.

The early pioneers of colonization in New Caledonia were predominantly British. Up until the mid-1850s, the archipelago maintained close ties with the neighboring Australian colonies, and the first birth recorded was that of a child born to English parents. The Englishman James Paddon, who bought Nouméa from Chief Kuindo in 1845, is considered to be the first European settler of the archipelago. Paddon established sandalwood trading posts on the Loyalty Islands, in Anatom (part of Vanuatu), the Isle of Pines, then finally on Grande Terre. He initiated regular exchanges between these islands, Australia and China, in addition to developing a postal service between Nouméa and Sydney. Around this time, Christian missionaries from New Caledonia travelled to Vanuatu to try to convert the natives, who were also Melanesian like the Kanaks. These attempts were unsuccessful, and usually resulted in death.

In the 19th century, sexual liaisons between European sailors and native Oceanian women were very common, particularly in New Zealand and Tahiti. However, this was not the case for most of New Caledonia, with local cultural norms often forbidding such acts of promiscuity. The islands of Maré and Lifou tended to have women who were less self-conscious about cultural norms. Some swam out to ships and posed erotically in the water for the sailors. Even married women from these islands were known to go with sailors into their cabins.

On 24 September 1853, Admiral Febvrier Despointes annexed New Caledonia on behalf of France, in order to forestall any potential move by the British. Paddon's trading posts ceased to exist not long afterwards. Napoleon III of France ordered a decree to make New Caledonia a penal colony on 2 September 1863. The penal colony officially began in 1864, with the first convoy of transported convicts arriving in Nouméa on 9 May. Approximately 5,000 French political prisoners were sent during the first year of operation. The significant distance between Europe and Oceania made New Caledonia an ideal location for opponents to the various regimes which rose to power in France following the French Revolution of 1848. Convicts often suffered from emotional isolation, boredom, and a lack of communication with France.

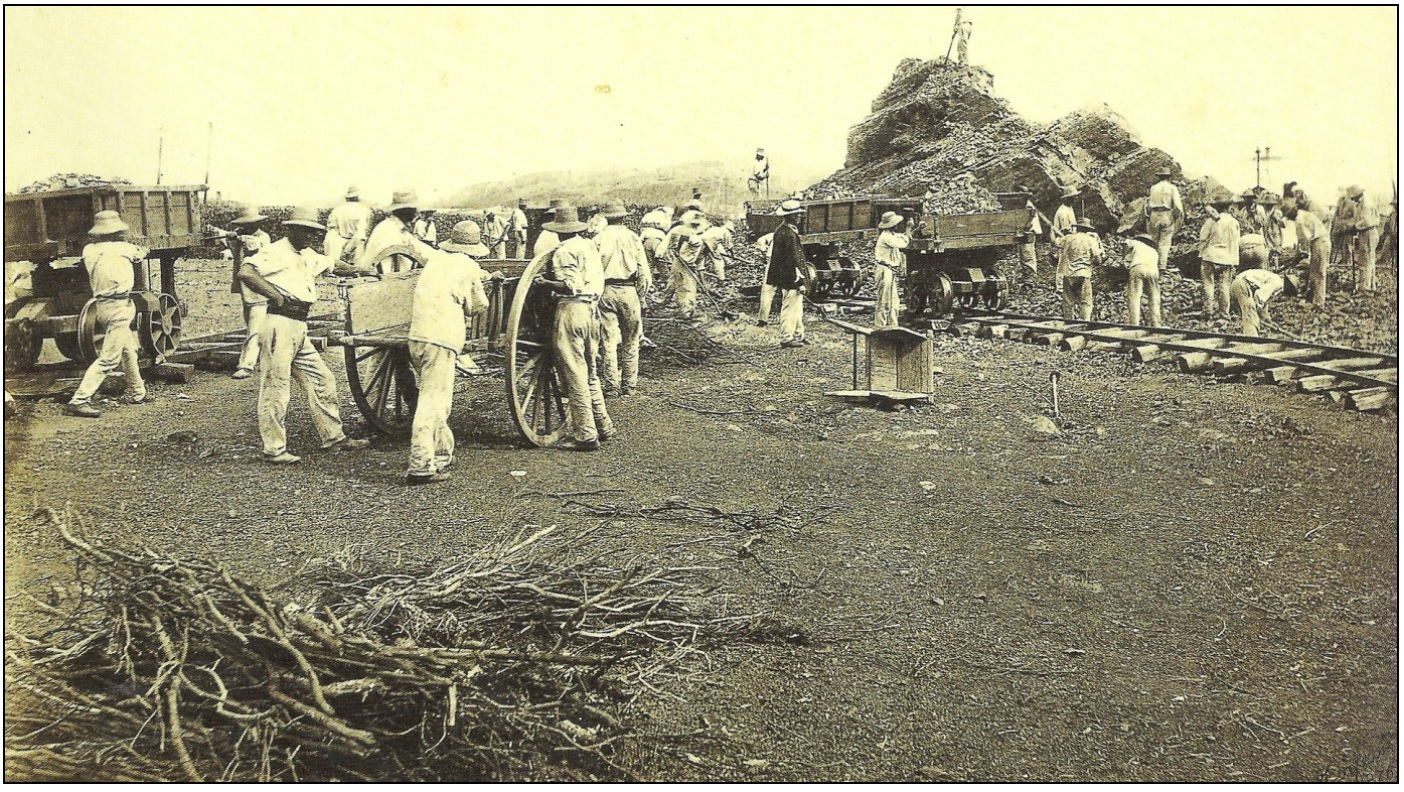
French convicts on a construction site in Nouméa, c. 1900.

A New Caledonian prison warden, c. 1906.

The country forced both male and female convicts to remain in New Caledonia for a period equivalent to the duration of their prison sentence, the aim of this being primarily to boost their colony's overall population. Of the first 4,500 convicts sent, only 20 were women. Cut off from family and loved ones, they languished in an overwhelmingly male environment. In their first year or two, some managed to establish sexual relations with the Kanak population on the Isle of Pines. Missionaries working in New Caledonia were eventually able to convince authorities to prohibit contact between the female convicts and the Kanaks. The French women on the Isle of Pines also offered themselves sexually to the male prisoners, but this promiscuity did not substitute for familial attachment. Prisoner Henri Messager reported in 1878 that of 30 French women, "twenty-five serve five hundred men, and this under the eyes of their husbands... it's disgusting".

Convicts had stopped being sent to New Caledonia by the beginning of the 20th century; rising tensions between the Kanaks and colonizers have been cited as a reason for this decision. All the penitentiary centers were gradually phased out during the early portion of that century. Repatriations for the ex-convicts commenced in 1947. Between 1942 and 1945, New Caledonia became the headquarters for America's armed forces during their Solomon Islands campaign of World War II. The US military helped employ around 1,500 Kanaks out of an indigenous population of about 30,000. In May 1942, The New York Times claimed that the Kanaks had more or less enlisted themselves into their nation's military. The Americans had a positive economic, political, and cultural impact on the Kanak population, but caused a suspicion among French officials, who viewed it as an occupation and a threat to their colonial dominance in New Caledonia.

New Caledonia remains a territory of France, despite several independence movements, and racial tension continues to exist among the Europeans and native Kanaks. This was evidenced by a controversial ad created during a 2021 referendum on New Caledonia's independence, which was accused of depicting Kanaks as having no mastery of French language and with accents that signified a "primitive and uncultivated state".

Currently, 27.1% of the population or about 71,700 people of New Caledonia has European ancestry. The only countries or territories with a larger European population in Oceania are Australia, New Zealand, and Hawaii. European New Caledonians have been compared to European Australians, due to their shared convict backgrounds, and their large population in comparison to the rest of Oceania. Globalsecurity.org writes, "The French in New Caledonia considered that the island was their home. They liked to be called Caledonians. In this respect they were something like the Australians across the Coral Sea. Allowing for differences in language, religion, and custom, the French in New Caledonia had some of the same hearty friendliness and independence that characterized the Australians."

==== Papua ====
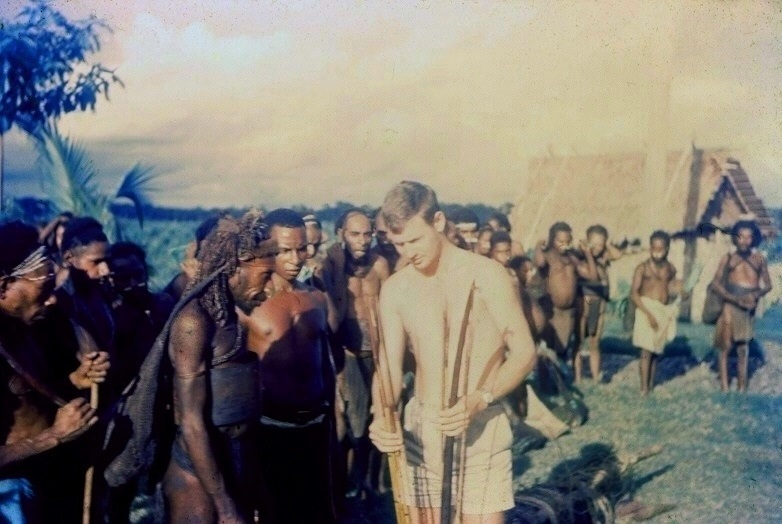
Australian patrol officer in the Australian-administered Territory of New Guinea in 1964

==== Vanuatu ====
Vanuatu is thought to have been settled by Austronesian-speaking Melanesians around 1200-1300 BC. Over a hundred different languages developed on its islands.

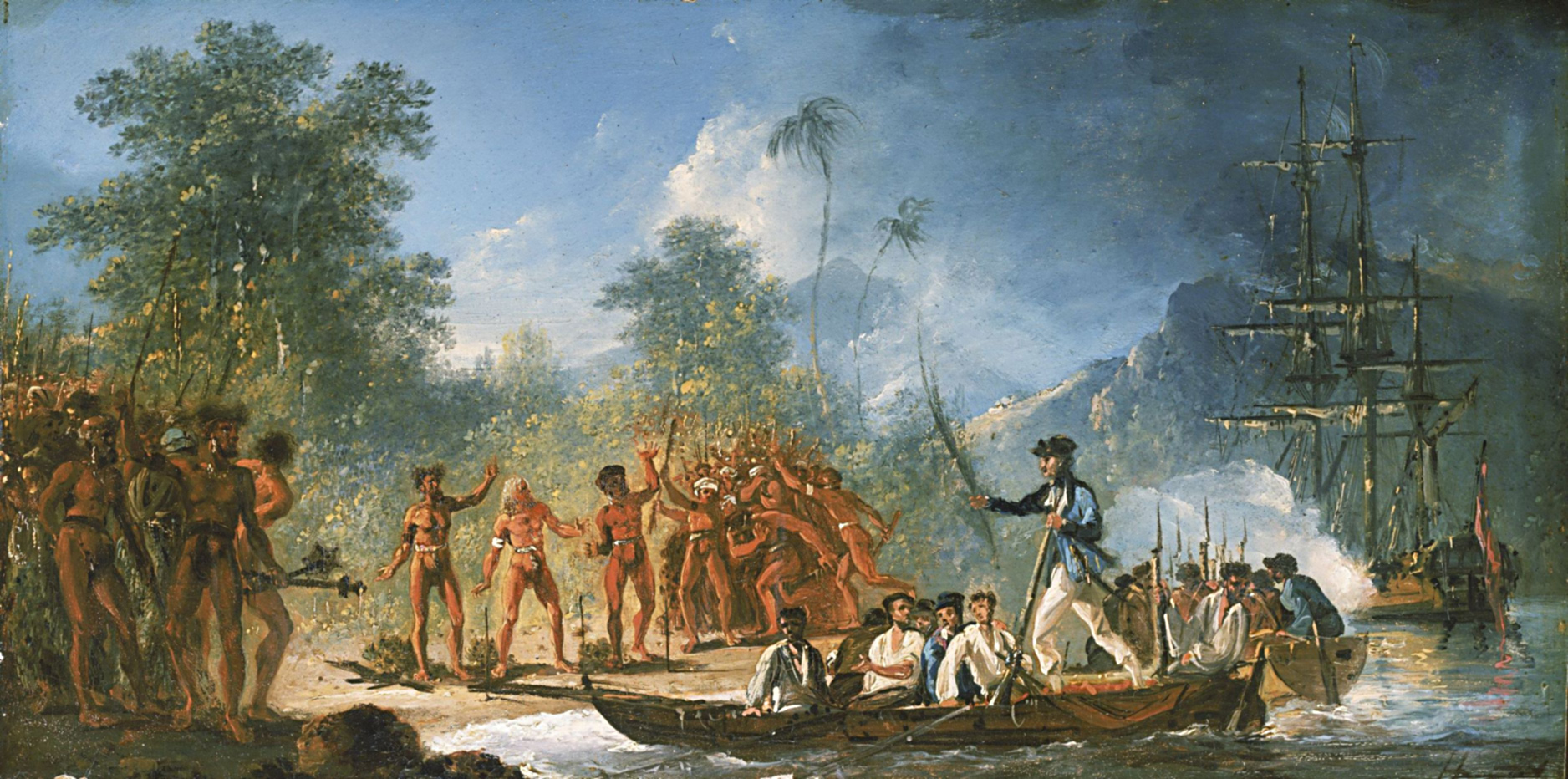
James Cook's landing on Tanna Island, as depicted by William Hodges.

In 1605, the Portuguese explorer Pedro Fernandes de Queirós became the first European to reach the islands of Vanuatu, believing it to be part of Terra Australis. In July 1774, a month after discovering the Polynesian island of Niue, Captain James Cook sailed west and explored the islands of Vanuatu, which he called the New Hebrides. He arrived on 17 July 1774, and was met with natives who were Melanesian rather than Polynesian, therefore having different customs. Cook noted the nudity of the men, whose testicles were quite exposed. He sailed past or visited nearly all the islands, including landfalls at Malekula, Tanna and Erromango. Cook's reception by the islanders was hostile. Upon landing at Erromango on 4 August 1774, his marines had to open fire when the natives tried to seize the boat and started to shoot missiles. Some of Cook's crew were slightly injured, while the leader of the islanders was killed, with several more natives being wounded.

Contact with Christian missionaries began in 1839. in November 1839, Rev. John Williams and fellow missionary James Harris were killed and eaten by cannibals on the island of Erromango, during an attempt to bring them the Gospel. The gruesome death of the well-known Williams caused missionaries to become cautious of Vanuatu. For the following decade, they often sent converted Polynesian missionaries rather than European missionaries. These Polynesians were regarded as a form of cannon fodder; if they survived, it meant Europeans could safely follow. In 1845, Polynesian teachers from Samoa landed on Efate, but most were killed within a few years. Around this time, Catholic, Presbyterian and Anglican missionaries from England and France made various attempts to convert Vanuatu. These were unsuccessful, and resulted in either death or a rapid retreat.

The first long-term mission settlement in Vanuatu was established on Aneityum in 1848 by Rev. John Geddie, with the support of the Presbyterian Church of the Lower Provinces of British North America (now known as the Presbyterian Church of Canada). Geddie lived in Aneityum as missionary for over four decades, and he ran the most successful early mission in Vanuatu. He was able to achieve widespread local conversion to Christianity during his time on the island. Geddie's success stemmed largely from his willingness to learn Aneityumese language and customs, and to adapt mission practice appropriately.

The Presbyterian Church sought to expand upon its success on Aneityum, stationing George Gordon and Ellen Gordon as missionaries on Erromango in 1857. The Canadian Church continued to be the main source of support for this new mission. However, the pair would be killed at Dillon's Bay in 1861, by warriors from a neighboring village. George's brother James Gordon, also a missionary, later came to Erromango. He arrived at Dillon's Bay in 1865, resettling in 1868 to Potnuma, near the large village of Port Narvin on the east side of the island. In 1872, James also died at the hands of natives. Less successful missionaries such as these generally had a poor understanding of local customs, had to learn local languages from scratch, and often suffered because of their lack of knowledge.

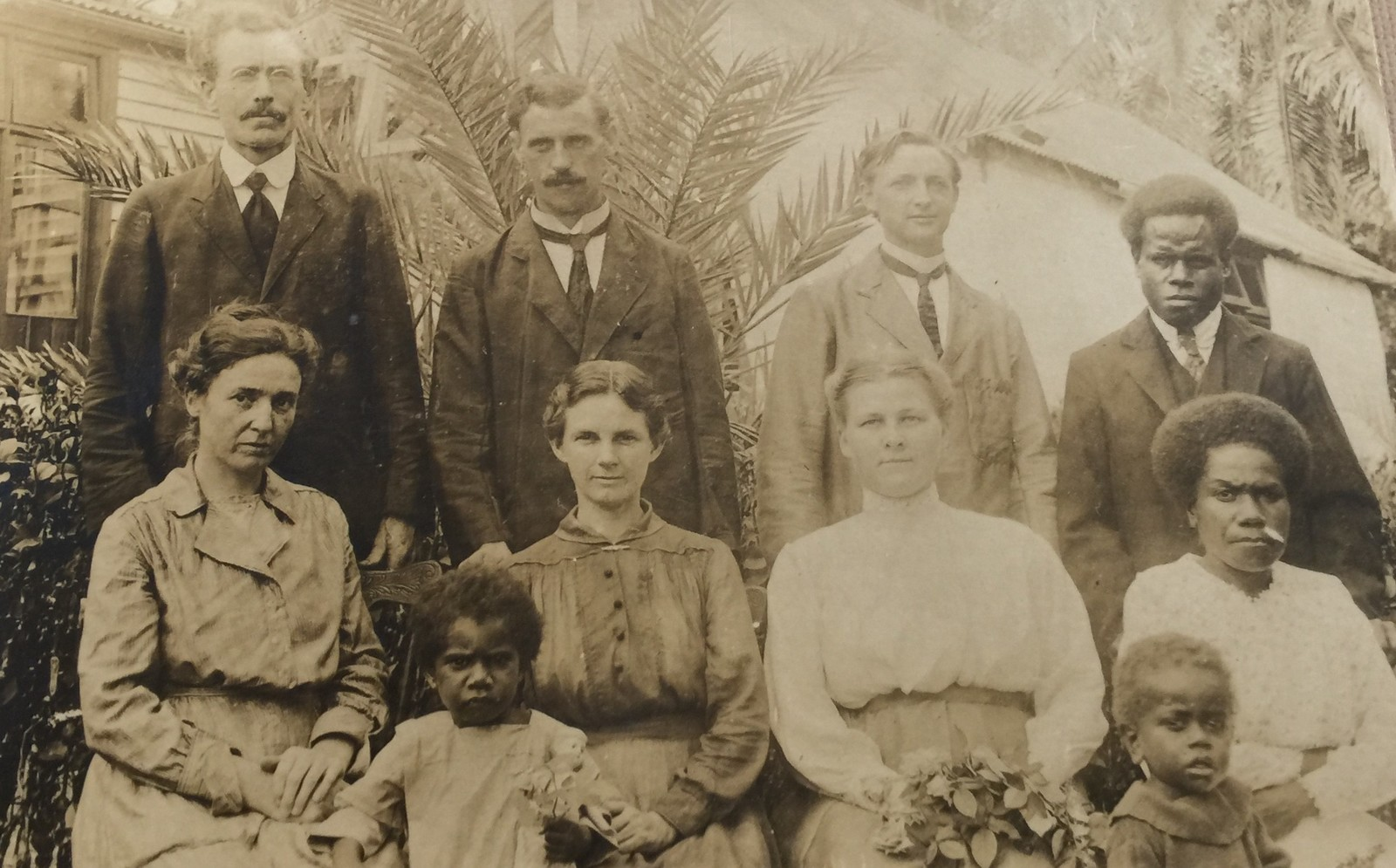
Australian missionaries in Malekula, Vanuatu, c. 1918.

The early 1870s saw the establishment of long-term missions outside of Aneityum. Among the missionaries were the Watts family at south Tanna and the Robertson family at Dillon's Bay. Both families would stay through the turn of the century, successfully converting large numbers of natives. During this period, missionaries began to invest in larger and more permanent infrastructure in their settlements. In 1882, Rev. William Gray, an Australian missionary, joined the Watts family on Tanna, settling at Waisisi.

In spite of their violent early interactions, the persistence of the missionaries had paid of, and there were various denominational mission stations throughout Vanuatu by the end of the 19th century. Many who converted to Christianity died, due to exposure from an entire range of diseases introduced by Europeans. These included influenza, pneumonia, measles, mumps, scarlet fever, smallpox, whooping cough and the common cold. Traditional medicines had proved effective in the past, but had no impact on these new diseases from Europe. Consequently, some natives considered the new religion and its God to be powerless in the face of disease. Others viewed all illnesses as stemming from sorcery.

Aside from the evangelization attempts, the 19th century also saw a depletion of Vanuatu's environmental resources by Europeans. Towards the end of that century, some inhabitants were kidnapped by Australians to work on farms in Queensland.

British and French naval ships dominated the waters off Vanuatu, their sole purpose being to keep out rival colonizers. In 1887, the islands began to be administered by a French-British naval commission, with the French and British agreeing to an Anglo-French condominium on Vanuatu in 1906. Over the next 76 years, British and French administrators ran separate police, education and other services. The 100,000 islanders, already separated by 110 different languages, were further divided into anglophones and francophones, much like in Canada.

Vanuatu became a sovereign nation in 1980. The islands of Vanuatu had very little contact with the United States prior to independence. Australia were among the first to recognize Vanuatu's independence, and the country continues to donate large amounts of aid. In 2019-20 alone they gave $91.7 million worth of ODA (Official Development Assistance) to Vanuatu.

=== Micronesia ===
==== Federated States of Micronesia ====
FS Micronesia's archipelago (known as the Caroline Islands) is notable for having had some of Oceania's earliest exposure to Europeans.

After thousands of years in isolation, European contact with Oceanians was established during 1521 in the neighboring Micronesian region of Guam, when a Spanish expedition under Ferdinand Magellan reached its shoreline. The first contact that Spain had with the Carolines was in 1525, when a summer storm carried the navigators Diogo da Rocha and Gomes de Sequeira eastward from the Moluccas (by way of Celebes). They ended up reaching several of the Caroline Islands, staying there until 20 January 1526. In the Carolines, colonization by the Spanish did not formally begin until the early 17th century.

Micronesia was the first part of Oceania that was evangelized, with Catholicism becoming widespread in the Carolines and elsewhere during the first few hundred years of European colonization.

Venereal disease devastated the islands of Pohnpei and Kosrae during the mid-19th century. The disease came about due to the prostituting of Micronesian girls, some as young as nine, to European whalers. The prostitutes were compensated with tobacco rather than money. Charles W. Morgan, an officer on a whaleship in Kosrae, recounted in his journals:

One day when out cutting ironwood poles, we came to a small village, and the sight of the people in it was perfectly terrible. They were simply eaten up alive with the most loathsome of diseases. The state some of them were in was so sickening that I hurried away into the woods, and cursed the white man who had turned loose this horrible thing among these poor helpless people. The sight of those in that village, where they had been put by themselves to be slowly eaten up the disease, haunted me for years.

— Charles W. Morgan (October 1852),

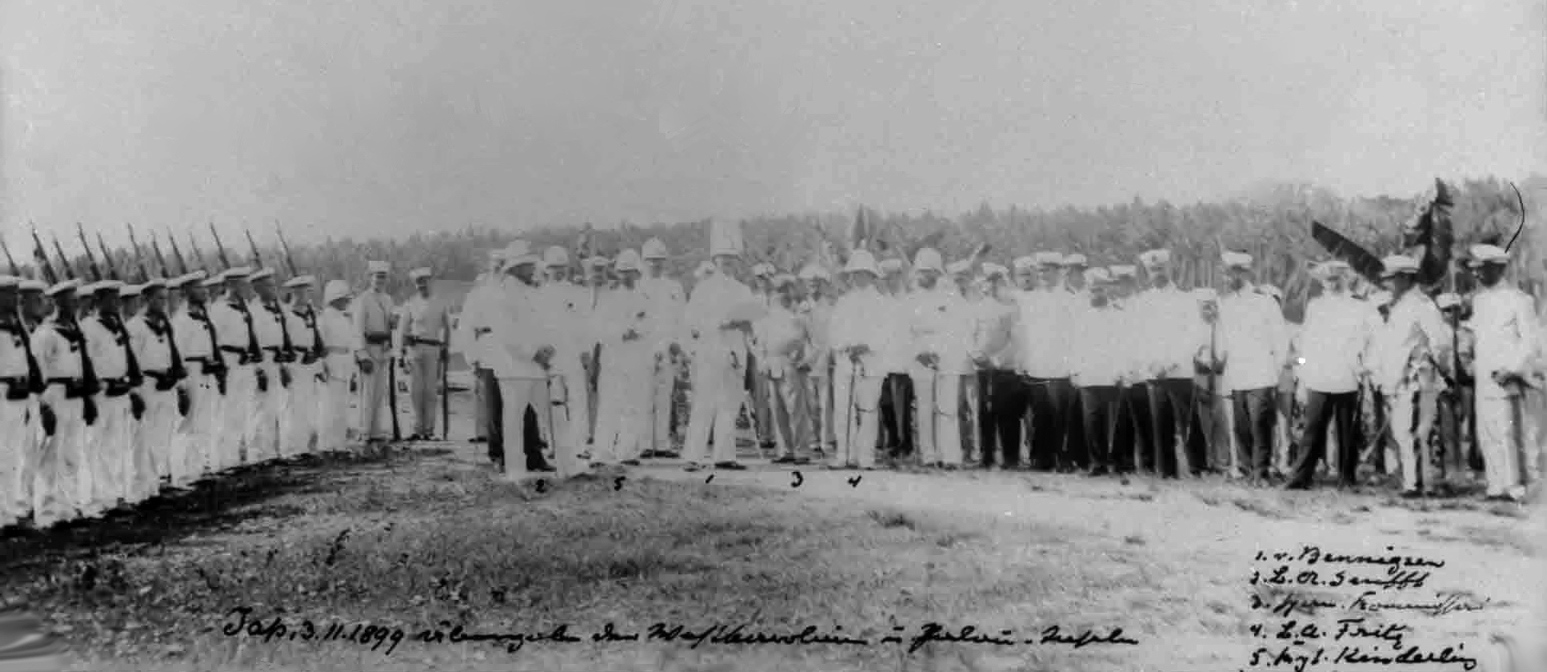
Germans at the transfer of sovereignty for Yap in the Western Caroline Islands, 1899.

Spain sold the Carolines to Germany in 1899 under the terms of the German–Spanish Treaty of that year. Germany placed them under the jurisdiction of German New Guinea. Their acquisition created a need for German-speaking Catholic missionaries. Unlike Protestant denominations, the Catholic Church did not yet have indigenous church leaders, and it would be years before it got them.

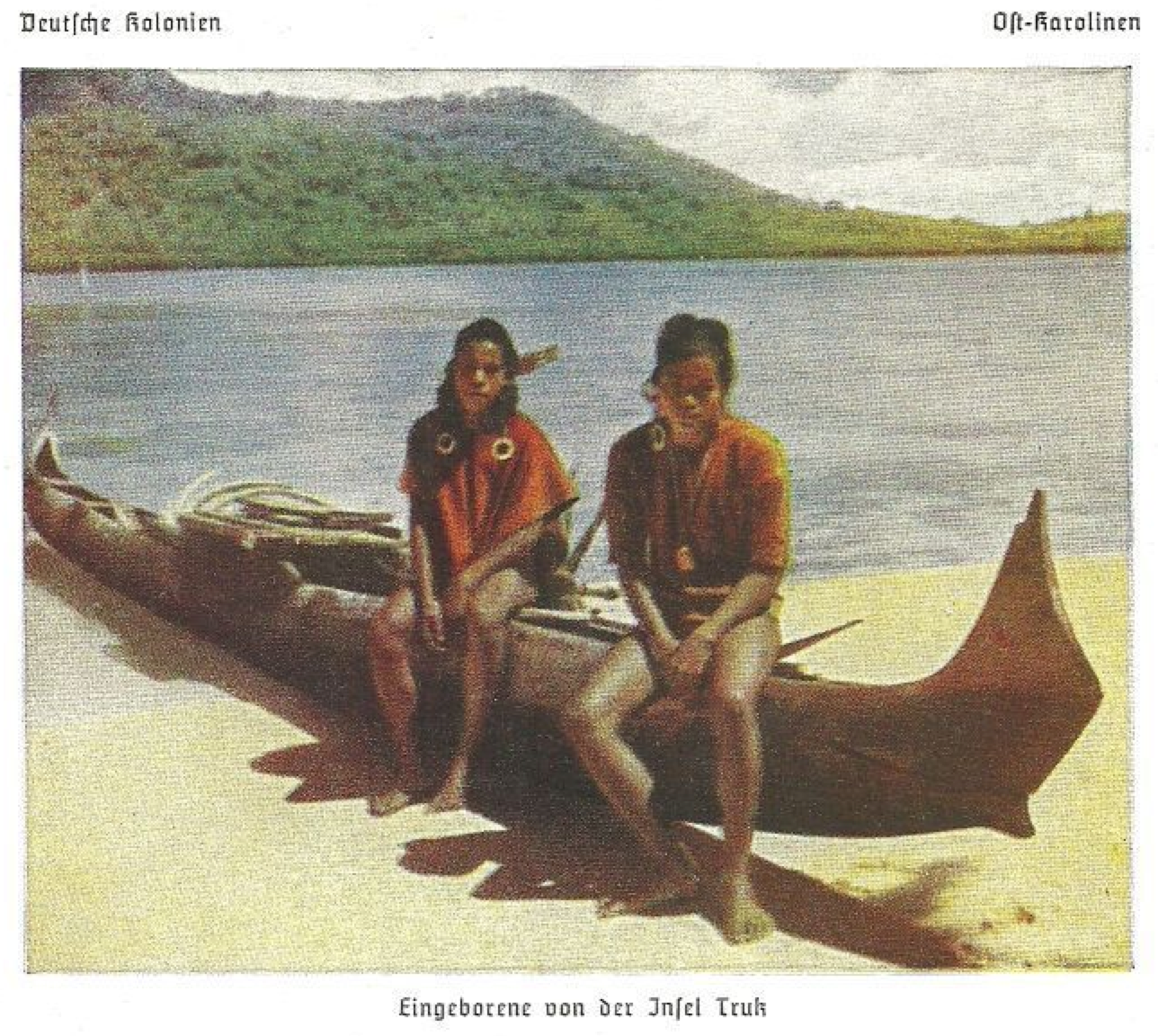
A German postcard of Chuuk. It was created sometime between 1899 and 1914, when Germany had control of the Carolines.

The first two German priests arrived in the Carolines in 1903 to work alongside the remaining Spanish priests. One of the two, Salesius Haas, was assigned to Yap where he taught German to island students. A stream of new German missionaries soon flowed into the Carolines and the Mariana Islands, which had also become a German possession. Seven priests from North Rhine-Westphalia arrived in 1904, and an equal number were sent out in 1905 and 1906. By 1907, German missionaries no longer worked side by side with the Spanish; they had replaced them entirely.

German efforts to reorganize the traditional social hierarchy and recruit forced labor for construction resulted in a rebellion by inhabitants of Sokehs Municipality in 1910. This is known as the Sokehs rebellion, and is considered a key event in Germany's brief history of colonial rule in the Pacific.

Germany lost control of the Carolines to Japan during World War I. Japan's own colonization likewise ended with World War II, following their defeat to the United States. Beginning in 1947, the area became a United Nations Trust Territory, before attaining sovereignty in the 1980s, under the name the Federated States of Micronesia.

FS Micronesia has been heavily reliant on aid from the United States since World War II. They entered a compact free trade agreement in 1986 that gives America full authority and responsibility for the defense of the FSM. The Compact provides U.S. grant funds and federal program assistance to the FSM. In addition to American assistance, FS Micronesia also receives a significant amount of aid from Australia.

==== Marshall Islands ====
The Marshall Islands were initially settled by Micronesians possibly up to 4,000 years ago. Very little is known of the islands' early history.

They were sighted in 1529 by the Spanish navigator Alvaro Saavedra Cerón, and several Spanish ships went on to visit them that century. However, the Marshalls lacked enough natural resources to encourage exploitation by outsiders for many years. The islands are named after British navy officer John Marshall. In 1788 he captained the Scarborough, a ship of the First Fleet taking convicts from England to Botany Bay in Australia. He then sailed from Australia to China, coming across the islands along the way. Marshall partially explored the islands, but much of the mapping was done by subsequent Russian expeditions in the early 19th century. American whalers frequented the islands from the 1820s onward. American and Hawaiian Protestant missionaries also began efforts to convert the islanders in the 1850s. During the 1860s, German Adolph Capelle built the first large-scale trading company in the Marshalls. German trading firms began operations in the Marshalls soon after. Germany established a fueling station on Jaluit Atoll by treaty with island chiefs, and in 1886 established a protectorate over the Marshalls. The Marshalls were originally claimed by Spain in 1874, with Germany purchasing the islands from them to the amount of $4.5 million. Japan seized the Marshalls during World War I, and the United States expelled them in World War II. The war decimated the native population and turned the islands into a virtual battlefield, which contained fighting considered to be some of the most violent in the history of the Pacific. The Marshall Islands were made part of the United Nations Trust Territory of the Pacific Islands under jurisdiction of the United States in 1947.

After their populations were removed to other atolls, Bikini and Enewetak served as an official testing ground for US nuclear bombs. The nuclear testing program lasted between 1946 and 1958.

The Marshall Islands became self-governing in 1979, and they agreed to enter a Compact of Free Association with the United States on 25 June 1983. It granted the Marshall Islands substantial authority in foreign affairs, but vested the United States with full responsibility and authority for their defense. The Marshall Islands gained formal independence in 1986, when the Compact officially went into effect.

==== Nauru ====
Little is known about the pre-European history of the Micronesian island of Nauru. The first inhabitants are believed to have possibly arrived 3,000 or more years ago, with a long period of isolation likely accounting for the island's distinct language.

After Australia was settled in 1788, trade routes from Australasia through the Pacific to the China Seas were forged by frequent use. This led to Nauru's discovery by outsiders on 8 November 1798, when a whaling British ship called the Snow Hunter came across it, en route from New Zealand to the China Seas. Hundreds of Nauruans canoed out to greet the sailors. They urged the sailors to anchor, offering them fruit and coconuts. The captain, John Fearn, did not permit his men to leave the ship, nor did any Nauruans venture aboard. Fearn named Nauru "Pleasant Island", since it had a lush environment, and natives whom he perceived to be friendly.

Fearn noted that the natives carried no weapons, and believed that some ship had been there before him because of their confident and courteous manner. Nauruans are today considered a Micronesian group, although Fearn instead made a link between them and Polynesians. No one on the island had traditional Polynesian tattoos, yet he found the straight black hair and coppery skin colour of the inhabitants to be reminiscent of the Māori from New Zealand. The density of the island's population surprised Fearn; he saw at least 300 people in canoes, many more on the beaches, and a great many large sturdy houses. The Snow Hunter departed the following day.

In the 1830s, Venezuelan Francisco Michelena y Rojas claimed to have visited Nauru. He told of a similarly friendly reception by the Nauruans, who bartered pigs for trade goods. Rojas also claimed that at the time of his visit there were neither white men nor firearms on the island. His visit cannot be authenticated, and remains suspect to some because of the unreliability of his accounts of other islands.

Because of its geographic location, Nauru remained free of permanent European contact for longer than most other Pacific islands. The isolation was broken when whaling ships began to hunt in the area during the early 1830s, which brought about an increased number of outsiders for the next 30 years. It was as a result of this contact that Nauru received the first of its many beachcombers.

Reports of beachcombers were first heard in Sydney in 1837. Five local seamen, who had deserted their whalers to settle on Nauru, found the island little to their liking and stowed away on the Duke of York to return to Sydney and civilization. These five Australians were on Nauru for a few months, and besides them there were eight other Europeans, most of whom had been on the island for some years. Two of these, Patrick Burke and John Jones, were Irish convicts who had escaped from Norfolk Island's penal colony. The Sydney seamen mistakenly believed that Burke and Jones had been on the John Bull, which had mysteriously disappeared near Pohnpei in 1830, and that they had killed and eaten their companions. The Sydney seamen told how Jones had become a virtual dictator of Nauru. Jones ordered the Naurans to strip the clothes and possessions of those landing on the island, so he could have control over these new arrivals. Two beachcombers who had displeased Jones had been set adrift in a canoe, and the Sydney seamen told how the Nauruans kept another European prisoner in the interior of the island on Jones's orders. Jones also planned to capture vessels that put in at the island. Jones's reign came to an end in October 1841, when he poisoned seven and shot four of his fellow beachcombers, fearing that they would usurp his influence over the Nauruans. He tried to blame the Nauruans for these murders, but they ostracised him and he was forced to leave secretly for Banaba in Kiribati. Some months later he attempted to return, but the Nauruans threatened him and he left the island for good. The story of this massacre was told by a beachcomber to Commander T. Beckford Simpson, of the Giraffe, which touched on Nauru on a voyage from Sydney to Manila on 1 February 1843.

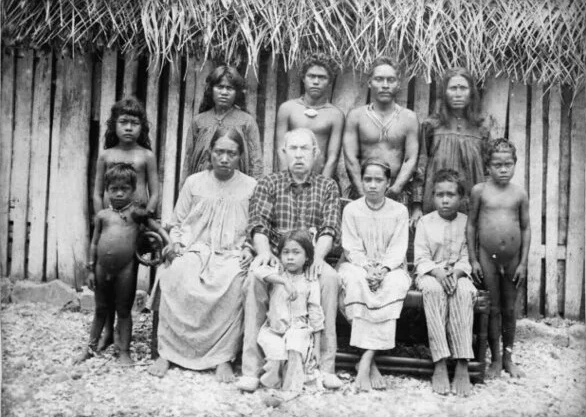
William Harris with his Nauran wife and children, 1887.

At the time of Simpson's visit there were seven Europeans on the island, all deserters from their ships, who quarreled frequently among themselves. One frequent cause of such quarrels was disputes over Nauruan women. This violent lust over native women was aggravated by the intoxication of the beachcombers, who were able to distill sour toddy to make their own alcoholic liquor. Simpson was most concerned with the effects the beachcombers had on the Nauruans, believing that their atrocious behavior was setting a bad example.

One of the seven beachcombers in 1843 was a British convict from Norfolk Island named William Harris; he had escaped Norfolk's penal colony and made his way to Nauru the previous year. Harris took a Nauruan wife and produced a large mixed race family. The natives adopted Harris as a Nauruan, and he ended up having a much more positive influence among them as time went on. His family continued to be important on the island after his death. Harris's exact cause of death is unclear, all that is known is that he turned to trading at some point, and was lost at sea in 1889 when his canoe was borne westward by strong currents.

Beachcombers often left guns on the island, which culminated in a decade-long war between the twelve native clans, and the almost halving of the population from approximately 1,400 (1843) to 900 (1888). William Harris was the first to inform outsiders of the war in 1881.

Germany incorporated Nauru into its Marshall Islands protectorate in late 1888. This move was encouraged by a few German traders concerned about their own interests on the island. The German administration and the arrival of Christian missionaries shortly thereafter brought an end to armed hostilities.

Rev. Philip Delaporte, a German born-American Protestant missionary, arrived in Nauru with his family in November 1899. They came via Hawaii, having been sent by the Central Union Church of Honolulu and the American Board of Commissioners for Foreign Missions. Their mission was started some ten years earlier by a Kiribatian pastor, and it maintained a school. Along with another Catholic mission's school, it comprised the only formal educational system on the island for more than two decades.

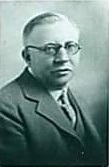
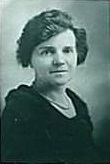
Philip and Salome Delaporte, c. 1906.

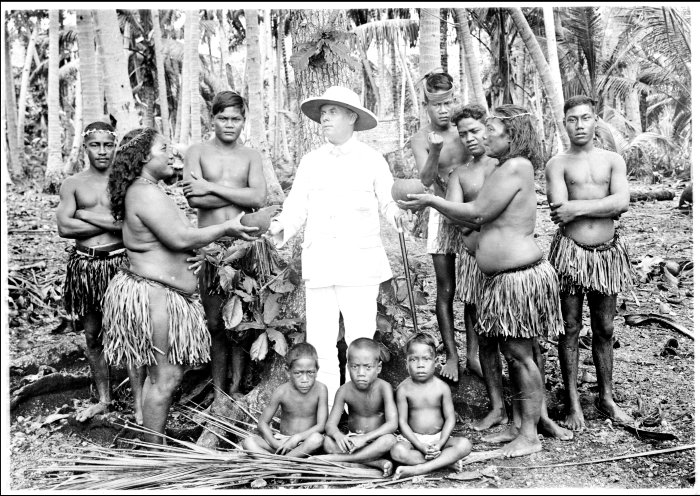
A Missionary in Nauru being presented with the cup of love and welcome, c.1916-1917.

Delaporte translated numerous religious texts into the Nauruan language, including the New Testament, stories from the Old Testament, a catechism, a hymn book, school text, and history of the Christian church. In 1907, he also published a German-Nauruan dictionary (Taschenworterbuch Deutsch-Nauru). Him and his wife Salome encouraged the Nauruans to dress in a more European-style, including Mother Hubbard dresses, singlets (sleeveless shirt or vest), and Lavalavas (simple skirt). Polygyny was no longer allowed under their watch, and traditional Nauruan dances were discouraged. The Delaporte's eldest daughter was born in the United States; however, they went on to have a further four children while in Nauru; Paul, Mabel, Philip, and Margaret. They were thought to be among the first purely white children born there.

Rich phosphate deposits were discovered in the late 1890s. The Pacific Phosphate Company, a British concern, negotiated an agreement with the German administration in 1906 to start mining. Nauru was so little known in Germany that one Berlin official thought it was part of the Solomon Islands when he came for a mining expedition that year.

Delaporte was able to take advantage of the Pacific Phosphate Company's informal connections with the London Missionary Society (LMS) to benefit the mission. For example, the LMS assisted in acquiring printing machinery in Sydney, Australia, and the machinery was shipped to Nauru in cooperation with the mining company. Their mission on Nauru was taken over by the London Missionary Society in early 1917, and the Delaportes returned to the United States. Delaporte's wife Salome reflected on the accomplishments of Christianity in Micronesia by writing:

From being slaves to being freed-women, from immorality to decency in moral living, from superstition to a degree of enlightenment and civilization, from semi-nudity to at least a partial conception of the necessity for clothes; such are some of the things Christianity has accomplished for and among the women and girls of the island of Nauru, Marshall Islands, in the far South Pacific.

— Mrs. Salome Delaporte (1920),

Nauru remained a German colony until Australian forces expelled them in 1914 during World War I. Their legacy is still evident in Nauru, with many on the island having German first names.

In 1919, Nauru became a mandated territory of the League of Nations with Australia as the main administering power, and Britain and New Zealand as co-trustees. This gave the three countries control over the lucrative phosphate industry. World War II brought another occupier when Japanese forces arrived in August 1942. The following year, 1,200 Nauruans were taken to Japan's Chuuk colony (now part of the present-day Federated States of Micronesia) to serve as forced labourers. The Nauruan labourers suffered severe hardships at the hands of the Japanese. In September 1945, Australian troops again took possession of Nauru and on 31 January 1946, 737 Nauruans were returned home from Chuuk. In November 1947, Nauru became a United Nations trust territory, in an arrangement paralleling the former League of Nations mandate. Australia, Britain and New Zealand were again the responsible authorities, but Australia continued to provide the actual administration.

Hammer DeRoburt, an Australian-educated Nauruan of chiefly status, emerged as a political leader in the 1950s and advocated autonomy for his people. Mining operations caused such environmental devastation that Australia proposed the resettlement of Nauruans on an island off Australia's northern coast. DeRoburt rejected Australia's proposals and after hard bargaining he obtained their agreement to full independence, which was formally achieved in 1968. DeRoburt became the first president of the new republic.

Nauru's self-led independence from the much larger Australia was considered a remarkable political feat. The 1970 book Nauru: Phosphate and Political Progress, by Australian author Nancy Viviani, states: "For however deep we go back into the annals of history it is impossible to discover a parallel case in which a community of near comparable size has gained its independence in the teeth of opposition from a metropolitan country numbering over 10 millions. Andorra, San Marino, and Liechtenstein spring immediately to mind; but after all they did not gain their independence, they merely maintained it in the face of neighbouring national consolidation."

Their independence granted them full control of the phosphate reserves, which made Nauru the second richest country in the world by the early 1980s. Their meteoric rise was profiled by The New York Times in 1982.

Nauru's phosphate was shipped into the port of Geelong in Victoria, Australia, leading to the Nauruans forging strong connections with that state's capital city, Melbourne. In 1977, they built the Nauru House on Little Collins Street. The high rise tower helped generate revenue for Nauru through renters. It briefly became Melbourne's tallest building, however, it was never tall enough to take the mantle as Australia's tallest building, with the taller MLC Centre in Sydney completed just a few months earlier.

By the late 1990s, Nauru's phosphate industry had severely declined, leaving the country in financial ruin.

The Australian government launched the Pacific Solution in 2001, which was intended to deter asylum seekers from making boat trips to Australia by denying them access to their processing facilities. The government faced a difficult task in finding Oceanian states who were willing to co-operate with them on the Pacific Solution. Unsuccessful approaches were made to Fiji, French Polynesia, Palau, Tonga and Tuvalu. The Pacific Solution avoided immediate collapse on 10 September 2001, when Nauru signed a Statement of Principles and First Administrative Agreement with Australia. It meant they agreed to host not only 283 intercepted Hazara Afghan asylum seekers, but also 237 other asylum seekers intercepted by the Royal Australian Navy, and to consider Australian requests to host further groups of asylum seekers. The Nauruans were financially rewarded by Australia for agreeing to hold the asylum seekers. Nauru's detention center program has had several cessations and re-establishments since late 2001, and was still active for most of the 2010s. A reason for its continued presence is due to Nauru's concern over losing much-needed aid from Australia.

==== Palau ====
The first European contact with the western Micronesian islands of Palau is unclear. There is disagreement as to whether Spaniard Ruy López de Villalobos, who landed in several Caroline Islands, spotted Palau in 1543, or if Ferdinand Magellan sighted it even earlier in 1522. No conclusive evidence exists. The earliest confirmed European contact with Palauans came a century later in December 1696, when a group of islanders shipwrecked on the Filipino island of Samar. They were interviewed by the Czech missionary Paul Klein on 28 December 1696. Klein was able to draw the first map of Palau based on a description given by the shipwrecked Palauans, and in June 1697 he sent a letter informing Europeans of Palau's existence. This map and the letter caused a vast interest in the islands, and resulted in failed attempts by Catholic missionaries to travel to Palau from the Philippines in 1700, 1708 and 1709.

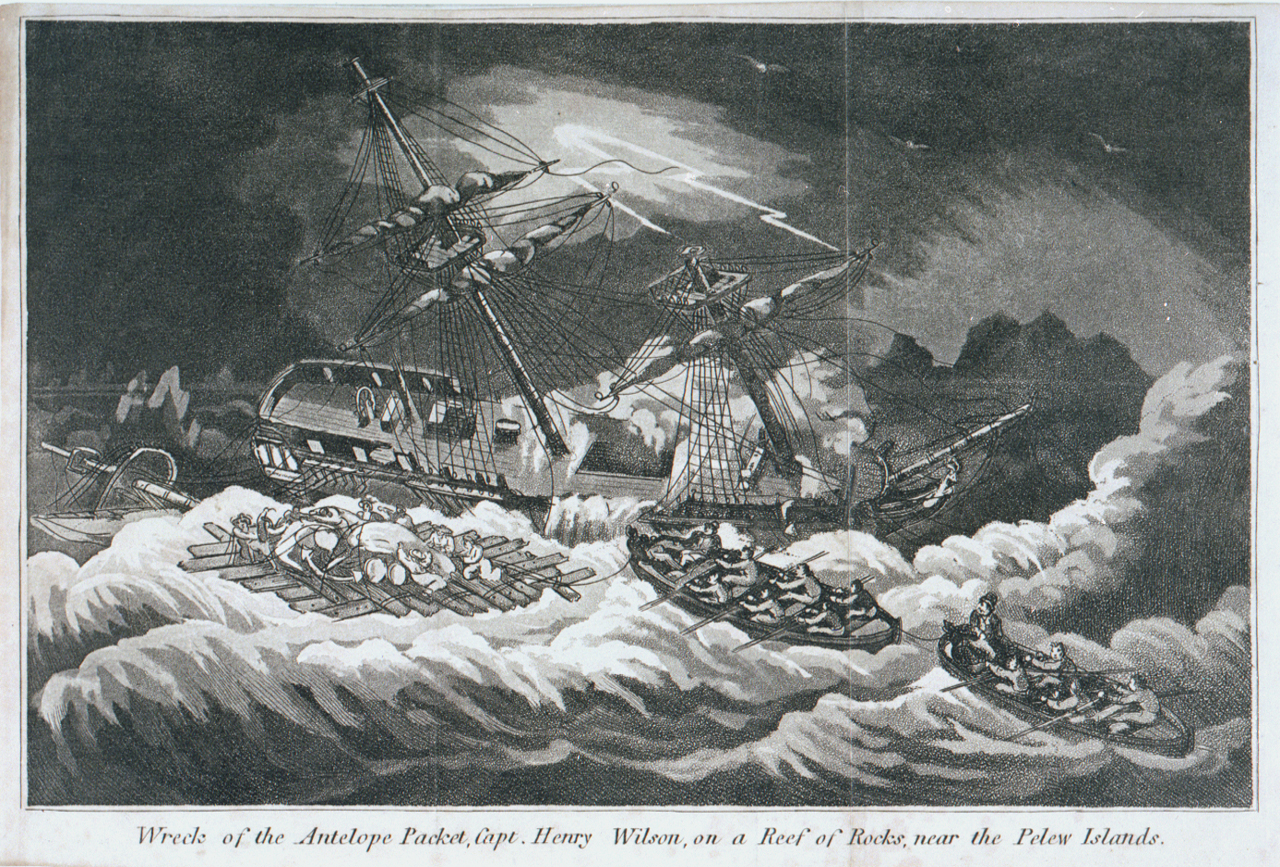
Wreck of the Antelope Packet, Capt. Henry Wilson, on a Reef of Rocks, near the Pelew Islands by Thomas Tegg, National Maritime Museum.

Sustained contact with outsiders took place after the East India Company’s Antelope shipwrecked near Palau in 1783. The Anteleope's crew consisted of Englishmen, in addition to sixteen Chinese. The stranded crew reached shore and are believed to have been well treated by the natives. From the wreck they built a small boat, which managed to take them to the Asian island of Macao. They took with them Palau's Prince Lee Boo, who also travelled with the group to London, becoming one of the first native Oceanians to visit Britain. Lee Boo died of smallpox on 27 December 1784, some six months after his arrival in London.

In 1788, British author George Keate wrote An Account of the Pelew Islands, which was based on the events of the Antelope shipwreck. The book's theme of mutually beneficial interaction between Europeans and Pacific Islanders was in stark contrast to the suspicion and violence that marred early encounters between the two groups in other parts of Oceania. Keate didn't travel to Palau, and he composed the accounts from the journals of Captain Henry Wilson, and the reports of the officers and crew of the Antelope. The book never names the sixteen Chinese crew members, and some have questioned its accuracy, in light of archeological findings which hint at more cautions cross-cultural relations.

In the 19th century, Palau had occasional visits from European whalers and traders, who left firearms behind. Diseases through contact with these Europeans led to the deaths of many islanders, and the leftover firearms were prized for intervillage warfare. British Captain Cyprian Bridge of HMS Espiegle helped bring an end to intervillage warfare, through a peaceful intervention in 1883. The Spanish gained administrative control of Palau in 1885. When Spanish Catholic missionaries had become well-established on neighboring Yap in 1890, it was decided that the time had arrived for them to make serious preparations to extend their work to Palau. Yap Catholic missionaries Daniel Arbacegui and Antolin Orihuela sailed to Palau in July of that year. Arbacegui spent several days trying to convince the island chiefs of the missionaries' peaceful intentions. Eventually suspicions were broken down, and the Palauans loaded the missionaries with gifts before they returned to Yap.

On 28 April 1891, Spanish Catholic missionaries again arrived in Palau, and they founded the first permanent mission. The island chiefs greeted the four missionaries with great enthusiasm, and immediately turned over to them an old meeting house that they could use as their headquarters. The meeting house, situated near the water, was crumbling and infested with vermin, but the missionaries managed to wall off a portion for a chapel, using the rest of the building as their temporary residence. The four missionaries, Antonio de Valencia, Luis de Granada, Joaquin de Masamagrell and Oton de Ochovi, entertained the handful of Palauans who were bold enough to visit them early on. From the start, they waged a battle against Palauan custom. They saw their missionary work as a struggle to replace the traditional customs with "new and better ones." Prostitution, divorce and sorcery were among the main targets of the missionary campaign.

More Spanish missionaries eventually arrived, and they persisted with their work in Palau, even after Spain had begun selling off their Micronesian islands to Germany in 1899. The rigors of mission life took their toll on the first four missionaries; de Ochovi died in Palau in 1898, while de Granada succumbed to various illnesses in 1903. The remaining missionaries had to continue their work without Spanish government support. Attendance fell off in their schools, since the Spanish language was no longer important to Palauans, who were now under German influence. When the last of the Spanish priests finally left in 1906, 140 of Palau's 4,000 residents were Catholic.

The Japanese navy expelled the Germans from Palau at the beginning of World War I, while Japan lost control of Palau in World War II. After a short period of administration by the United States Navy, Palau became part of the United Nations Trust Territory of the Pacific Islands under US administration in 1947. It became internally self-governing in 1981, and attained independence as a sovereign state in 1994. Palau have had a Compact of Free Association with the United States since 1986, and they continue to receive millions in aid from both the US and Australia. As of 2020, around 233 or 1.2% of the population are of European origin.

=== Polynesia ===
==== Cook Islands ====
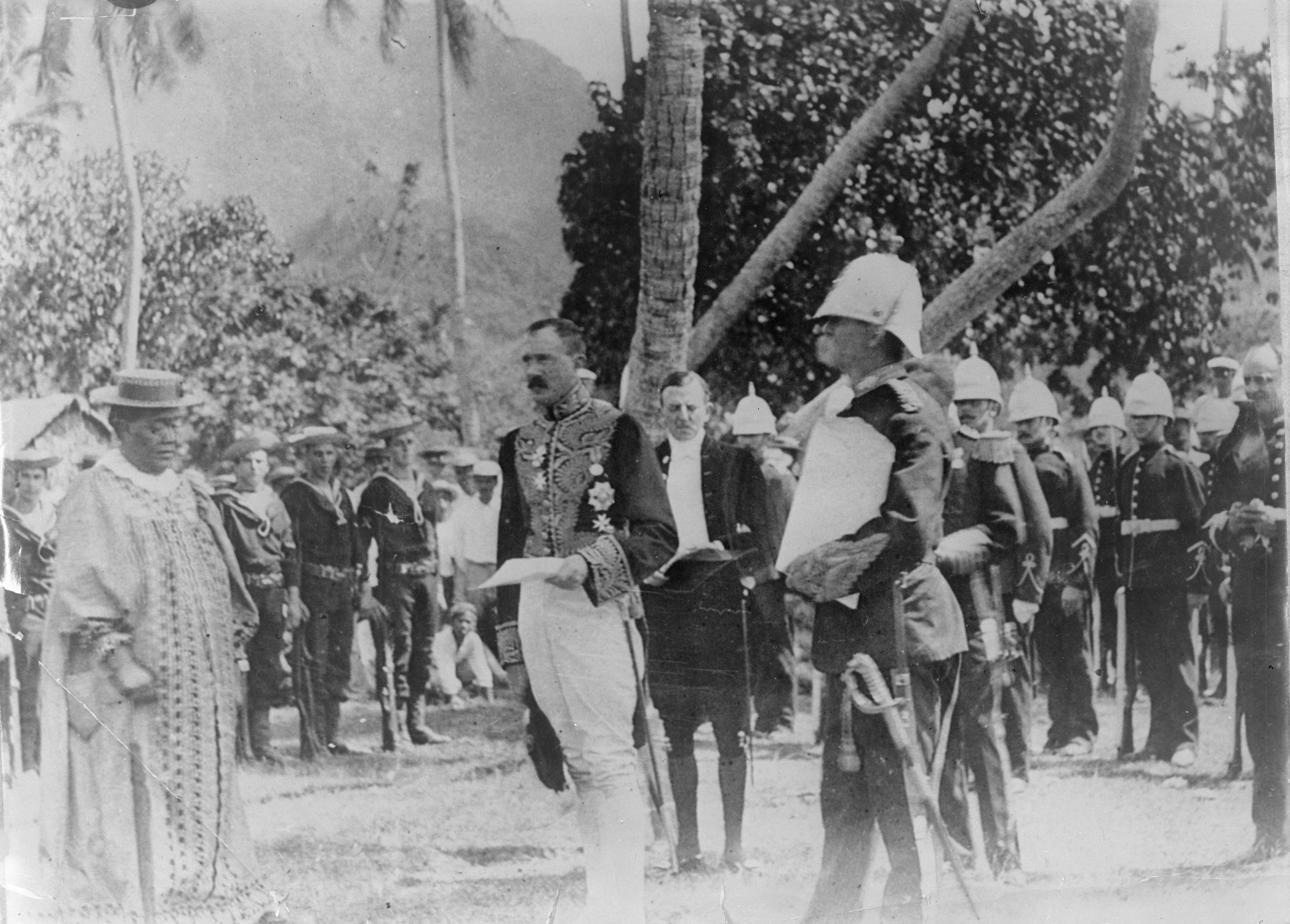
British colonial officer reads the Cook Islands annexation proclamation to Queen Makea on 7 October 1900

==== Easter Island ====
Easter Island was inhabited by Polynesians known as the Rapa Nui prior to European discovery. Archeological evidence suggests they arrived around 400 AD. The island is internationally recognized for its Moai statues, constructed by the Rapa Nui. It is also considered one of the most isolated places on earth with human inhabitation.

The first European to land on Easter Island was the Dutch admiral Jacob Roggeveen, who discovered it on Easter Day, 1722. Roggeveen and his crew described the natives as worshiping huge standing statues with fires while they prostrated themselves to the rising sun.

Don Felipe Gonzales, a Spanish captain, was the next to land at Easter Island in 1770. Gonzales and his men spent four days ashore. In that time they learned that the natives had their own local form of script. He attempted to claim the island for the King of Spain, and was able to convince the natives to ink a Spanish deed of cession. Gonzales estimated a population of some 3,000 persons.

A civil war likely occurred between 1770 and the arrival of British navigator Captain James Cook in 1774. Cook found a devastated population of only 600 to 700 men, with fewer than 30 women being found. Cook also observed that the large statues had been overthrown. In 1786, the French navigator Jean-François de Galaup, comte de Lapérouse made an unsuccessful effort to introduce domestic animals. European sailing vessels and whalers occasionally visited the island from 1792 onward, and by 1860 the population had returned to 3,000.

Peruvians of European or Mixed European descent introduced slavery to the island in 1862. Easter Island was one of many Polynesian islands targeted by Peru, and was the hardest hit due to its geographical proximity to the South American coast. More than 1,400 Rapa Nui were kidnapped; some ended up being sold in Peru as domestic servants, while others became manual laborers on plantations. The slavery, labelled as an "immigration scheme", caused outrage in the country. Many Peruvians believed it was damaging the reputation of their nation in the eyes of the rest of the world, and the government eventually announced that they would "prohibit the introduction of Polynesian settlers."

470 captured Rapa Nui were sent back to Easter Island, on a ship that was only large enough to support 160 passengers. The ship was infested with disease carrying rodents, and when they reached the island, only fifteen passengers were still alive. The surviving passengers had contracted smallpox during the journey, and spread it to the rest of the island, causing a deadly epidemic.

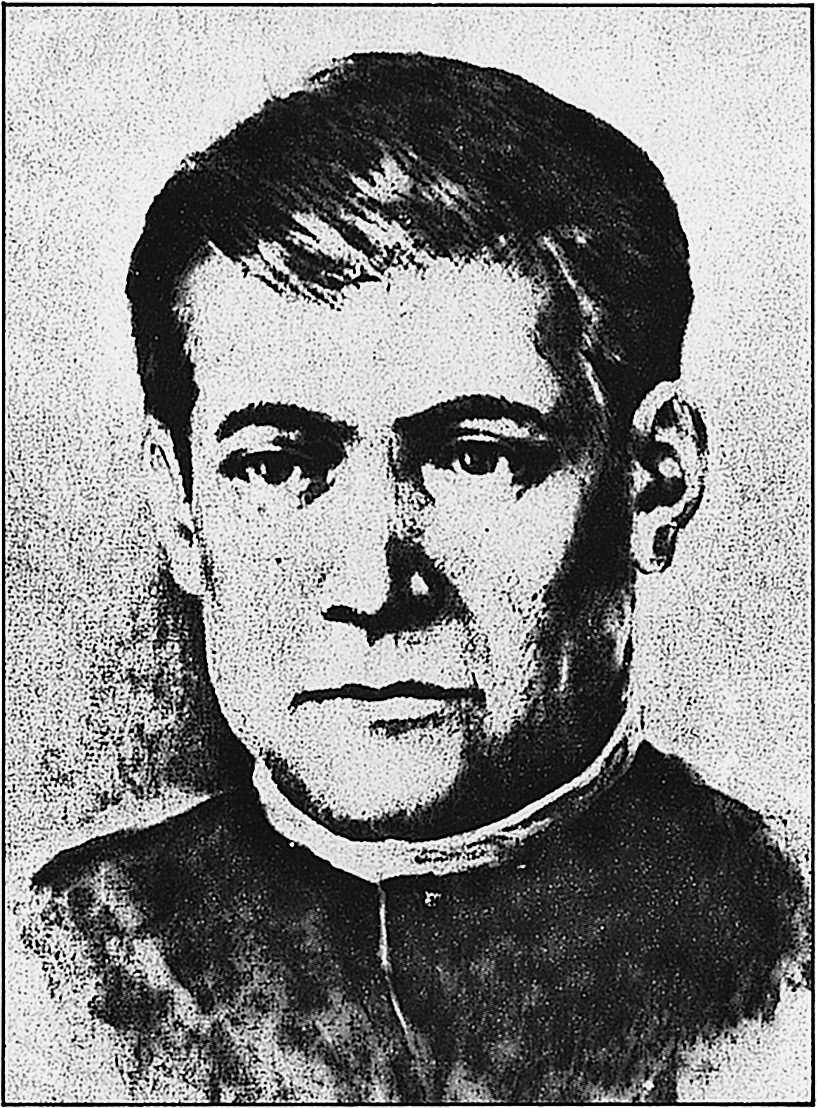
French Catholic missionary Eugène Eyraud.

In 1863, French Catholic priest Eugène Eyraud heard about the recent events on the island, and decided to travel there as a missionary. Using his own funds, Eyraud sailed from Tahiti to Easter Island, where he arrived on 2 January 1864. Eyraud made extensive preparations to prepare for his voyage. He took bolts of cloth with which to cover the natives, carpenter's tools, various pieces of timber and wood with which to build a cabin, a barrel of flour, two or three catechisms and prayer books in Tahitian and a bell with which to call the natives to prayer. Additionally, he also took five sheep and some cuttings of trees that he hoped might adapt to the climate on Easter Island. Eyraud ended up spending most of the year there.

In 1866, he established a Catholic mission on the island, with his missionaries influencing the natives to abandon their old practices. Eyraud had converted the entire population to Catholicism by 1868. Tuberculosis came to the island in 1867, which led to the death of a quarter of the island's population, and Eyraud died of it on 23 August 1868, nine days after the last islanders had been baptized.

The native population, estimated to have once been 10,000 before European discovery, had been reduced to 111 towards the end of the 19th century. No countries showed any interest in colonizing Easter Island up to that point, because of its remoteness. Britain recommended Chile to claim it in order to keep France from doing so first. In 1888, Rapa Nui king Atamu Tekena signed a deed by Chilean naval captain Policarpo Toro, giving Chile full sovereignty over the island. The treaty also consisted of a symbolic act; Atamu Tekena took grass in one hand and dirt in the other. He gave Policarpo Toro the grass and kept the dirt for himself, meaning that the Rapa Nui would always be true owners of the land. Chileans have since come to be known among Rapa Nui as "mauku" (meaning "grass" in their language).

In the mid-20th century, Norwegian scientist Thor Heyerdahl proposed a theory that the natives were of Indigenous American descent, due to the similarity between Rapa Nui and Inca stonework. Heyerdahl maintained the idea that native South Americans were capable to sail through the Pacific Ocean on route to Easter Island. To test his theory, in 1947 he left the coast of Peru on a rudimentary wooden boat, the Kon Tiki. Following the currents, he managed to arrive at French Polynesia. Heyerdahl held this as evidence that one could reach Easter Island setting sail from the Americas, even though French Polynesia is approximately 3,000 kilometers North of Easter Island. His theory has since been disproven by DNA testing, which shows that the Rapa Nui have Polynesian genes, not Indigenous American genes.

Today, the people living on Easter Island are largely descendants of the ancient Rapa Nui (approximately 60%), and they run the bulk of the tourism and conservation efforts on the island. The rest of the population are primarily Chileans of European and Mestizo origin, with some Rapa Nui on the island having European blood as a result of race mixing; the majority of white Chilean residents and those of part-European blood are descendants of Spanish, with some German, British, and Italian settlers. Despite the current European presence, the island's Polynesian identity is still strong.

==== Hawaii ====
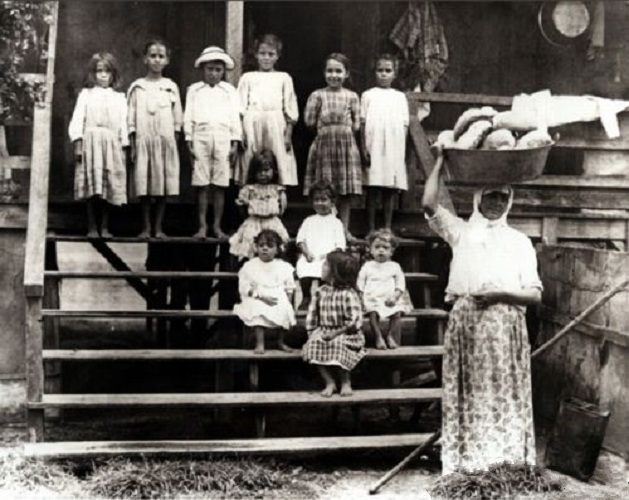
Portuguese immigrant family in Hawaii during the 19th century

The Hawaiian Islands were uninhabited for millions of years, until Polynesians from Marquesas Islands began settling on them around 300-600 A.D

Captain James Cook became the first European to set foot on Hawaiian soil in 1778. Cook returned a year later and was killed in a confrontation with Hawaiians at Kealakekua Bay. In 1820, the first Christian missionaries arrived, and shortly afterward European traders and whalers came to the islands. They brought with them diseases that devastated the Native Hawaiian population. Hawaiians numbered about 300,000 when Cook arrived; in 1853, the native population was down to 70,000.

By the 1890s, American colonists controlled Hawaii's sugar-based economy, and they overthrew the kingdom to establish the Republic of Hawaii. The US officially annexed Hawaii as a territory in 1898. Hawaiians began using the term Haole to refer to foreigners, and it soon became synonymous with wealthy whites. White skin-color alone did not confer Haole status on new arrivals from Portugal, Spain, or even Germany and Norway. These people were merely immigrants brought to Hawaii as ordinary plantation workers, and only became "Haole" once they had emerged from the unskilled labor category and moved into middle or upper class positions.

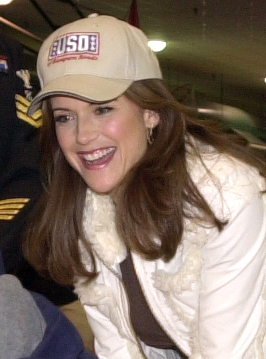
Kelly Preston in 2005.

In 1959, the US government organized a vote in Hawaii to determine if the territory should become a state. The vote passed, and Hawaii became their 50th state. The legitimacy of this vote is disputed, the ballot contained only two options: for Hawaii to stay a US territory or for Hawaii to become a US state. Migrants of European origin have remained highly prevalent since 1959, with whites today currently making up nearly 30% of Hawaii's 1.4 million population. By contrast, native Hawaiians made up 97% of the population in 1853.

Hawaiian culture, and by extension Polynesian culture, began to penetrate the European-dominated mainland of the United States during the 1960s. This was partly due to the rise of Tiki, as well as Hollywood films. That decade, it became common for white Californian parents to send their children to Hawaii for the summer. In the middle part of the 1980s, Honolulu was rocked by the grisly murders of five women (mainly of European origin). Such types of crime were unheard of in Hawaii at the time. The serial killer remains unknown, and he has been nicknamed the Honolulu Strangler. Evidence strongly suggests it was the now deceased Howard Gay, a white mainland American.

Several white figures well known in the mainland US and abroad have been born in Hawaii. They range from those who left at an early age (Lauren Graham, Timothy Olyphant), to those who lived considerable portions of their lives on the islands. Actress Kelly Preston was born in Honolulu in 1962, spending her youth not only in Hawaii, but also in another Oceanian region, Australia. She graduated from Honolulu's Punahou School in 1980, forging a successful film career in Los Angeles not long afterwards. Preston, who has English, Irish, German and Scottish ancestry, claimed in a 2002 interview that she was additionally "about 1/32 Hawaiian".

==== Niue ====
Niue was originally inhabited by voyagers from eastern Polynesia. Captain James Cook became the first European to discover it, making three failed attempts to land in 1774. At first, he and his men made no contact with the natives. Further along the coast, he saw Niueans from a distance, and at a third stop he came ashore and the two groups met. Fighting ensued, with shooting and spear throwing coming from both. Cook was eventually chased away, and named it the "Savage Island" when he departed. It has been claimed that the natives were merely performing a traditional challenge, even though Cook interpreted it as a hostile reception.

The first European missionaries to arrive on the island were a group from the London Missionary Society on the Messenger of Peace in 1830. As part of the expedition, The Rev. John Williams took two Niue boys with him to Tahiti, and subsequently sent them back to the island as teachers. But once they returned, influenza had broken out among the natives, and the two youths were accused of bringing it from Tahiti. Following the influenza outbreak, Niue became fearful of outsiders spreading further diseases.

The British missionaries ultimately failed to convert the Niueans to Christianity. Niueans didn't convert to Christianity until 1846 when one of their own people, Nukai Peniamina, returned to the island after getting evangelized in Samoa. Christianity helped bring an end to internal wars between islanders.

By the time well-known congregationalist and missionary George Lewis arrived in 1861, almost all of the population of Niue welcomed him as devout Christians. Only eight on the island at that point were still non-Christians. 40 Niueans would be kidnapped the following year, as part of Peru's Polynesian slave raids.

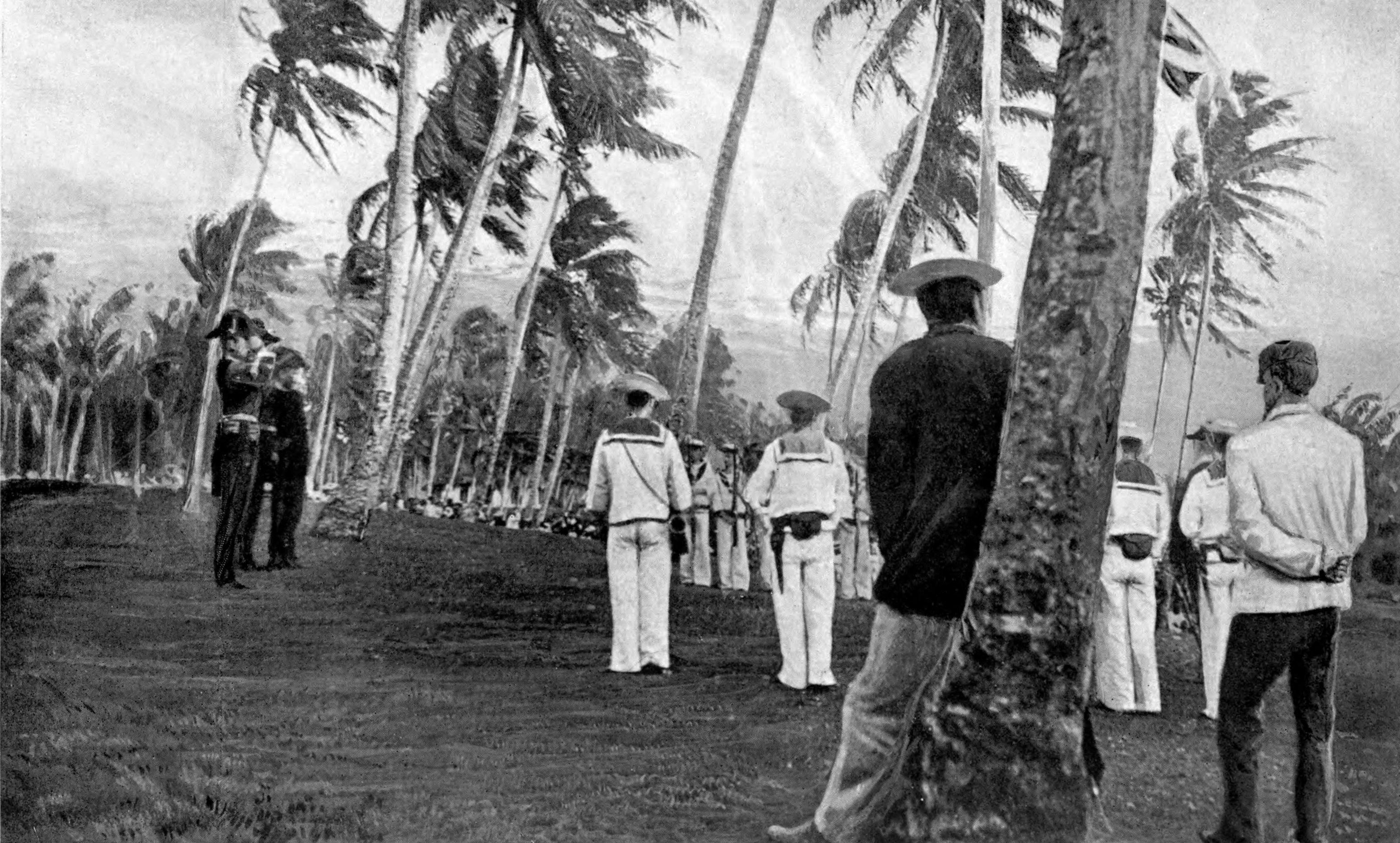
Hoisting the Union Jack flag over Niue, 1900.

Niue became a British colony in 1900, and was brought within the boundaries of New Zealand in 1901, along with the Cook Islands. Niueans and several other native Oceanian ethnicities served alongside European New Zealanders during World War I. After suffering losses in their Māori Contingent during the 1915 Gallipoli campaign with Australia, New Zealand MP Māui Pōmare led a recruiting mission in Niue and the Cook Islands' Rarotonga. 148 Niuean men, 4% of the island's population, were soldiers in the New Zealand armed forces from that point on. World War II, however, would have no impact on the island.

Niue started seeking self-governance after World War II, but, financial aid and family remittances helped delay this until 1974, when Niue officially became a self-governing state in free association with New Zealand. Currently, it is estimated that around 194 of the population have European ancestry. This accounts for 12% of Niue's overall population. Among them, Terry Coe was the only palagi (person of European descent) in the Niue Assembly during his years as a parliamentarian (1993-2023); he was also the country's Finance Minister from 1993 to 1997.

==== Pitcairn Islands ====
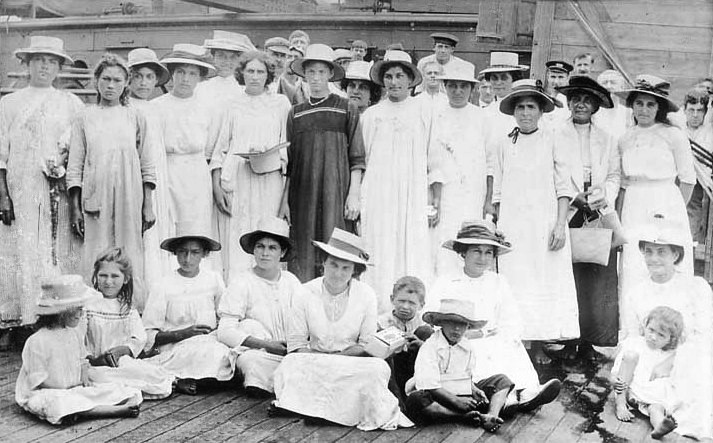
Pitcairn Islanders in 1916.

The highly remote islands were discovered in 1767 by the British, and remained uninhabited until 1790, when they were settled by mutineers from HMS Bounty. The settlers were led by the British-born Fletcher Christian. He sailed to the islands with eight of his own men, six Tahitian men and 12 Tahitian women, whom he had met in present-day French Polynesia. Pitcairn was annexed by Britain in 1838, and by 1856 inhabitants were moved to Norfolk Island because of overpopulation. Some returned to Pitcairn, and it is their descendants who make up the population of 47. As a result of the original ethnic makeup of the island, the current inhabitants are racially mixed Anglo-Tahitians (or Euronesians). Pitcairn is labelled as a "cultural melting pot", and has strong influences from both Britain and Tahiti. In 2004, seven citizens of Pitcairn, including three descendants of Fletcher Christian, were brought to trial on the island on 55 counts of sexual abuse with girls.

In 2021, it was reported that all 47 residents had received COVID-19 vaccinations.

==== Samoa ====
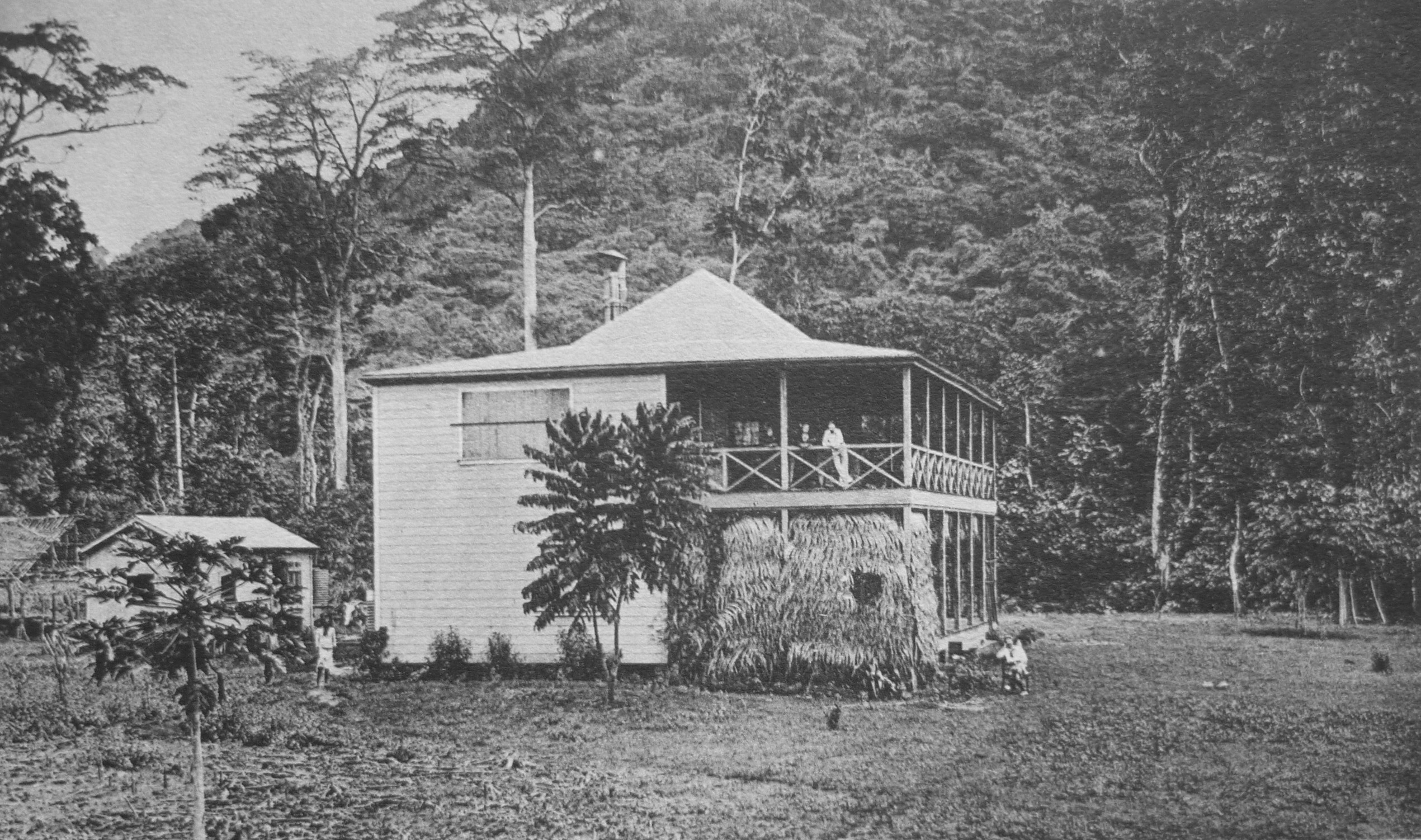
Robert Louis Stevenson's home at Vailima, Samoa, showing him on the veranda, c. 1893

==== Tokelau ====
Tokelau was originally inhabited by Polynesians, who likely arrived from Samoa a thousand years ago. There were several early European discoveries of Tokelau's islands, none of which were considered significant. These included British commodore John Bryon's original discovery of Tokelau in June 1765. He found an uninhabited island with coconut trees, which he named "Duke of York's Island". This has since been identified as the Atafu group of atolls in Tokelau. Captain Edward Edwards later learned about Atafu's existence through Byron. He went there in mid-1791, while in search of the mutineers from HMS Bounty. Edwards also found no natives, nor did he find any of the mutineers, who were now living in Pitcairn (approximately 5,000 kilometers east of Tokelau). The only signs of human life were canoes, suggesting that Atafu was being used as a temporary residence by inhabitants of neighboring islands. When Edwards sailed farther south, he sighted Nukunonu, naming it "Duke of Clarence's Island". In 1835, Fakaofo was sighted by American sailor Captain Smith, of the whaling ship General Jackson. He chose to call it "D'Wolf's Island".

Outsider contact with inhabitants of Tokelau was officially established on 25 January 1841, when the United States Exploring Expedition visited Atafu, discovering a small population. The people are thought to have been only temporarily residents, as there was no chief among them. They appeared to have interacted with foreigners in the past, because they expressed a desire to trade items with the European Americans, and possessed items that were apparently of foreign origin. The American expedition reached Nukunonu on 28 January 1841, but did not record any information about inhabitants. On 29 January 1841, the expedition found an inhabited Fakaofo and named it "Bowditch". The Fakaofo islanders were found to be similar in appearance and behavior to the Atafu islanders.

French Catholic and British Protestant missionaries both began arriving to Tokelau in 1845. in February 1852, 500 people were forcibly removed from Fakaofo and shipped to Uvea in Wallis and Futuna, at the instigation of the Bishop for Central Oceania. By the beginning of the 1860s, Nuknonu was entirely Catholic, and Atafu entirely Protestant, with Fakaofo being a mix between the two. Fakaofo was ravaged by dysentery in January 1863. It originated from a group of natives who tried to sail between Tokelauan islands on Christmas Day 1862, only to end up landing in Samoa. The islanders were returned home via the London Missionary Society's ship John Williams, which is where they contracted the disease.

Peruvians of European or Mixed European descent targeted Tokelau's islands as part of their Polynesian slave raids of the 1860s. The Peruvians, masquerading as missionaries, arrived in February 1863, and managed to kidnap nearly all of Tokelau's men. In Fakaofo, they were planning on only targeting men, however, they changed their minds, and ended up also taking 76 women and children. Many were already ill with dysentery, and it spread among other kidnapped Polynesians on their ship, including those from Easter Island and Niue. Their ship later landed on the shores of New Zealand's Raoul Island, to dump the bodies of over 100 kidnapped men, women and children who had died from the disease. The natives of Nukunonu were visited by five vessels recruiting for Peru. The Peruvians rigorously inspected them, casting aside those who they perceived to not be fit enough for labor. The first arrival took 60 people; the second 6; and the third 10. The remaining inhabitants of Nukunonu feared further visits from the Peruvians, and by April had sailed to Samoa, where they were looked after by Catholic missionaries.

On Atafu, natives were shown samples of cloth, shirts and trousers to entice them to come on board, and were invited to bring their coconuts and fowls to the ship to barter. The Peruvians were assisted by Eli Hutchinson Jennings, a European American who had settled in American Samoa during 1856. He exploited the existing coconut plantations of Olosega for his own benefit, and came to be trusted by the natives of neighboring Atafu, despite having a reputation in Olosega for being cruel and exceedingly brutal. Jennings was able to convince the chief of Atafu (known as Foli) to come on board. Most of the Atafuan men never made it to South America, getting discharged on the way for being too old and weak. By the time Jennings and the Peruvians left, there were only six adult males remaining on Atafu, with the rest of the inhabitants being women or children.

A large number of Tokelauans didn't realize they were captives on board, as they came expecting to trade. Some broke loose and tried to leap overboard once they figured out what was happening. Escapees were usually recaptured by the armed boat crews who pursued them. They were seized and hauled back inboard; those that continued to resist were shot or killed. Following the slave raids, Tokelau was repopulated with settlers from other Polynesian islands. The new population also included American and European migrants who had intermarried with local Tokelauan women.

The islands became a British protectorate in 1877 and were annexed by Britain in 1916, being included with the Gilbert and Ellice Islands colony. New Zealand took over administration of Tokelau in 1925, and in 1948 it was included within the territorial boundaries of their country. Tokelau was largely ignored by New Zealand over the next four decades. In this period, the villagers had only sporadic contact with the other islanders or the administrative powers of New Zealand. In the mid-1980s, New Zealand anthropologist Antony Cooper carried out an ethnographic study of the growing prevalence of aid to Tokelau. Hooper conducted this study with fellow New Zealander Judith Huntsman, had already devoted years of anthropological attention to Tokelau. In this particular work, Hooper described how outside investment intending to produce local development during the 1980s had only served to produce relations of dependency. He was of the opinion that these investments were not conducive to generating locally sustainable growth. The mid-1980s also saw a significant breakthrough in the relationship between Tokelau and New Zealand, and Tokelau began a move towards greater independence, which still continues today.

=== Other Islands ===
==== Clipperton Island ====
The remote eastern Pacific atoll was uninhabited when discovered by outsiders in the 1520s. Some claim Portuguese explorer Ferdinand Magellan was the first to find it in 1521, which would make Clipperton one of the first Pacific landmasses to be reached by Europeans. Others believe it was discovered by Spaniard Alvaro Saavedra Cerón on 15 November 1528. Clipperton Island was named after British pirate John Clipperton, who was said to have stayed there in 1705, with 21 other mutineers. There have since been rumors that Clipperton may have hid treasures.

In 1708, sailors from the French ships Princess and Découverte reached the atoll and named it Ile de la Passion, annexing it for France. The first scientific expedition took place in 1725 by Frenchman M.Bocage, who lived on the atoll for several months. The exploitation of the guano in the Pacific during the 19th century revived interest in the atoll, after many years of no human inhabitation. American Guano Mining Company claimed it under the Guano Islands Act of 1856; Mexico also claimed it due to activities undertaken there as early as 1848–1849. On 17 November 1858, Emperor Napoleon III annexed it as part of the French colony of Tahiti. This did not settle the ownership question. Mexico reasserted its claim late in the 19th century and established a military outpost on Clipperton in 1897.

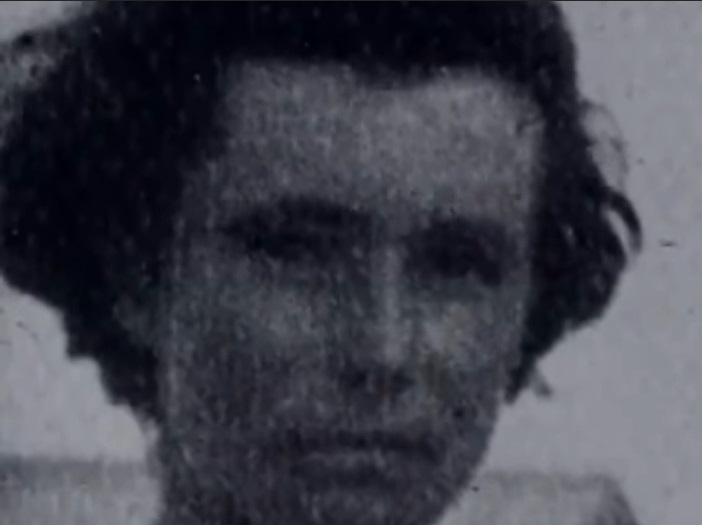
Clipperton Island survivor Alicia Rovira Arnaud.

The British Pacific Island Company acquired the rights to guano deposits in 1906 and began working in conjunction with the Mexican government to establish a colony. A lighthouse was erected, and by 1914 approximately 100 settlers were living there. These people were Mexicans of European or Mixed European descent. They were sent supplies every two months via a ship from Acapulco, however, the escalation of fighting in the Mexican Revolution diverted the suppliers’ attention. The regular resupply visits soon ceased and the inhabitants were left to their own devices. By 1915, the inhabitants were dying, and the survivors wanted to leave on the American war ship Lexington which had reached the atoll in late 1915. The Mexican government refused, declaring that evacuation was not necessary. All the men, except for Victoriano Álvarez, died from either malnutrition or failed escape attempts. As the last living man, Álvarez proclaimed himself "king" at some point, and took to enslaving, murdering, and raping the remaining women and children.

Álvarez's reign ended when the women successfully managed to kill him. The survivors, consisting of three women and seven children, were rescued from the island by a passing US ship in 1917.

No further attempts at permanent colonization have occurred since the 1910s, and Clipperton Island is currently a possession of France. Humans last inhabited it during World War II, when the US Navy occupied the atoll. France began maintaining a humanless automatic weather station on Clipperton in 1980.

==== Galápagos Islands ====
The eastern Pacific archipelago of the Galápagos Islands is believed to have never been inhabited by Indigenous people of the Americas or Oceania. The islands were discovered by chance in 1535 when Spanish navigators were sailing from Panama to Peru, remaining unclaimed.

Many early visitors to the Galápagos Islands were pirates who found it a convenient base to protect their stores. Black rats made their way onto the islands through the ships of these pirates, having a disastrous impact on the native wildlife. Whalers also frequently took the giant Galápagos tortoises with them, not only because their meat was rich in protein when consumed, but because their fat could produce gallons of cooking oil. It is estimated that 100,000 giant tortoises were taken from the islands over an 80-year period. The first human recorded to have lived there was a man called Patrick Watkins. He became stranded on the islands in 1807, and he inhabited them for several years. Watkins survived by trading his Galápagos-grown vegetables in exchange for items from visitors. Eventually, he managed to steal a vessel and escape to Ecuador. The Galápagos Islands subsequently became internationally recognized, following a 1835 visit from British naturalist Charles Darwin, with the unique wildlife of the islands greatly influencing Darwin's theory on natural selection.

South American country Ecuador officially took possession in 1832. Ecuador's interest in the islands came about after lichen orchilla (used for dyestuff) was discovered in commercial quantities. For the first 100 years under Ecuadorian rule, the islands were used as a penal colony, and as such were primarily inhabited by a select number of South American convicts. Initial attempts at populating the islands with more traditional home-steaders were unsuccessful, with permanent human settlement only beginning around the beginning of the 20th century. These settlements included not only South Americans, but also Europeans, and were commercial in nature, involving the exploitation of salt, sulfur, fish and other local products. Early settlers brought domesticated animals with them, such as cats, dogs and donkeys. Within a few generations, escaped cats and dogs became relentless hunters of the native wildlife. Cats had a particularly detrimental effect on the iguana and flightless bird population.

In 1929, a German couple named Friedrich Ritter and Dore Strauch began residing on a part of the archipelago called Floreana Island. The Ritters made a rugged home out of volcanic rocks and twisted pieces of wood. Their experiences were published in a German newspaper, and Ritter encouraged more Germans to visit the islands, which led to an increase in European tourism. Some tried to settle there with non-commercial intentions like the Ritters had, but such people often found Floreana Island too difficult to live on, and left after a brief stay. A couple who did decide to permanently settle were Heinz and Margret Wittmer, who also brought along their son. The couple did not develop a close relationship with the Ritters, but the two groups generally tolerated each other, and were there to help each other in times of need. Shortly after the Wittmers arrived, they were followed by Austrian woman Eloise Wehrborn de Wagner-Bosquet. She was accompanied by her two German boyfriends, Rudolf Lorenz and Robert Philippson. They announced to the other residents that they planned to build a grand hotel on Floreana. Wagner-Bosquet was considered an attractive woman, and greeted passing ships wearing a skimpy outfit which included a whip and pistol. She told the sailors grandiose stories from back in Europe, and ships passing through the Pacific would go out of their way just to see her.

Eventually, the relationship between the European residents on Floreana deteriorated. The Wittmers and Ritters suspected that Wagner-Bosquet was going through their mail and spreading lies about them to passing ships, while Wagner-Bosquet had turned on Lorenz. Her other boyfriend Philippson physically abused him on a regular basis once she turned on him, which led to Lorenz taking refuge at the Wittmer home. Life on the island had become intolerable for most of the residents at this point. On 27 March 1934, Wagner-Bosquet and Philippson disappeared. According to Margret Wittmer, they had boarded a passing yacht headed for Tahiti. Her story is believed to be suspicious, since there was no record of such a yacht entering Galápagos at that time, and since they never turned up in Tahiti or anywhere else. After their disappearance, Lorenz attempted to get back to Germany. He hired a Norwegian fisherman to take him to the Galápagos's San Cristóbal Island, where he could catch a ferry to South America. They also disappeared, until their mummified bodies were discovered months later on an uninhabited part of the archipelago, Marchena Island. in November 1934, Friedrich Ritter died, seemingly of food poisoning, after eating poorly preserved chicken. According to the Wittmers, he claimed before dying that it was Dore Strauch who had poisoned him. Strauch denied this, and she returned to Germany not long afterwards. The disappearance of Wagner-Bosquet and Philippson and the death of Lorenz remain unsolved. Dore Strauch went on to write a book about her experiences on the Galápagos Islands.

The unsolved cases were made into a 2013 film titled The Galapagos Affair: Satan Came to Eden. The film was a co-production between the United States, Ecuador, Germany and Norway, featuring the voices of several European actors, as well as Australian Toni Collette. In 1972, the Mexican film Vanessa was also partly shot on the Galápagos Islands, utilizing a cast of mainly European actors. Scenes from the 2003 American film Master and Commander: The Far Side of the World were shot on the Galápagos Islands in late 2002. The film was directed by Australian Peter Weir, and starred New Zealand actor Russell Crowe. At the time it was incorrectly labelled as the first motion picture to be shot on the Galápagos, due to the obscurity of Vanessa.

The human population has been steadily increasing since the 1970s. This has been as a result both of the growth in tourism as well as the opportunities for fishing in the area. It reportedly increased by 60% between 1999 and 2005. However, in 1998 steps were taken to try and stop the growth of the population, which have not been entirely effective. The 25,000 current inhabitants are mostly Ecuadorians, and the racial makeup reflects this, with 76% being Mestizo (half-European/half-Indigenous), and a smaller percentage being purely European.

==== Jarvis Island ====
Jarvis Island, a remote coral island, was uninhabited when discovered by Europeans. Out of all the United States Minor Outlying Islands, Jarvis has among the least evidence to suggest prehistoric human activity. Jarvis Island's first known human contact came in 1821, when Captain Brown of the British ship Eliza Frances sighted it. The ship was owned by Edward, Thomas and William Jarvis. The United States, located over 5,000 kilometers away, claimed possession of Jarvis Island under the Guano Islands Act of 1856. The act gave American citizens the right to claim any unclaimed, uninhabited islands for the purpose of mining guano, or bird droppings. The island was additionally visited by whaling vessels up until the 1870s. The guano deposits ceased being exploited by the United States in 1879, and in 1889 Britain annexed Jarvis, however, they also did not exploit it. The United States became interested in Jarvis again during 1935. American settlers began living on Jarvis Island that year; this was to maintain a weather station and plan a landing field. A settlement called Millersville was established on the west coast of the island. These 130 individuals were mainly native Hawaiians, with only a small number being European American. At that time, it was unclear who owned Jarvis and other small uninhabited islands in the same general area. The beginning of World War II — and the Japanese military's advancement across the Pacific — made it crucial for the United States to gain ownership of such islands. Due to Japanese advancement, the settlers were eventually evacuated in 1942, with none being killed or injured. Jarvis Island is currently an unincorporated territory of the United States, and there are no human inhabitants.

==== Juan Fernández Islands ====
The archipelago was discovered in 1574 by Spanish explorer Juan Fernández. Like with the Galápagos Islands, also in the far eastern Pacific, there is no evidence of Indigenous American or Polynesian settlement prior. However, there is a relative lack of historical research regarding the area in the Pacific between Easter Island and South America, meaning that an early Polynesian connection cannot be conclusively ruled out for either archipelago.

Fernández lived on the islands for some years, stocking them with goats and pigs. After his departure, the Juan Fernández islands were visited only occasionally. Scottish seaman Alexander Selkirk was stranded there between 1704 and 1709, and his adventures are believed to have inspired Daniel Defoe's Robinson Crusoe. The islands were used as shelters by whalers and buccaneers around this time, and then were permanently settled by fishermen and pastoralists by the late 19th century. Chile had gained possession of the islands earlier that century, and used them as penal colonies on many occasions, particularly for political prisoners.

Santa Clara Island is currently uninhabited, and most live in the village of Robinson Crusoe, on Bahía Cumberland. The majority of the archipelago's 900 inhabitants are Europeans descended from the first families. Analysis of the mitochondrial haplogroups found in the present-day population revealed that 79.1% of islanders carried European haplogroups, compared to 60.0% for the mainland Chileans from Santiago. The Juan Fernández rock lobster (Jasus frontalis) supports 70% of the economy, and the inhabitants have long followed rules to protect their lobsters and livelihoods.

On 27 February 2010, a tsunami struck the islands, following the 8.8 magnitude earthquake off Maule, Chile. There were at least at least 8 deaths. The only warning the islanders had come from a 12-year-old girl, who noticed the sudden drawback of the sea that forewarns of the arrival of a tsunami wave, saving many of her neighbours from harm.

== Relationship with Indigenous Oceanians ==
=== Labor recruitment ===
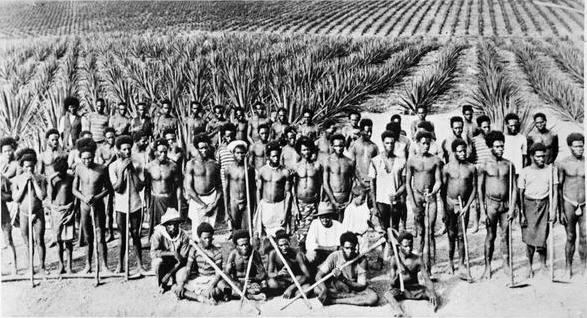
Workers from various Oceanian countries at a pineapple farm in Queensland, Australia, 1890s.

Starting in 1863, natives from Vanuatu, the Solomon Islands, Papua New Guinea, New Caledonia, Fiji, Kiribati and Tuvalu were recruited by European Australians to form a labor force, for the sugar industry in Queensland and other industries. The thought at the time was that whites could not labor properly in the tropics of far north Queensland. It has been established a proportion of these individuals were kidnapped/coerced by Australians, as was the case with Oceanian German colonists and Guatemalan/Mexican coffee plantation recruiters in the 19th century. This period in Australia's history causes debate, since a significant number of islanders are known to have come at their own free will. Kidnapping-type scenarios occurred most frequently in the Solomon Islands according to author Clive Moore. In his 1985 book, Kanaka – A History of Melanesian Mackay, Moore wrote, "the [Solomon] Islanders often thought the men on the big ships wanted to barter ... but when they tried to trade ... their canoes were smashed and they were forced on board."

Many of the islanders faced harsh working conditions and separation from their cultures. Two groups of Australians who were against these practices were missionaries and labor unions, while a faction within the media and government also expressed concern. The labor unions opposed the presence of the islanders since they believed that white laborers were losing work opportunities, and that wages were being maintained at artificially low levels. It has been claimed that early on their conditions were as close to slavery as the laws of the era would allow, but in the late 1860s, official contracts became commonplace. Towards the end of the 19th century, communities had been formed, and certain people were able to take control of their working lives, running their own farms. Their overall outcome contrasted those of the Kiribatians taken to work on coffee plantations in Guatemala and Mexico. Only 250 of the 1,200 working in Central America ended up surviving.

Following its independence from Britain in 1901, the Australian government passed the Immigration Restriction Act and Pacific Island Labourers Act, which is considered to be part of the wider White Australia policy. The act ordered the deportation of the workers to their home islands. They lobbied against deportation, arguing they had married local residents, had children at school, owned farms and were practicing Christianity. Deportations began in 1904 with approximately 7,000 being forced to leave. Following strong lobbying, exemptions were made for 1,200 individuals, primarily land owners and/or husbands of Australian women. The islanders who avoided deportation did not face the same level of discrimination from Australians as Aboriginals did. The main restriction put upon them was the Liquor Act 1912, which prohibited the supply of alcohol.

=== Early perceptions ===
European Australians are documented as making trips to areas in Micronesia other than Kiribati during the late 19th century, due to the copra trade which had begun to flourish in the 1870s. Andrew Farrell, an Australian trader visiting Micronesia, recounted in his journals, "In return for copra, islanders first demanded tobacco, and it had to be the best. Scores of other articles were in demand, like cloths, axes and knives, hand sowing machines, scissors, needles and thread, mirrors and cones, hooks and line, pots and pans, mouth organs, rice, hard biscuits, beads, perfume and, in the Gilberts and Marshalls, rifles, flintlock muskets, revolvers, powder and shot."

The first Australians to live in Micronesia were beachcombers from ships, including five Sydney men who deserted their fellow whalers to live on Nauru for a few months in 1837. They had a distorted view of the Nauruans, who were under the negative influence of other white beachcombers, described as "dictators" on the island. One of the earliest Australians to have lived in western Micronesia was John James Mahlmann. Originally, he worked as a second officer on a trading ship between Sydney and Auckland. After a failed gold prospecting expedition to New Zealand in 1864, he joined a trading ship that took him to Japan, China, and the Micronesian region (including the Gilbert Islands, the Marshall Islands and Pohnpei). He arrived in the Marshall Islands after getting shipwrecked, and subsequently lived in Pohnpei for two years. In 1918, he wrote Reminiscences of an Ancient Mariner, which included accounts not only of his time in Micronesia, but also Hawaii, which he later went on to reside in. Australians came to view Micronesia as a mysterious place in the early 20th century, due to Japan's occupation of nearly all the area, which lasted until World War II.

Since the late 19th century, they have also had significant long-term contact with Papua New Guinea, creating a vast archival record of travel. The first large-scale movement of European Australians to the area began in the search for gold. Prospectors in the 1870s were mostly unsuccessful, but this was not the case during the 1890s, and greater numbers of Australian diggers had begun arriving by then. The Australian perception of Papua New Guinea differed when compared to their perception of Micronesian or Polynesian islands. Their early narratives of Papua New Guinea were more akin to that of Africa, Asia, and South America, describing mythical creatures, savage inhabitants and hidden fortunes. Australian representations of Papua New Guinea shared close similarities with their depictions of Melanesia in general.

New Caledonia and Vanuatu in Melanesia were often lumped together by Australians. Both had French colonial influence, and were seen as places of conflict in the 19th century. Australian observations of violence between French settlers and New Caledonia's native Kanaks reflected greater concerns about the legitimacy of French colonial rule in Oceania. Australian journalist John Stanley James wrote extensively about his travels in New Caledonia during the 1870s and 1880s, helping to inform Australians about the tensions there. France began to market New Caledonia as a holiday destination in the early 1900s, which led to an increase in Australian tourism. An additional factor in the Australian tourism was their growing curiosity towards New Caledonia's convict heritage and French inhabitants. Visitors recognized the parallels between New Caledonia's convict penal system and their own, but in their accounts they omitted any mentions of the Kanaks, who were slowly becoming isolated from the rest of the population. Early Australian visits to Vanuatu were characterized by confusion at the joint Anglo-French colonial partnership, and were more focused on the native population. Australian political interest in New Caledonia and Vanuatu had diminished by World War I. The war had shown France to be an ally rather than an enemy, helping end suspicions towards French colonialism. For example, a large scale Kanak rebellion in 1917 did not elicit the same response in Australia as an earlier 1878 conflict had.

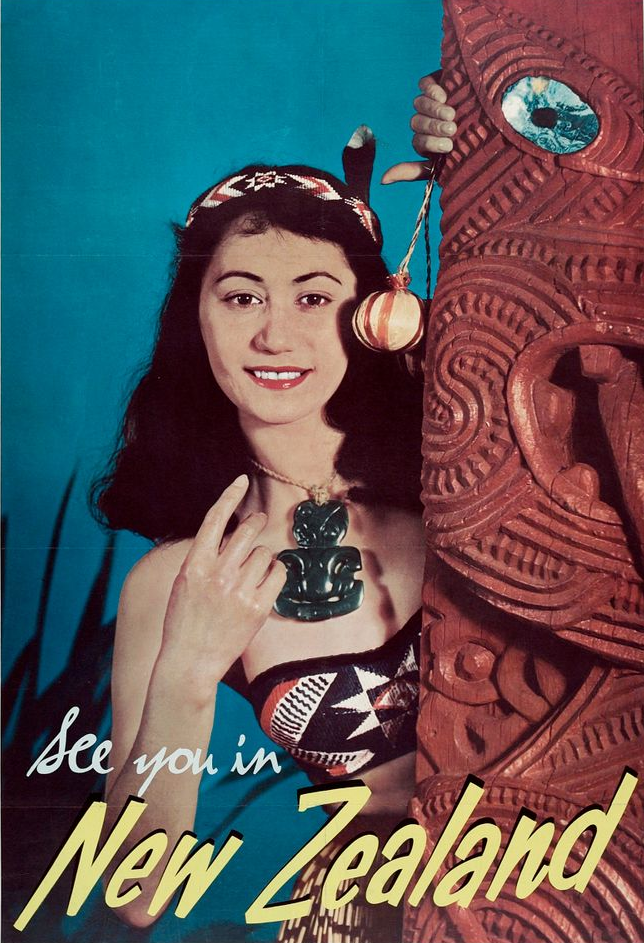
A New Zealand tourism poster promoting the Polynesian culture of the country, c. 1960.

At the beginning of the 20th century, New Zealand grew distinct from Australia in its relationship with Oceania. Having chosen not to be part of Australia's Federation in 1901, New Zealand advocated a nation that was more respectable than Australia, one without a convict past and with indigenous people who were considered racially superior to the Aboriginal Australians. New Zealand gained possession of several Polynesian islands in the early 20th century, and aspired to also add Samoa and Tonga to its colonial acquisitions, due to claims of scientific evidence of Polynesian homogeneity. New Zealand had a stronger connection with their Māori population than Australians did with their Aboriginal population, and they became the leading center for technical and higher education among Polynesians, with their openness to these people contrasting the racial immigration policies of Australia. Australians displayed less political interest in Polynesia, with many travelling there as tourists. Compared to New Zealand, Australia had more of an influence over Melanesia and Micronesia, as suggested by their close ties with Papua New Guinea and Nauru.

Australians rarely considered New Zealand part of the same region as other Polynesian islands, despite its geographic location and Māori origins. Initial Australian travelers focused on New Zealand's European architecture, public works and modern transportation, comparing its rate of progress to that of their colony. Māori were usually only ever mentioned by Australians in comparison to other Pacific Islanders, and in reference to their admirable status as Polynesians. When Australian author John Cromar visited Honolulu, he noted that, "the Hawaiians were a very superior type of native, and similar to the Māoris of New Zealand, being light-skinned, and having long straight hair and perfect physique."

=== Scholarly work and government aid ===
From the 1950s onward, Europeans living in Australia have made an effort to try to understand the often obscure histories of the islands around them. The historian Jim Davidson was simultaneously foundation professor of Pacific history at the Australian National University, author of Samoa mo Samoa [Samoa for the Samoans] (1967) and advisor in the drafting of constitutions for the newly independent Cook Islands, Nauru, Micronesia and Papua New Guinea. Under his watch, the Journal of Pacific History commenced publication in 1966, which some believe announced Australia as the major center for scholarship on the Pacific/Oceania. At the Australian National University in 1960, the art historian Bernard Smith wrote European Vision and the South Pacific 1768-1850, A study in the history of art and ideas, while Australian geographer Oskar Spate wrote an authoritative three-volume history of the Pacific, published between 1979 and 1988. In 1980, former Australian National University student Greg Dening, who later taught in Melbourne, revised his Harvard doctoral dissertation as Islands and Beaches, which was an anthropologically based history of the Pacific.

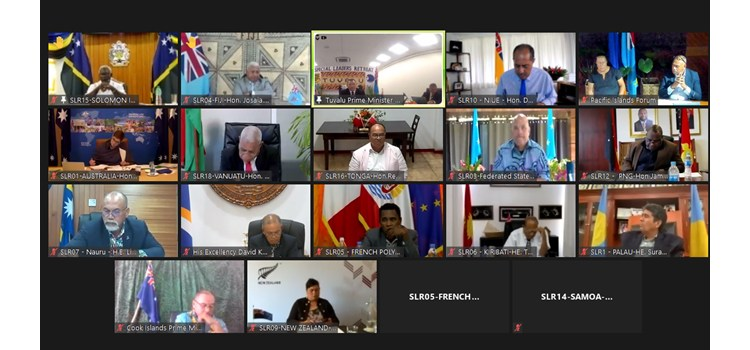
A 2021 Pacific Islands Forum meeting, which was held via Zoom. The PIF is an inter-governmental organization for the sovereign states of Oceania, including the European-majority nations of Australia (first in second row) and New Zealand (second in fourth row).

Australia are currently the biggest donors of aid to the Oceania region. The next biggest donors, New Zealand and China, were reported as having only donated one sixth of Australia's aid up until 2017. Additionally, Australia and New Zealand are the region's primary trading partners. New Zealand in particular has substantial trade with Samoa and Tonga. Australia is the main development partner of the Solomon Islands, providing $187 million of Official Development Assistance (ODA) in 2018–19. During that same timeframe, Australia provided $572.2 million to Papua New Guinea, as well as pledging around $5–60 million to most other countries in the region.

In 2012, the Australian government launched a $320 million program titled Pacific Women Shaping Pacific Development, to improve the political, economic and social opportunities of women in all regions of the Pacific. The program was conceived to last up until 2022. Between 2012 and 2016, the Australian government also claims to have educated 8,500 school children in the Federated States of Micronesia and the Marshall Islands about climate change mitigation and disaster risk management.

Francis X. Hezel, a European American priest who moved to Micronesia in 1963, is well known in the area for his scholarly and educational work. The Micronesian Seminar, known as MicSem, was founded by Hezel in 1972. It is a private non profit, non governmental organization that engages in public education, with a purpose to assist the people of Micronesia in reflecting on life in their islands under the impact of change in recent years. Hezel has also written several books related to Micronesia.

== Race mixing ==
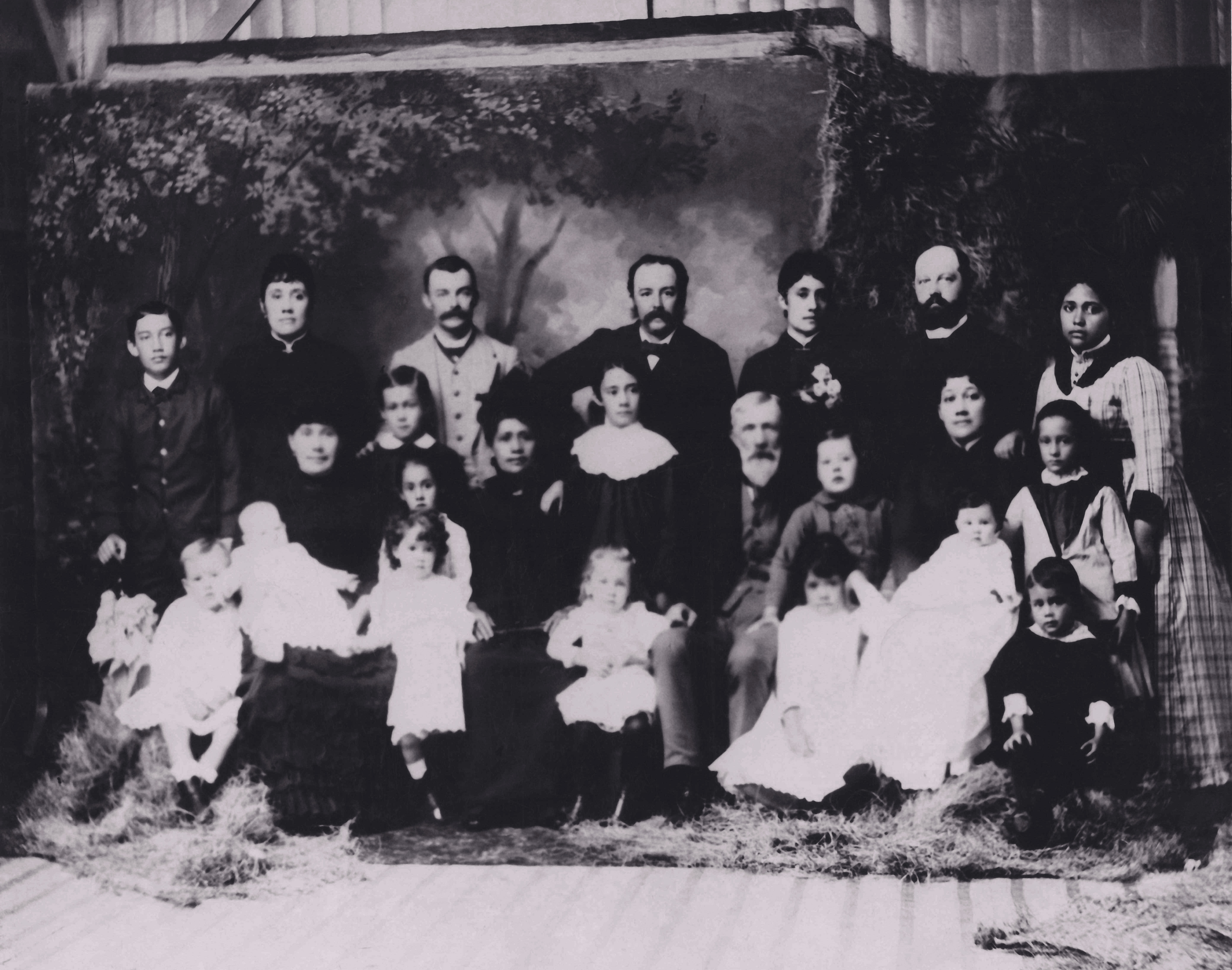
German immigrant Hermann A. Widemann had a large family with his Hawaiian wife Mary Kaumana, 1886.

In Australia, New Zealand and Hawaii, mixing between Europeans and native ethnicities is common, with many having mixed race backgrounds. The history of European New Zealanders mixing with native Māori dates back to before 1840, when the Treaty of Waitangi was signed to give Māori equal rights. Pākehā (European) whalers, sealers and traders established liaisons with Māori women, resulting in mixed race children very early on in New Zealand's colonial history.

On 4 December 1984, ten indigenous Kanaks from New Caledonia were gunned down on a road in their village, with this event coming to be known as the Hienghène Massacre. The perpetrators were against the Kanak independence movement, and considered themselves European New Caledonian. This was despite the fact that most were descendant from interracial unions between white settlers and the Melanesian Kanak women, which was evident in their skin tone and physical characteristics. The massacre was viewed by the pro-independence Kanak population as a desperate attempt to prove their Europeanness and reject their Melanesianness. Defence lawyers used the men's mixed background as proof that the massacre had not been born of racial hatred.

== Sports ==
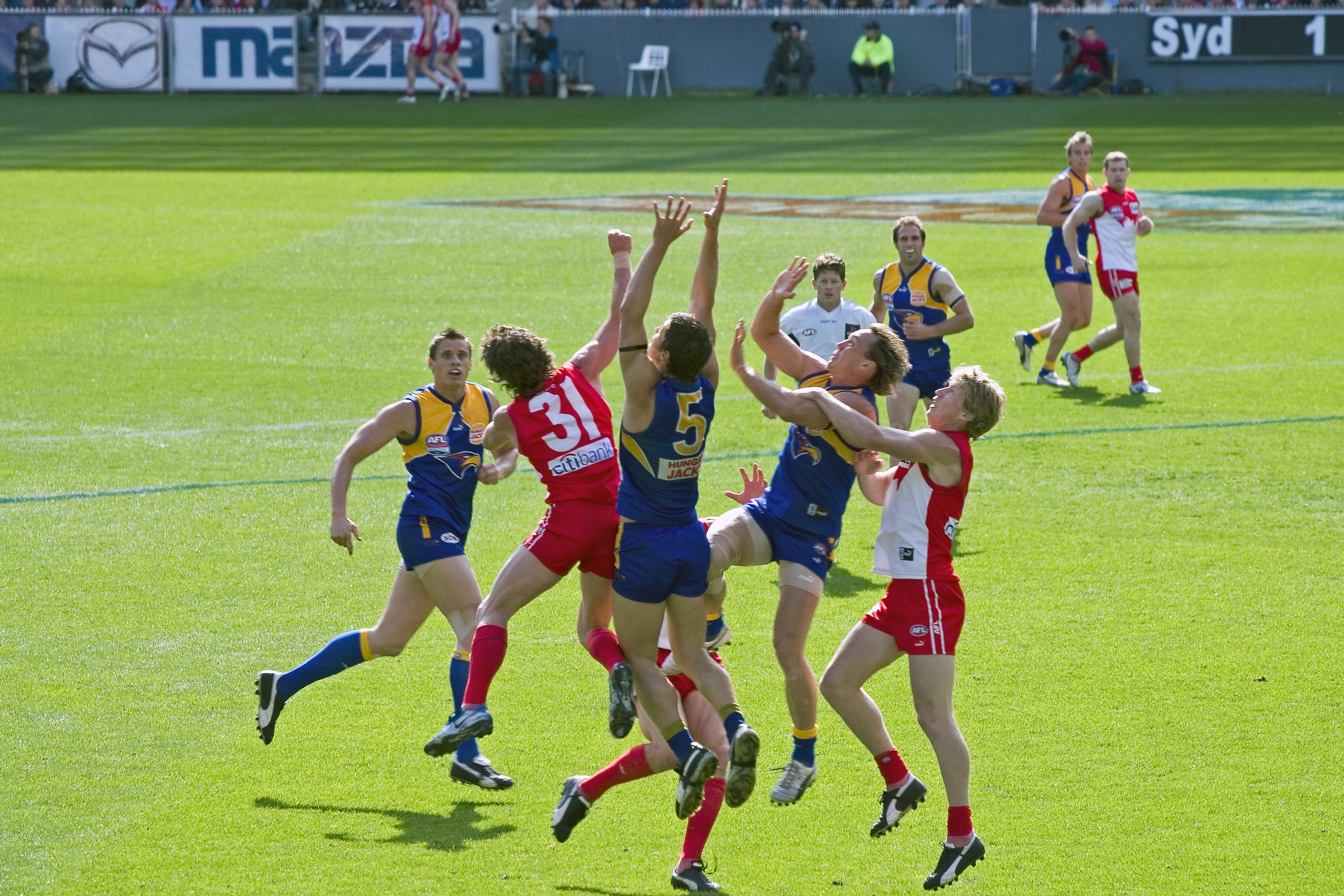
Australian rules footballers from the Sydney Swans and West Coast Eagles during the 2005 AFL Grand Final.

Early European Australians are credited with pioneering the sport known as Australian rules football, which may have been influenced by the Aboriginal sport of Marn Grook. They have successfully exported the sport to Oceanian countries which do not have a significant European population, such as Papua New Guinea and Nauru. When continental Europeans began arriving in large numbers during the 20th century, they formed Association football clubs (termed soccer clubs due to the prevalence of Australian rules and rugby). Examples of such clubs include Melbourne Knights (formed by Croatian immigrants), Marconi Stallions (formed by Italian immigrants) and Sydney Olympic (formed by Greek immigrants). They were all replaced at the top level with new clubs in 2005, due to fears that their ethnic-based identities were discriminatory. Many continental European Australians from the second generation onward have also since taken to Australian rules or rugby league.

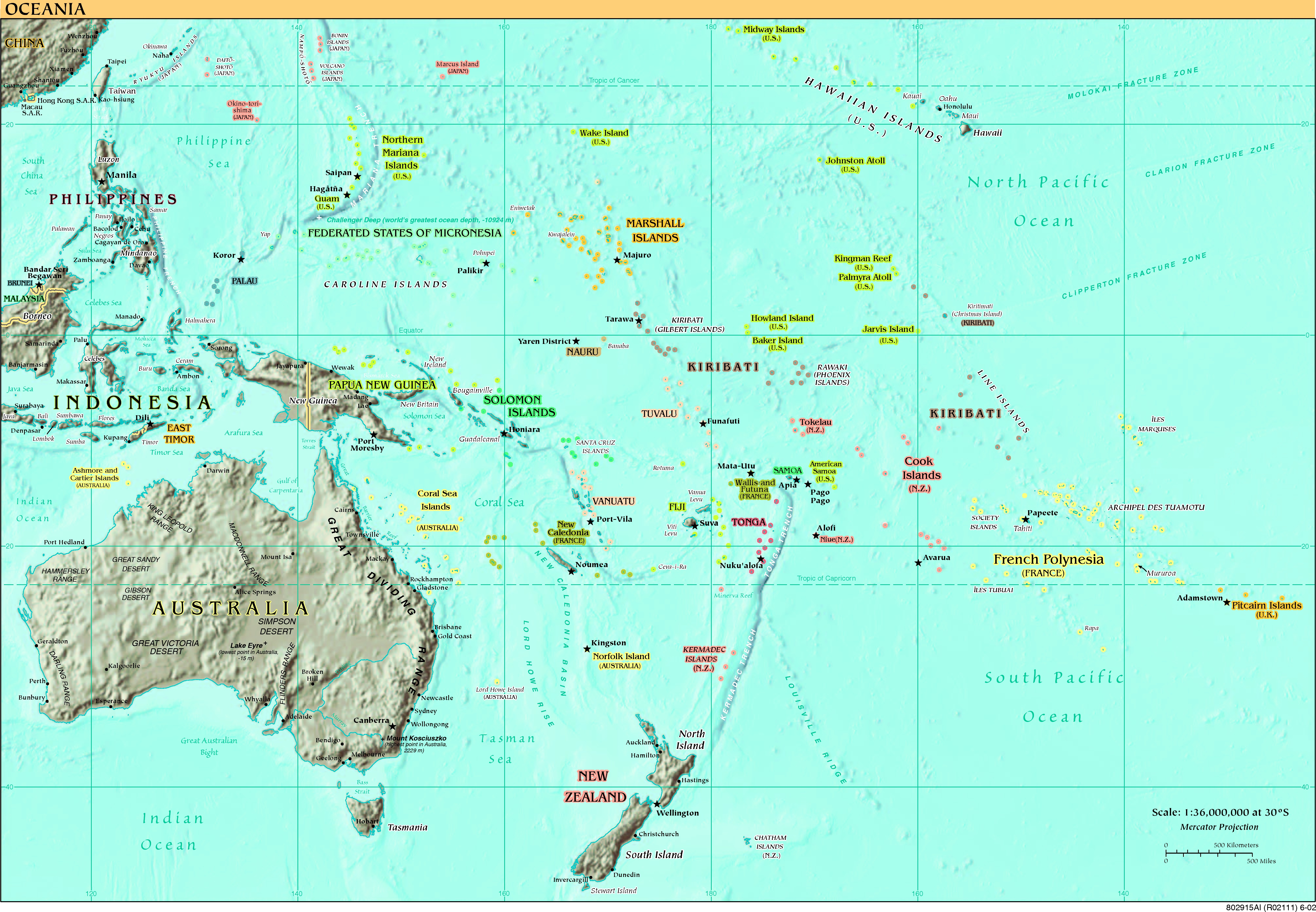
Oceania

== Current European population in Oceania ==
The total population of people that have European ancestry in Oceania is over 26,000,000, with the inclusion of the population of Hawaii and the exclusion of Indonesia.

- Australia (European Australian) – 76% of the population or roughly 19,480,000 based on the 2016 census.
- Coral Sea Islands - 100% of the population. There are only 4 inhabitants in total, all meteorologists working at a station on Willis Island. They are of European Australian origin.
- Pitcairn Islands - Nearly all of the population of 47 have some form of European ancestry, they are Euronesian (Polynesian and European), with ancestry from Britain and Tahiti. Exact figures are not available.
- Norfolk Island – About 50% British-Polynesian from Pitcairn Island (1,070 people) and 50% British ancestry mainly via Australia (1,070 people).
- Galápagos Islands – 85% of the population or roughly 21,000 have some form of European ancestry, 76% are Mestizos (half Indigenous American-half European), while 9% are solely European.
- New Zealand (New Zealand European) – 71.76% of the population or 3,372,708 people based on the 2018 census.
- Easter Island - Based on the 2002 census, 39% of the population or 1,478 have some form of European ancestry, they are either mixed Rapa Nui-European, Mestizo (half Indigenous American-half European), mixed Rapa Nui-Mestizo or solely European. People of mixed Rapa Nui-European blood are considered by the Chilean government, generic Chilean social views, & the whole Spanish-speaking region as Mestizos, as they possess European blood and Rapa Nui are native settlers of the island. However, pure blooded Rapa Nui are not genetically related to any Indigenous Americans, and do not share the same culture. The population of Easter Island had increased from 3,791 in 2002 to 7,750 in 2017, as such these figures may not be necessarily accurate today.
- Juan Fernández Islands
- New Caledonia (Caldoche) – 27.1% of the population or about 71,700; the territory is part of France.
- Christmas Island (Note: Australian external territory; often considered a part of Asia due to geographic proximity.) (Note: Transcontinental country.) – About 25% (460) of the population had European ancestry in 2016 (generic European Australian ancestry, as well as immediate English and Irish ancestry). 48% (884) of the population were listed as having undetermined ancestry in the census, meaning the figure for Europeans may not be accurate.
- Hawaii – 22.9% of the population (2020 U.S. census)
- Cocos (Keeling) Islands – An estimated 100 ethnic Europeans live on the West Island. They make up 18.38% of the total population.
- French Polynesia – 10% of the population (mostly French) or 26,700, and 6-8% are Euronesian (Polynesian and European ancestry).
- Northern Mariana Islands – Figures regarding Europeans living in the Northern Mariana Islands are not kept track of. A combined total of 15.2% (8,203) are listed as either "Other" or multiple races in the 2010 census, these individuals could be interpreted as being European and mixed European.
- Niue – About 12% (194) of the population have European ancestry. This figure also includes Asian residents, meaning it may be slightly inaccurate.
- Cook Islands – Figures regarding Europeans living in the Cook Islands are not kept track of. A combined total of 11.9% (2,117) of the population are listed as "Other" in the 2011 census, which could be interpreted as encompassing Europeans.
- Fiji – Figures regarding Europeans living in Fiji are not kept track of. 10.9% (55,790) of the population are listed as "Other" in the 2012 census, which could be interpreted as encompassing Europeans.
- Nauru – Figures regarding Europeans living in Nauru are not kept track of. 9.1% (819) of the population are listed as "part Nauruan" or "Other" in the 2007 census, these individuals could be interpreted as being European or mixed European.
- Federated States of Micronesia – Figures regarding Europeans living in FS Micronesia are not kept track of. 8.9% (9,116) of the population are listed as "Other" in the 2020 census, which could be interpreted as encompassing Europeans.
- Samoa – 7.4% (14,493) of the population have some form of European ancestry, 7% are Euronesian (Polynesian and European ancestry) and 0.4% are solely European.
- Tokelau – Figures regarding Europeans living in Tokelau are not kept track of. A combined total of 6.4% (105) are listed as either "Other" or "Unspecified" in the 2019 census, these individuals could be interpreted as being European.
- American Samoa – Figures regarding Europeans living in American Samoa are not kept track of. A combined total of 3.9% (2,627) are listed as either "Other" or "Mixed" in the 2010 census, these individuals could be interpreted as being European or mixed European.
- Tonga – Figures regarding Europeans living in Tonga are not kept track of. A combined total of 3.1% (3,135) are listed as either "part-Tongan", "Other" or "Unspecified" in the 2016 census, these individuals could be interpreted as being European and mixed European.
- Guam – 2% of the population have Spanish and European American ancestry (2000 Census) or about 1,800 people. Guam has a history of Spanish settlement before 1900 and is now under US rule.
- Marshall Islands – Figures regarding Europeans living in the Marshall Islands are not kept track of. 2% (1,063) of the population are listed as "Other" in the 2006 census, which could be interpreted as encompassing Europeans.
- Kiribati – Figures regarding Europeans living in Kiribati are not kept track of. 1.8% (1,982) of the population are listed as "Other" in the 2015 census, which could be interpreted as encompassing Europeans.
- Palau – 1.2% or roughly 233 of the population are listed as White (European) in the 2020 census.
- Indonesia – 0.33% or roughly 900,000 of the population are Indo (mixed Europeans with Dutch and Native Indonesian ancestry). Figures regarding people with solely European ancestry are not available.
  - Papua – The province has a population of 4,303,707 as of 2020. Figures regarding Europeans living in Papua are not kept track of.
  - West Papua – The province has a population of 1,134,068 as of 2020. Figures regarding Europeans living in West Papua are not kept track of.
- Timor-Leste - There is a small mestiço population of mixed Portuguese and native descent.
- Vanuatu – Figures regarding Europeans living in Vanuatu are not kept track of. 0.8% (2,424) of the population are listed as "non-Melanesian" in the 2016 census, which could be interpreted as encompassing Europeans.
- Solomon Islands – Figures regarding Europeans living in the Solomon Islands are not kept track of. 0.3% (2,055) of the population are listed as "Other" in the 2009 census, which could be interpreted as encompassing Europeans.
- Papua New Guinea – The country has a population of 7,275,324 as of 2017. Figures regarding race are not available.
- Wallis and Futuna – Among the 11,558 residents, there is a small minority who were born in Metropolitan France or are of French descent. However, the exact figures are not known.
- Midway Atoll – The islands have a population of approximately 39 as of 2019. It is known that none of these individuals are Native Hawaiians, although there is no further information available. These are the only islands in the Hawaiian Archipelago that are not part of the state of Hawaii.
- Bonin Islands – Virtually all of the Bonin Islands' 2,440 inhabitants are Japanese citizens. This includes a proportion with ancestors from the United States and Europe. No exact figures are available.
  - Volcano Islands – There are 380 inhabitants on the Islands. Figures regarding race are not available.
  - Minami-Tori-shima (Also known as Marcus Island) – 0% of the population. There are no human inhabitants on the Island.
- Tuvalu – The census lists Tuvalu as being 96% Polynesian and 4% Micronesian. There is no "Other" category on the census, as such it could be interpreted that the country does not have residents of European origin.
- Baker Island – 0% of the population. There are no human inhabitants on the island.
- Howland Island – 0% of the population. There are no human inhabitants on the island. The island is considered uninhabitable, although there are indications of early visitors, most likely Micronesians or Polynesians drifting from windward islands.
- Jarvis Island – 0% of the population. There are no human inhabitants on the island.
- Johnston Atoll – 0% of the population. There are no human inhabitants on the island. It is closed to public entry, and limited access for management needs is only granted by Letter of Authorization from the United States Air Force and a Special Use Permit from the U.S. Fish and Wildlife Service.
- Kingman Reef – 0% of the population. There are no human inhabitants on the island.
- Wake Island – 0% of the population. There are no human inhabitants on the island. It is one of the most isolated islands in the world, and access is restricted by the United States government. The nearest inhabited island is Utirik Atoll in the Marshall Islands, 592 miles (953 kilometers) to the southeast.
- Ashmore and Cartier Islands – 0% of the population. There are no human inhabitants on the islands.
- Clipperton Island – 0% of the population. There have been no human inhabitants on the island since 1945.

The dominant European group of Australia are referred to as Anglo-Celtic Australians (although this does not include non-British Europeans); the proper term for Australians of European ancestry is European Australian. In New Zealand, the census gathers information on ethnicity, not ancestry. It shows the majority of the New Zealand population identify as New Zealand European. The term Pākehā used in some previous Censuses has a similar meaning.

== See also ==
- Greater Europe
- History of Australia
- History of New Zealand
- History of the Pacific Islands
- Settler colonialism
- European Australian
- History of Oceania
