= Immigration to the Western world =

Immigration to mainly European-descent countries

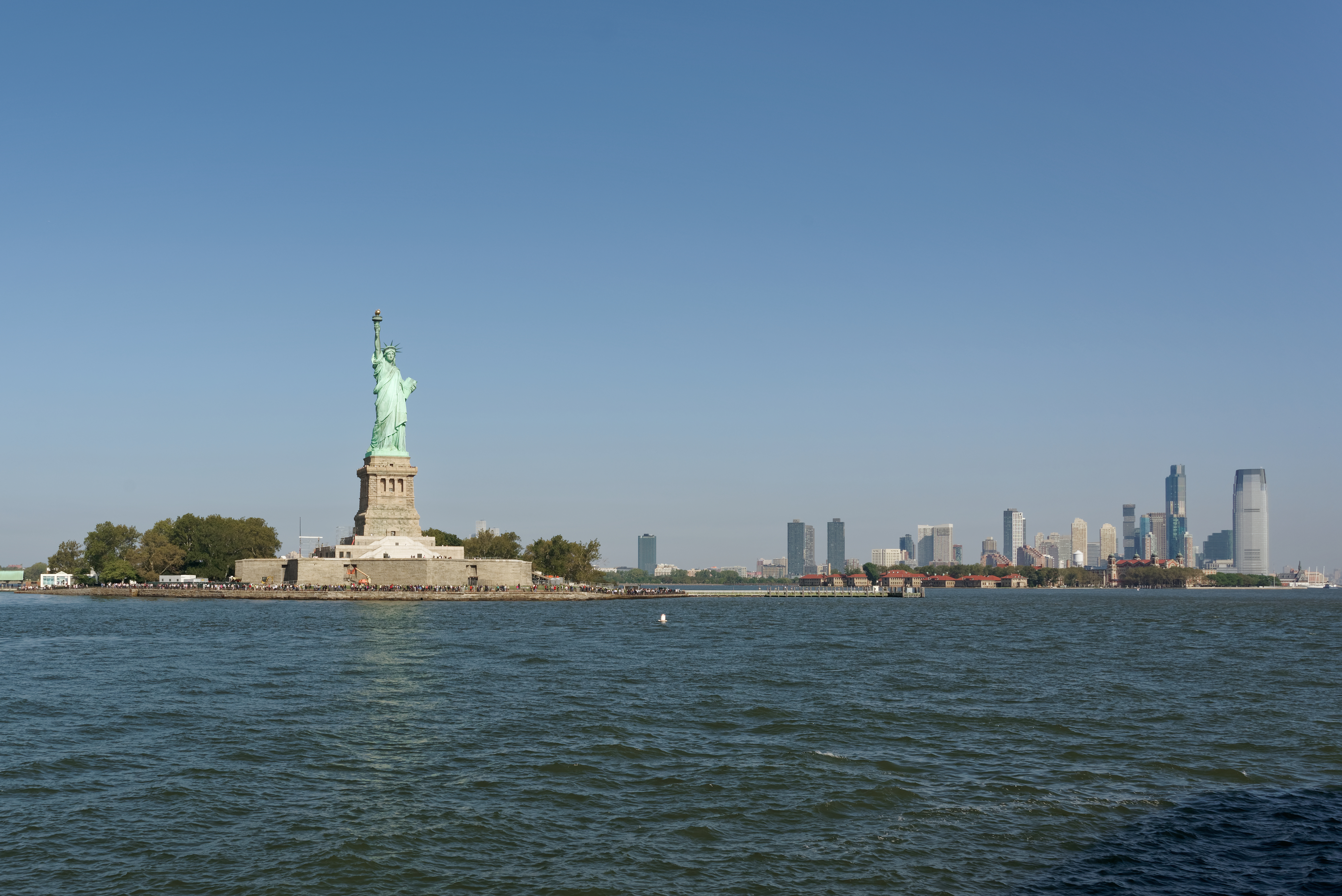
The Statue of Liberty, which has come to embody the American ideals surrounding immigration

Immigration has had a major influence on the demographics and culture of the Western world. Immigration to the West started happening in significant numbers during the 1960s and afterward, as Europe made its post-war economic recovery and the United States passed the Immigration and Nationality Act of 1965 allowing non-European immigration.

Immigration to the West has often been related to the West's colonial history; for example, immigration to Britain historically has come largely from former British colonies (generally as part of the broader Commonwealth migration.) Wars that Western countries have recently been involved in, and the fallout or flows of refugees associated with them, have also been tied to the inflow of immigration.

Significant debate has taken place around the economic and other benefits associated with immigration (particularly for low-skilled workers), with Western governments often more in favor of immigration than their constituents. Debate has also taken place around both the theory and current state of integration of the immigrants, with some favoring multiculturalism as a solution.

== History ==
In the United States, theories around immigration have historically revolved around the metaphor of a melting pot, wherein different kinds of immigrants would eventually become more homogeneous and Americanized over time, with such effects seen even today.

== Internal migration ==
There is significant migration between the countries of the European Union, where there is freedom of movement. Migration between OECD countries is also notable, though sometimes limited by cultural differences.

== Backlash ==
Backlash to immigration has impacted Western politics significantly; for example, Britain's decision to leave the European Union was informed partly by some of its voters' desire to reduce immigration. This backlash has helped far-right politics become more prevalent.

=== Illegal immigration ===
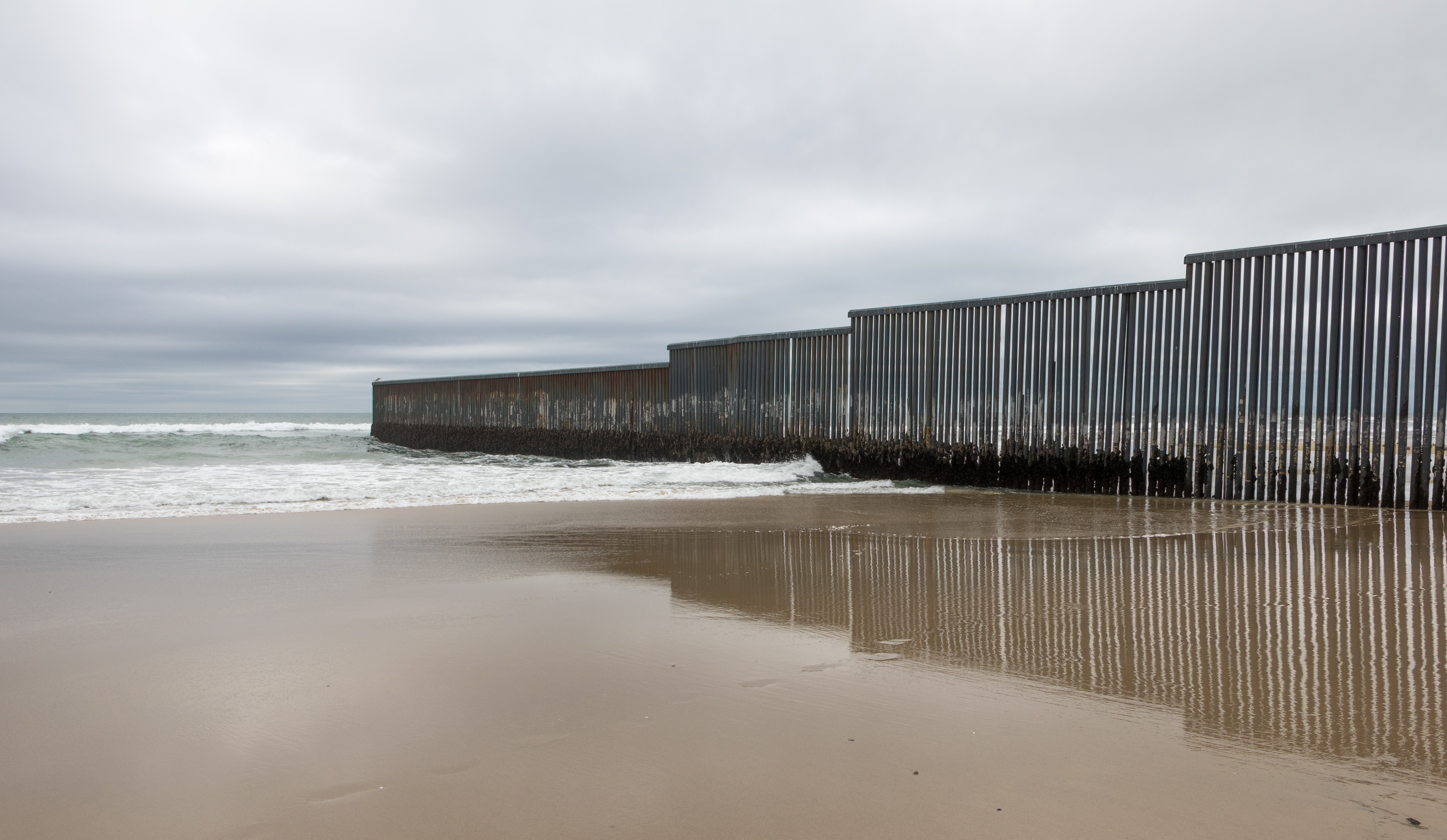
The US-Mexico border wall at Tijuana

There has been an increase in anti-immigration sentiment in the West in relation to illegal immigration. In the United States, right-wing politicians have called for a border wall with Mexico, and in European politics, accusations have been made of a "Fortress Europe" mentality.

=== Jewish immigration ===
From these early diasporic centers in the eastern Mediterranean, Jewish communities gradually moved into southern Europe (Italy, Greece), then into Iberia under Roman and later Islamic rule, and into northern and central Europe, forming the Ashkenazi communities along the Rhine by the early Middle Ages. Over time, Jews faced expulsions from numerous European regions, often driven by a combination of religious intolerance, economic scapegoating, accusations such as blood libel, and political motives - both by the political class as well as the general population. In England, King Edward I issued the 1290 expulsion edict after years of escalating restrictions, blaming Jews for economic tensions tied to moneylending regulations; the entire community was forced to leave, with property confiscated and many expelled under armed escort - the last Jews were burned to death in York by its citizens. Local Christian populations—frequently encouraged by clerics or pressured during periods of famine, plague, or war — accused Jews of usury, ritual crimes, or disloyalty. In many towns, resentment grew as Jews were tied to royal financial systems (such as the Rothschilds), making them targets when rulers imposed heavy taxes or when economic downturns left borrowers unable to repay debts. Popular hostility manifested in street violence, destruction of property, forced conversions, and public agitation for expulsion. During crises such as the Black Death, communities across the German lands and Switzerland massacred or burned their Jewish neighbours following accusations of well-poisoning. In Nazi Germany, Jews were blamed for the economic condition in the 1930s.

=== Muslim immigration ===
American responses to Muslim immigration have been influenced by the September 11 attacks. Within Europe, there has been a concerted backlash to Muslim immigration. Some feel that Muslim Europeans do not fully embody Western values, while others have focused on publicizing various violent incidents perpetrated by Muslims.

Some members of the Muslim diaspora have become more religious over time, either in response to hostility, or as a result of newer generations seeking a connection with their ancestral homeland and practices.

In Europe, certain countries have banned elements of Muslim-associated culture, as is the case with France's burqa ban.

==== Terrorism ====
Attention has been called to the rise of "lone-wolf" Islamist terror in Europe, which is partially motivated by anger from some European-born Muslims against their former colonial masters, and how it differs from the relative success of North America in ameliorating native-born Islamic terrorism.

=== Societal cohesion and cultural preservation ===
Some oppose immigration on the basis of a belief it increases cultural, ethnic, and religious diversity in a way that threatens native cultures and can impair social integration.

This hostility has been noted in the context of the European Union after it expanded to include Eastern Europe, as many migrated towards Western Europe.

=== Great Replacement ===
The Great Replacement (French: grand remplacement), also known as replacement theory or great replacement theory, is a debunked white nationalist far-right conspiracy theory coined by French author Renaud Camus. Camus's theory states that, with the complicity or cooperation of "replacist" elites, (Note: French: pouvoir/élite remplaciste) the ethnic French and white European populations are deliberately being replaced by non-white peoples—especially from Muslim-majority countries—through mass migration, demographic growth, and a drop in the birth rate of white Europeans. Since then, similar claims have been advanced in other national contexts, notably in the United States. A consensus of academic scholars have dismissed these claims of a conspiracy of "replacist" elites as rooted in a misunderstanding of demographic statistics and premised upon an unscientific, racist worldview.

==== Inspired attacks ====
Fears of the white race's extinction, and replacement theory in particular, have been cited by several accused perpetrators of mass shootings between 2018, 2019 and 2022.

Brenton Harrison Tarrant, the Australian terrorist responsible for the mass shootings at Al Noor Mosque and Linwood Islamic Centre in Christchurch, New Zealand, on 15 March 2019, that killed 51 people and injured 49, named his manifesto The Great Replacement..

Patrick Crusius, the suspect in the 2019 El Paso shooting, posted an online manifesto titled The Inconvenient Truth alluding to the "great replacement" and expressing support for "the Christchurch shooter" minutes before the attack. It spoke of a "Hispanic invasion of Texas" leading to "cultural and ethnic replacement" (alluding to the Reconquista) as justifications for the shooting.

The suspect accused in the 2022 Buffalo shooting listed the Great Replacement in a manifesto he had published prior to the attack.

== Statistics ==
- Between 2010 and 2017, over a period of eight years, more than one million Africans from Sub-Saharan Africa emigrated to Europe and the US.
- From 2018 to June 2023, over a period of five and half years, more than 780,000 Indian people renounced their Indian citizenship and emigrated to the following Western countries: US (328,619), Canada (161,917), Australia (131,883), UK (83,468), Italy (23,817), New Zealand (23,088), Germany (13,363), Netherlands (8,642), Sweden (8,531).
- Chinese emigration increased from 2000 onwards. By mid 2020, more than 4.6 million Chinese emigrated to the following Western countries: US (2,184,000), Canada (699,000), Australia (653,000), Italy (233,000), UK (208,000), Spain (179,000), New Zealand (144,000), Germany (143,000), France (126,000), and Netherlands (73,000).

== See also ==
- Immigration to Europe
- Immigration to the United States
- Immigration to Canada
- Immigration to Australia
- Immigration to New Zealand
- Colonial diaspora
- Immigration and crime
