= Racism in Muslim communities =

Racism within the Muslim world is a source of concern for people of color, particularly for Black Muslims and other Muslims of color. Black Muslims throughout the world report that they face racism from other Muslims who are of Arab, Asian, White, or other non-Black backgrounds. In countries where white people form the demographic majority, white Muslims may enjoy certain privileges over their non-white counterparts, including preferential treatment within the Muslim community, although both white Muslims and Black Muslims may be used in a tokenistic way in institutional settings to emphasize the supposed diversity of a Muslim organization. In Arab-Muslim majority countries, racism against Black Muslims and Asian Muslims, especially South Asian Muslims, is often ubiquitous. Racist attitudes and oppression perpetrated in the Arab-Muslim world against Black people is deeply connected to the long legacy of the Trans-Saharan slave trade, the Red Sea slave trade, and the Indian Ocean slave trade.

== Issues ==
In Western societies, both White Muslims and black Muslims may be used in a tokenistic way in institutional settings to emphasize the supposed diversity of a Muslim organization. White Muslims may be strategically placed "on the front stage for advertisement purposes". Black Muslims in France report that they are tokenized for diversity purposes in predominantly non-Black Muslim spaces that do not truly value or include Black Muslim voices.

=== Slavery ===
Islamic Law allowed for Muslims to enslave non-Muslims, unless they were dhimmis (protected minorities who had accepted Muslim rule), and slaves were therefore non-Muslims imported from non-Muslim lands outside of the Muslim world. By Islamic law, foreign non-Muslims (kafirs) were by definition legitimate targets for enslavement, since the Muslim world of dar al-islam was by definition at war with the non-Muslim world of dar al-harb ("House of War"). Historically, the religious border zones of the Muslim world have been slave supply zones, and slaves have been imported to the Muslim Middle East from both Europe North of the Middle East; Africa South of it and Central Asia in the East. Chattel slavery lasted in the Middle East until the 20th century.

Slaves were often forcibly castrated by an intermediary before arriving to their Muslim buyers. In the Ottoman Empire eunuch slaves were typically put in charge of guarding sultans harems and even holy sites like Mecca. White Eunuchs were typically put in charge of the other eunuchs with black eunuchs often being charged specifically with looking after the harem. Most slaves in the Arab world were black, helping contribute to a prevalence and normalization of anti-blackness.

== By country ==
=== Australia ===
White converts to Islam may enjoy white privileges that Muslims of color do not enjoy in Australia. White Muslims may be perceived as non-white if they are visibly Muslim, such as by wearing a hijab, but many white privileges would return if the white Muslim were to dress in a less visibly Islamic fashion. A white hijabi may receive less white privilege than a white non-hijabi due to the fact that Muslim identity is often racialized within Australian society.

Non-Black and white Muslims in Australia may use the N-word or other racial slurs, believing that because Australian Muslims are mostly brown and because Islam is a racialized religion, that the words are not offensive coming from Muslims.

According to Australian Muslim journalist Zahra Al-Hilaly, Black Muslims face racism that non-Black Muslims do not experience. She has written that she has racial privilege as a non-Black Arab Muslim and that "White Muslims are often praised and feted, but black Muslims do not receive the same reception, leadership roles or attention in the Muslim community."

=== Canada ===
Muslim Link, an online hub for Canadian Muslims, has posted the Muslim Anti-Racism Collaborative's "Anti-Racism Guide for White Muslims". The Muslim Anti-Racism Collaborative is a US-based racial justice education organization with members in the US and Canada. While white Muslims experience Islamophobia in Canada, they may also benefit from white privilege in ways that Canadian Muslims of color do not experience. Some white Muslims may believe that because they are Muslim they are therefore incapable of being racist. According to Muslim Link's anti-racism guide, white Muslims "have been socialized as white people, with messages from our families, teachers, media and society about whiteness under an umbrella of white supremacy, both subtle and overt. We grew up without the lived experience of racism that People of Color have. This has both shaped and limited our understanding of racism."

=== United Arab Emirates ===
Black Muslim bloggers have criticized the exclusion of Black Muslims from the Dubai-based Modest Fashion Week.

=== Jordan ===
The primary migrant sponsorship program in Jordan and much of the Gulf known as the Kafala system has been characterized as a form of institutional and racialized humiliation. The practice is often characterized as modern-day slavery since workers cannot change jobs and often are treated servants rather than employees. Migrants from Africa and Asia have been used increasingly because of their inability to claim citizenship or have any shared heritage in the country where they work. Migrant workers have recounted to being referred as ‘asuad’ (‘black’) and being told their countries are poor and uncivilized.

=== United Kingdom ===
According to Dr. Amena Amer, a British Muslim lecturer, white British Muslims enjoy white privilege not afforded to non-white Muslims. White British Muslims' "whiteness offers them an opportunity to distance themselves from extremism, a tactic unavailable to non-white Muslims." White British Muslims suspected of involvement in terrorism are sometimes afforded more leniency or understanding than Muslims of South Asian or Middle Eastern heritage.

=== United States ===
Black Muslims in the United States experience the same anti-Black racism that other Black Americans face, as well as the same Islamophobia that other Muslim Americans face. Black Muslims also experience racism within predominantly non-Black Muslim communities. Because Muslims are often racialized as Arab or South Asian in American society, Black Muslims are often erased and made invisible. Black Muslims may experience racial discrimination in predominantly non-Black Arab-American and South Asian-American mosques.

St. Louis, Missouri, has a legacy of anti-Black racism within white Muslim communities. While Bosnian Muslims experience a complicated relationship to whiteness, they are considered white by the US Census and may enjoy white privileges that Black residents of St. Louis may not enjoy. In 2014, a Bosniak-American named Zamir Begic was beaten to death with hammers. The murder caused shock in the Bosnian community of St. Louis and protests were held against violent crime. Because Begic was white and his suspected assailants were Black and Latino, some claimed that the murder of Begic was an example of "black-on-white" crime while others claimed it was a "a targeted attack on Bosnians". While the belief that Begic was targeted due to his ethnicity or race contributed to racial tensions between the Black community and white Muslims of Bosnian descent, St. Louis police did not believe the attack had any ethnic or racial basis.

According to the novelist Laila Lalami, there is a significant legal distinction for American Muslims depending on their race, noting the difference between African-American Muslim descendants of enslaved people and Syro-Lebanese Muslim settlers who gained Indigenous land in North Dakota and founded the first mosque in the United States. She notes that Syrian, Lebanese, Palestinian, and other Arab people acquired a legal classification as "free white persons" under court interpretations of the Naturalization Act of 1790. The whiteness of Arab Muslims was contested in the early 1900s, but Muslims were eventually classified as white. A court case in 1942 in Michigan, In Re Ahmed Hassan, ruled that Arab Muslims could not be classified as white. The judge ruled that a Muslim immigrant from Yemen was "undisputably dark brown in color" despite not being "Asiatic" and that "Arabs as a class are not white and therefore not eligible for citizenship." However, less than 2 years later in 1944 a Massachusetts court ruled in Ex Parte Mohriez that a Muslim immigrant from what is now Saudi Arabia was white, with the judge noting that this was the general practice of the United States Immigration and Naturalization Service at the time.

== See also ==
- Antisemitism in Islam
- History of the Jews under Muslim rule
- History of slavery in the Muslim world
- Islamic views on slavery
- Racism in Jewish communities
- Slavery and religion
- Slavery in Africa
- Slavery in Asia
- Xenophobia and racism in the Middle East

== Sources ==
- Mishin, Dmitrij (1998). The Saqaliba slaves in the Aghlabid state (PDF). Budapest: Central European University.
