= European emigration =

Spread of people with European heritage

European emigration is the successive emigration waves from the European continent to other continents. The origins of the various European diasporas can be traced to the people who left the European nation states or stateless ethnic communities on the European continent. From 1500 to the mid-20th century, 60–65 million people left Europe, of which less than 9% went to tropical areas (the Caribbean, Africa and Asia ).

From 1815 to 1933, 65 million people left Europe, primarily to the Americas, with the largest numbers going to the United States, Canada, Cuba, Brazil, Argentina, Chile and Uruguay, while others went to Australia, New Zealand, South Africa, and Siberia. These populations also multiplied rapidly in their new habitat; much more so than the populations of Africa and Asia. As a result, on the eve of World War I, 38% of the world's total population was of European ancestry. Most European emigrants to the Americas came from Italy, Germany, France, Ireland, United Kingdom, Portugal, Spain, Poland, Greece, Hungary, Netherlands, Austria, Norway, Sweden, Denmark, Armenia, Lithuania, Russia, and Ukraine.

More contemporary, European emigration can also refer to emigration from one European country to another, especially in the context of the internal mobility in the European Union (intra-EU mobility) or mobility within the Eurasian Union.

== History ==
=== 8th - early 5th century BC: Greek settlement ===
In Archaic Greece, trading and colonizing activities of the Greek tribes from the Black Sea, Southern Italy (the so-called "Magna Graecia") and Asia Minor propagated Greek culture, religion and language around the Mediterranean and Black Sea basins. Greek city-states were established in Southern Europe, northern Libya and the Black Sea coast, and the Greeks founded over 400 colonies in these areas. Alexander the Great's conquest of the Achaemenid Empire marked the beginning of the Hellenistic period, which was characterized by a new wave of Greek colonization in Asia and Africa; the Greek ruling classes established their presence in Egypt, southwest Asia, and Northwest India. Many Greeks migrated to the new Hellenistic cities founded in Alexander's wake, as geographically dispersed as Uzbekistan and Kuwait.

=== 1450-1800: Immigration to the Americas ===
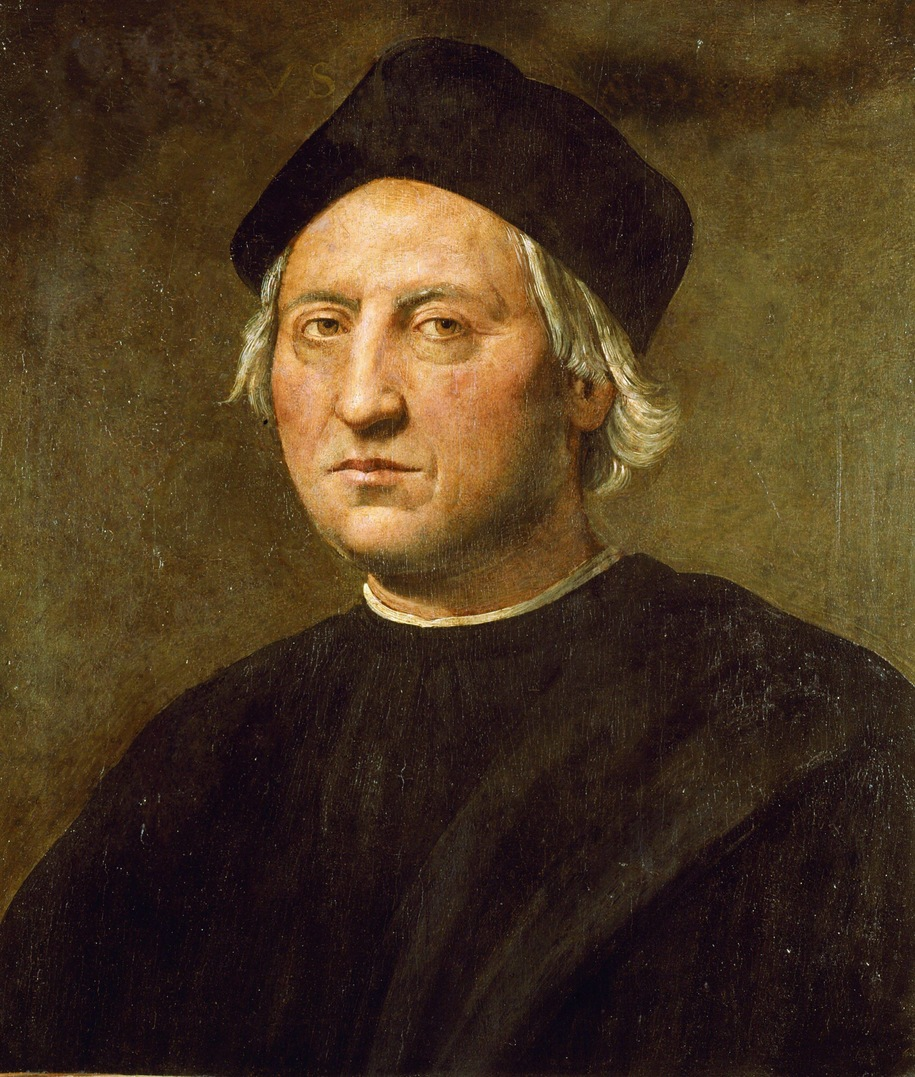
The voyages of Christopher Columbus, starting in 1492, coincided with the first wave of European colonization and began sustained contact between the Eastern and Western Hemispheres.

The European continent has been a central part of a complex migration system, which included swaths of North Africa, the Middle East and Asia Minor well before the modern era. Yet, only the population growth of the late Middle Ages allowed for larger population movements, inside and outside of the continent. The European exploration of the Americas stimulated a steady stream of voluntary migration from Europe.

Roughly one and a half million Europeans settled in the New World during the period of 1500 and 1800.

==== Spanish and Portuguese ====
About 200,000 Spaniards settled in their American provinces prior to 1600, a small settlement compared to the 3 to 4 million Amerindians who lived in Spanish territory in the Americas.

During the 1500s, Spain and Portugal sent a steady flow of government and church officials, members of the lesser nobility, people from the working classes and their families averaging roughly three-thousand people per year from a population of around eight million. A total of around 437,000 left Spain in the 150-year period from 1500 to 1650 mainly to New Spain, Peru in South America, and the Caribbean Islands. It has been estimated that over 1.86 million Spaniards immigrated to the Americas in the period between 1492 and 1824, one million in the 18th century (during this century, emigration was encouraged by the new Bourbon dynasty in Spain), with millions more continuing to immigrate following independence.

Between 1500 and 1700, 100,000 Portuguese crossed the Atlantic to settle in Brazil. However, with the discovery of numerous highly productive gold mines in the Minas Gerais region, the Portuguese immigration to Brazil increased by fivefold. From 1500, when the Portuguese reached Brazil, until its independence in 1822, from 500,000 to 700,000 Portuguese settled in Brazil, with 600,000 in the 1700s. Though not usually studied, this represented one of the largest movements of European populations to their colonies to the Americas during the colonial times. According to historian Leslie Bethell, "In 1700 Portugal had a population of about two million people." During the 18th century hundreds of thousands left for the Portuguese Colony of Brazil, despite efforts by the crown to place severe restrictions on emigration.

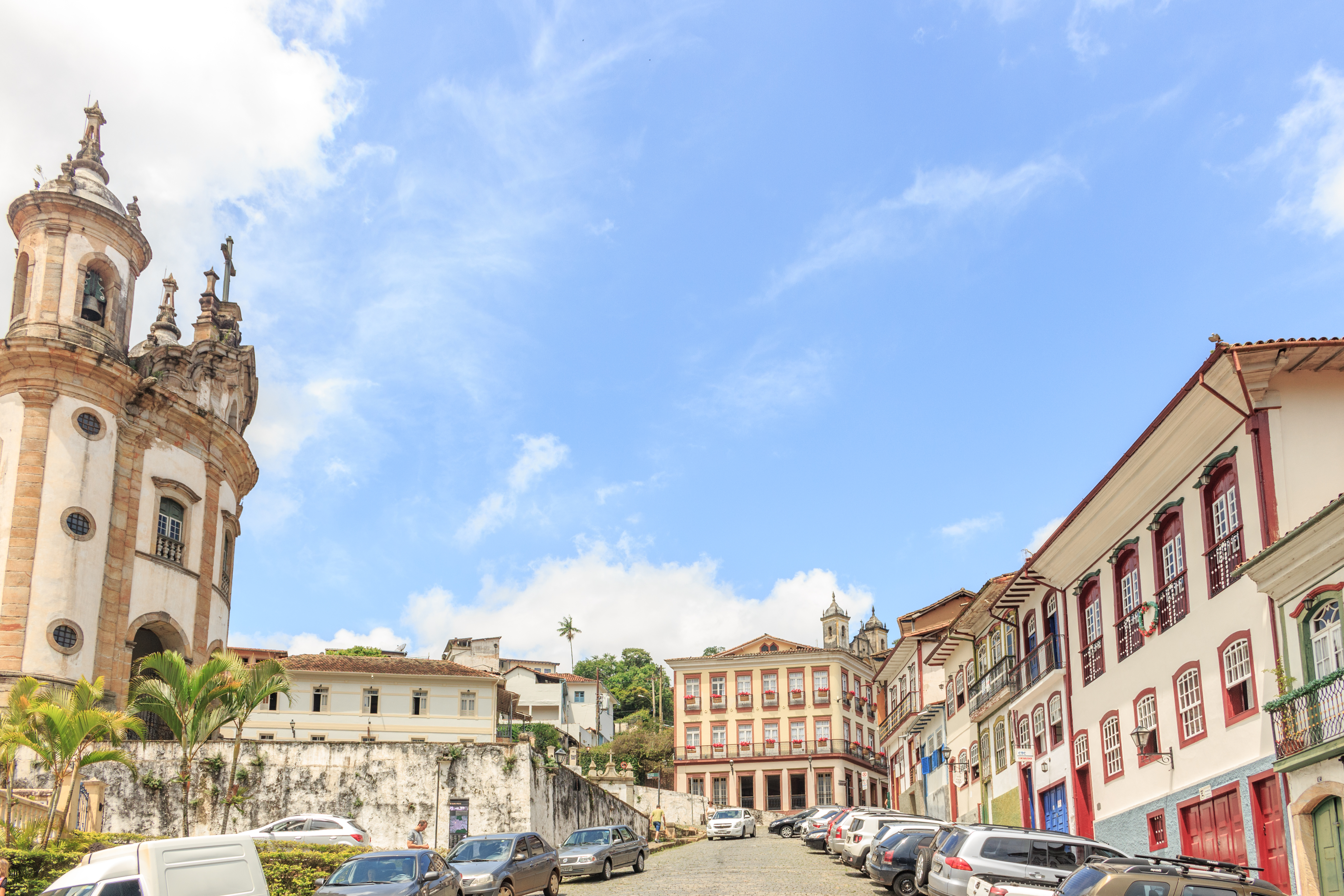
Ouro Preto, an 18th-century colonial city of large Portuguese settlement

In the 18th century, thanks to the gold rush, the capital of the province of Minas Gerais, the town of Vila Rica (today, Ouro Preto) became for a time one of the most populous cities in the New World. This massive influx of Portuguese immigration and influence created a city which remains to this day, one of the best examples of 18th century European architecture in the Americas. The 2022 Brazilian census showed that 41.1% of Minas Gerais state identified as white Brazilian of European descent with the rest possibly having mixed Portuguese origins. However, the development of the mining economy in the 18th century raised wages and employment opportunities in the Portuguese colony and emigration increased: in the 18th century alone, about 600,000 Portuguese settled in Brazil.

==== British, Irish and German settlement in North America ====
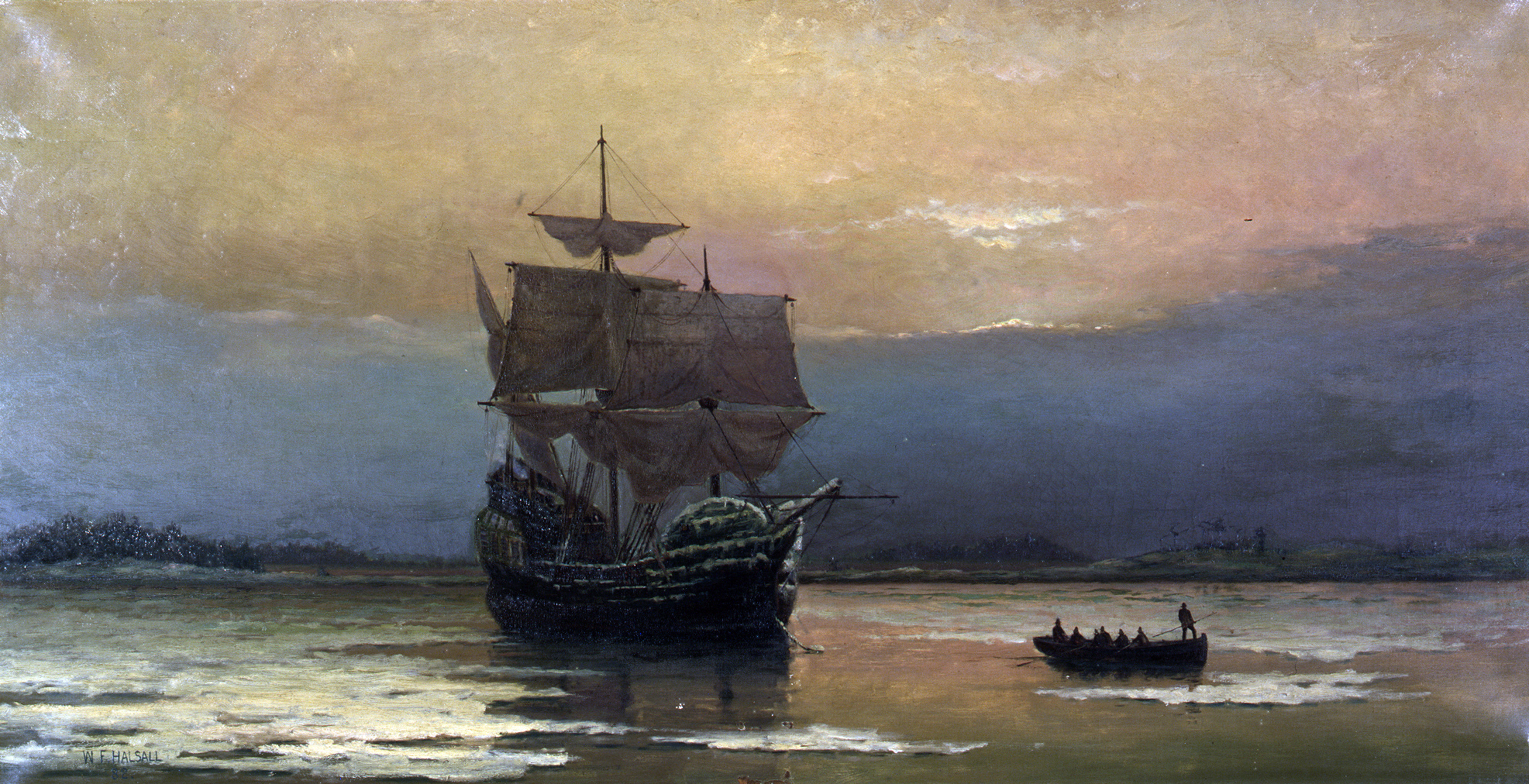
Mayflower bringing one of the first groups of English settlers to North America

Between one-half and two-thirds of European immigrants to the Thirteen Colonies between the 1630s and the American Revolution came under indentures. The practice was sufficiently common that the Habeas Corpus Act 1679, in part, prevented imprisonments overseas; it also made provisions for those with existing transportation contracts and those "praying to be transported" in lieu of remaining in prison upon conviction. In any case, while half the European immigrants to the Thirteen Colonies had been indentured servants, at any one time they were outnumbered by workers who had never been indentured, or whose indenture had expired. Free wage labor was more common for Europeans in the colonies.

Indentured persons were numerically important, mostly in the region from Virginia north to New Jersey. Other colonies saw far fewer of them. The total number of European immigrants to all 13 colonies before 1775 was about 500,000–550,000; of these, 55,000 were involuntary prisoners. Of the 450,000 or so European arrivals who came voluntarily, Tomlins estimates that 48% were indentured. About 75% were under the age of 25. The age of legal adulthood for men was 24 years; those over 24 generally came on contracts lasting about 3 years. Regarding the children who came, Gary Nash reports that, "many of the servants were actually nephews, nieces, cousins and children of friends of emigrating Englishmen, who paid their passage in return for their labour once in America."

Figures for emigration in the Spanish Empire in 1650–1800 and in Brazil in 1700–1800 are not given in the table. Of the 322,000 from Britain, 190,000–250,000 were Scottish and Irish.

Numbers of European Emigrants 1500–1783
Country of origin	Number	Period
Britain and Ireland	722,000	1607–1780
Portugal	100,000	1500–1700
Portugal	500,000	1700–1760
Spain	437,000	1500–1650
German-speaking Europe	100,000	1683–1783
France	51,000	1608–1760
Totals	1,410,000	1500–1783

In North America, immigration was dominated by British, German, Irish and other Northern Europeans. Immigration to New France laid the origins of modern Canada, with important early emigration of colonists from Northern France.

From 1760 to 1820, the final phase of colonial immigration became dominated by free settlers and was marked by a huge increase in British immigrants to North America and the United States in particular. In that period, 871,000 Europeans immigrated to the Americas, of which over 70% were British (including Irish in that category). Many independent farmers and tenants emigrated to establish farms and plantations, as well as craftsmen.

=== 19th century to 20th century ===
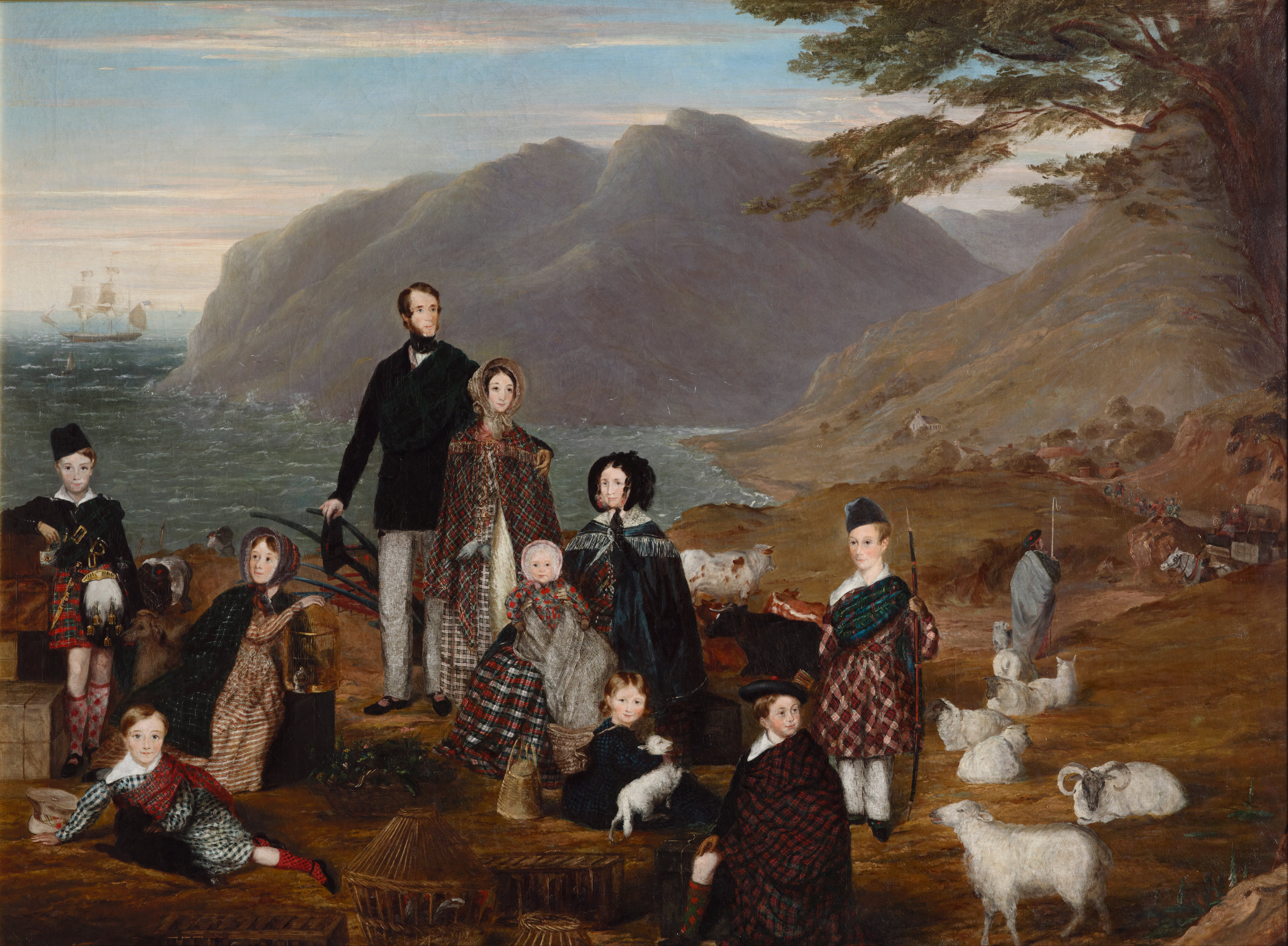
Scottish Highland family migrating to New Zealand by William Allsworth

There was mass European immigration to the Americas, Australia, New Zealand, and South Africa in the 19th and 20th centuries, as a result of a dramatic demographic transition in 19th-century Europe, subsequent wars and political changes on the continent. From the end of the Napoleonic Wars in 1815 to the end of World War I in 1918, millions of Europeans emigrated. Of these, 71% went to North America, 21% to Central and South America and 7% to Australia. About 11 million of these people went to Latin America, of whom 38% were Italians, 28% were Spaniards and 11% were Portuguese.

European emigrants 1800–1960
Destination	Percent
United States	70.0%
Latin America	12.0%
Russian Siberia	9.0%
Canada, Australia, New Zealand, South Africa	9.0%
Total	100.0%

==== Immigration to Brazil ====
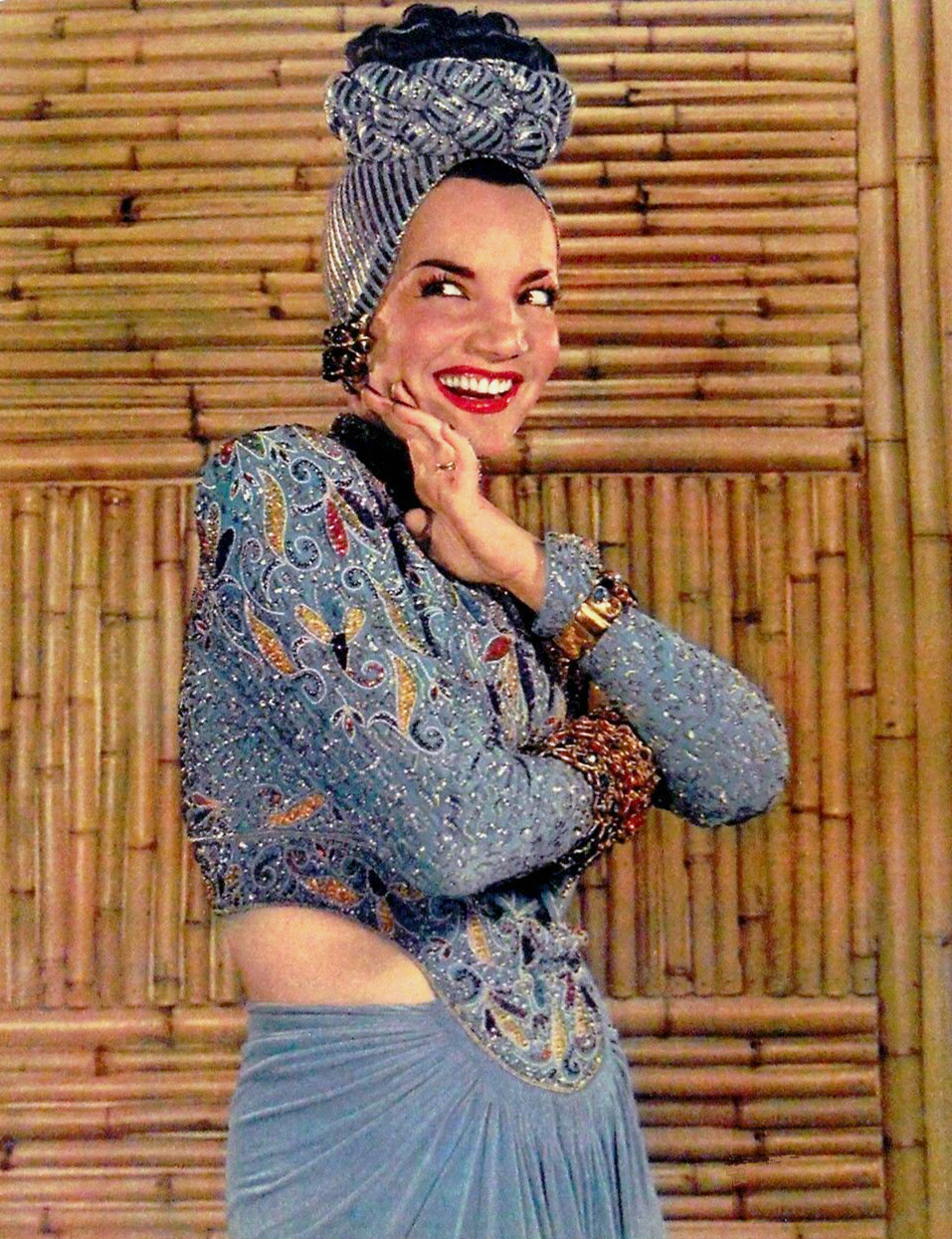
Portuguese-born singer Carmen Miranda was nicknamed "The Brazilian Bombshell".

In Brazil, the proportion of immigrants in the national population was much smaller. Immigrants tended to be concentrated in the central and southern parts of the country. The proportion of foreigners in Brazil peaked in 1920, at just 7 percent or 2 million people, mostly Portuguese and Italians. However, the influx of 4 million European immigrants between 1870 and 1920 significantly altered the racial composition of the country. From 1901 to 1920, immigration was responsible for only 7 percent of Brazilian population growth, but in the years of high immigration, from 1891 to 1900, the share was as high as 30 percent (higher than Argentina's 26 percent in the 1880s).

==== Country of arrivals ====
The countries in the Americas that received a major wave of European immigrants from 1820s to the early 1930s were: the United States (32.5 million), Argentina (6.5 million), Canada (5 million), Brazil (4.5 million), Cuba (1.4 million), Chile (728,000), Uruguay (713,000).

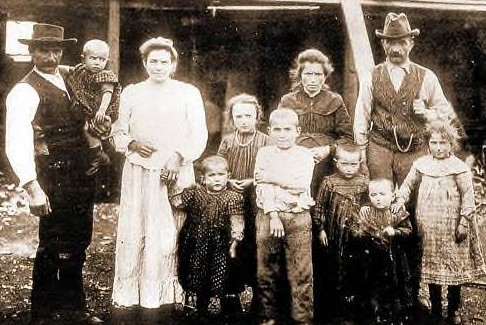
Italian emigrants to Capitan Pastene (Chile) in 1910: the Castagnoli family

Other countries that received a more modest immigration flow (accounting for less than 10 percent of total European immigration to Latin America) were: Mexico (326,000), Colombia (126,000), Puerto Rico (62,000), Peru (30,000), and Paraguay (21,000).

Destination	Years	Arrivals	Ref(s)
United States	1821–1932	32,244,000	
Argentina	1856–1932	6,405,000	
Canada	1831–1932	5,206,000	
Brazil	1818–1932	4,431,000	
Australia	1821–1932	2,913,000	
Cuba	1901–1931	857,000	
South Africa	1881–1932	852,000	
Chile	1882–1932	726,000	
Uruguay	1836–1932	713,000	
New Zealand	1821–1932	594,000	
Mexico	1901–1931	326,000	

== Legacy ==
=== Distribution ===
Map of Greek territories and colonies during the Archaic period (800–480 BC)

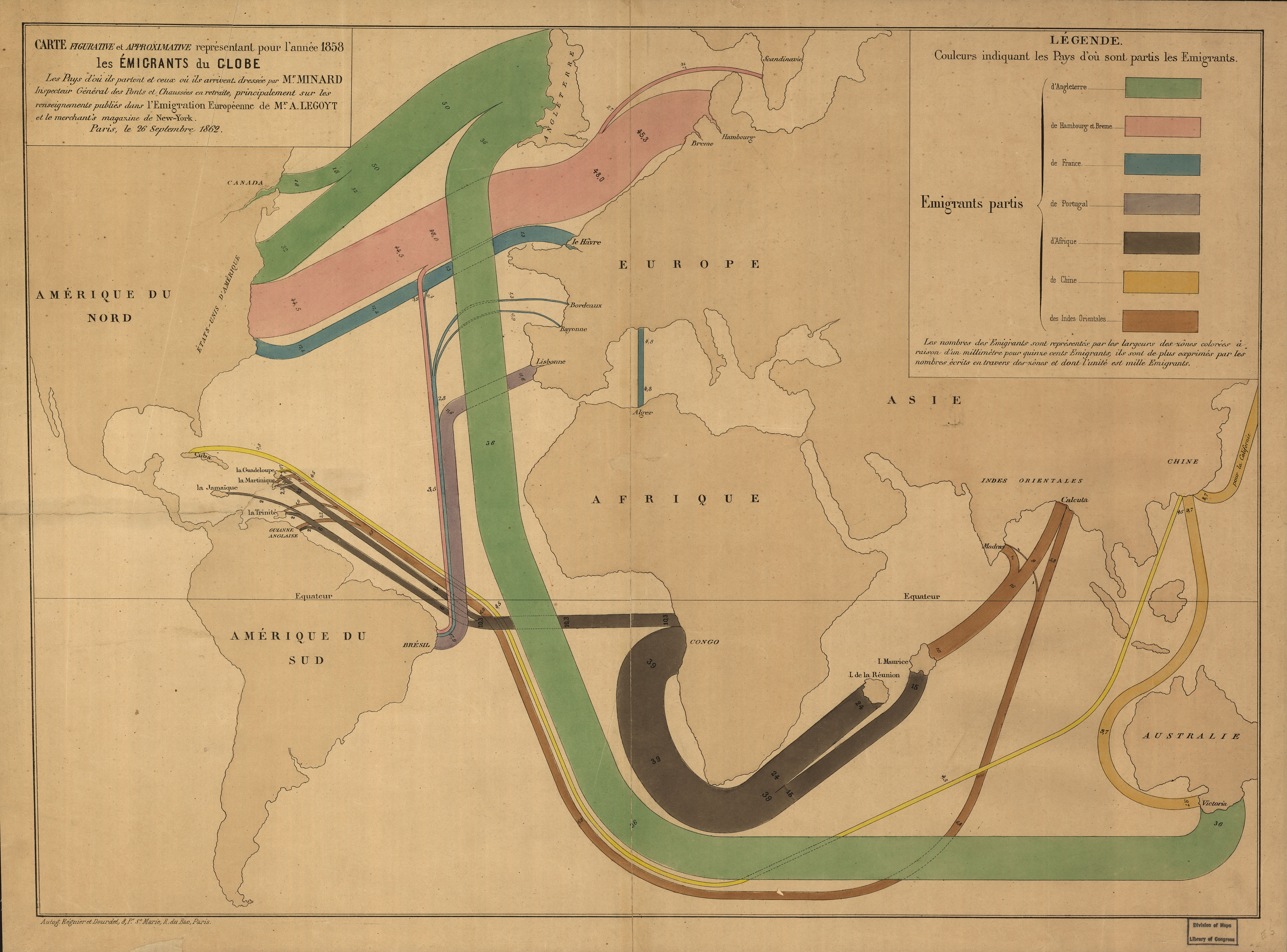
Global emigration map for 1858, by CJ Minard, Paris, 1862

After the Age of Discovery, different ethnic European communities began to emigrate out of Europe with particular concentrations in Australia, New Zealand, the United States, Canada, Argentina, Uruguay, Colombia, Venezuela, Cuba, Costa Rica, Brazil, Chile, and Puerto Rico where they came to constitute a European-descended majority population. These statistics rely on identification with a European ethnic group in censuses, and as such are subjective (especially in the case of mixed origins). Nations and regions outside Europe with significant populations:

==== Canada ====
In the first Canadian census in 1871, 98.5% chose a European origin with it slightly decreasing to 96.3% declared in 1971. In the 2016 census, 19,683,320 self-identified with a European ethnic origin, the largest being of British Isles origins (11,211,850). Individually, they are English (6,320,085), Scottish (4,799,005), French (4,680,820), Irish (4,627,000), German (3,322,405), Italian (1,587,965). As of the 2021 Census, 67.4% of Canadians self-identify as white.

==== United States ====
As of the 2020 census, 61.6% of Americans identify as white alone. The 2020 United States census data revealed that English Americans 46.5 million (19.8%), German Americans 45m (19.1%), Irish Americans 38.6m (16.4%) and Italian Americans 16.8m (7.1%) were the four largest self-reported European ancestry groups at 62.4% of the white alone or in combination population, reflecting the early settlement. At the time of the first U.S. census in 1790, 80.7% of the American people self-identified as White, where it remained above that level, even reaching as high as 90% prior to the passage of the Immigration and Nationality Act of 1965. However, numerically it increased from 3.17 million (1790) to 199.6 million (1990) two hundred years later.

==== Mexico ====
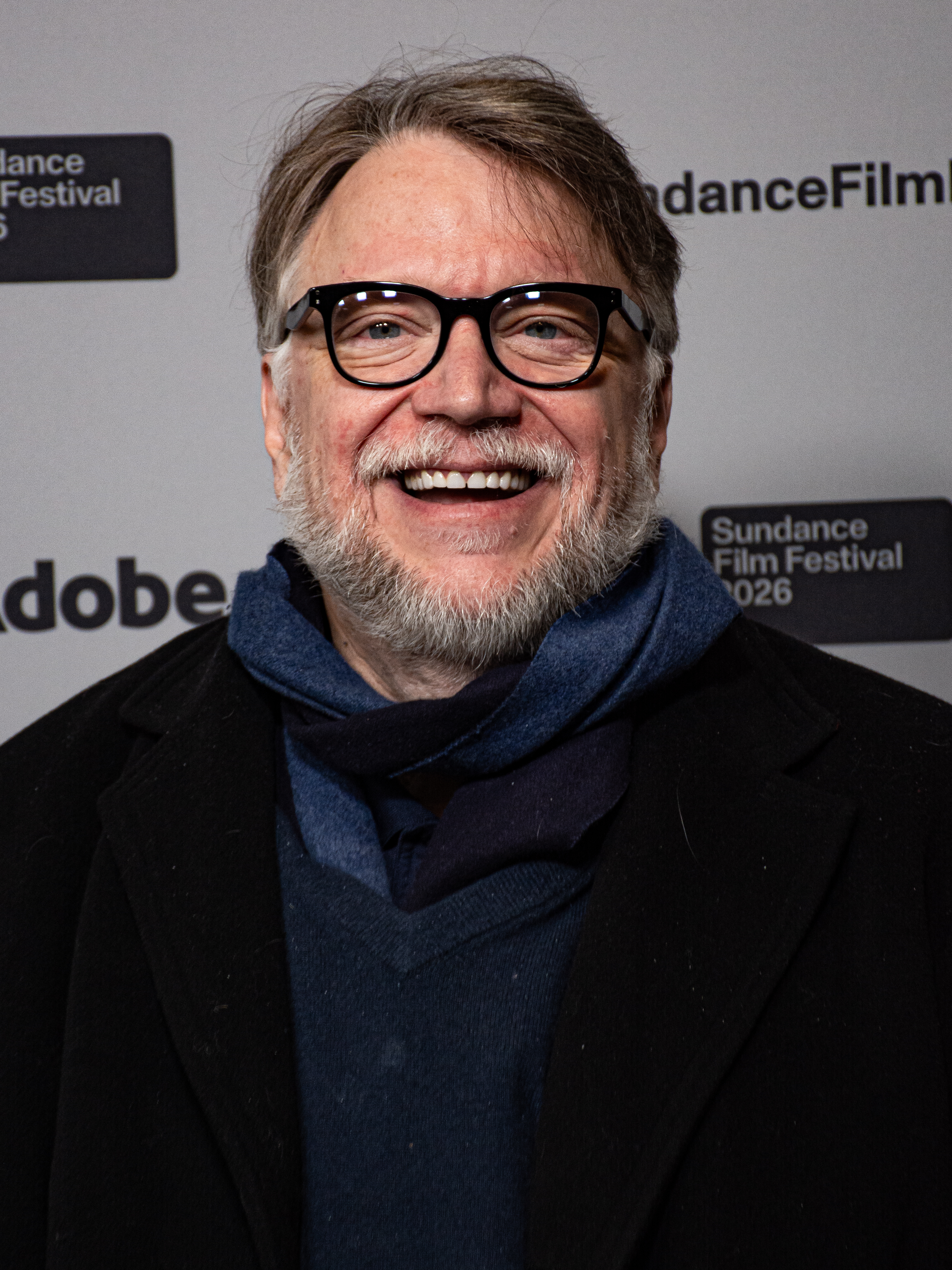
Mexican filmmaker Guillermo del Toro is a Mexican of European descent.

Mexico is a multi-ethnic country where a large majority of the population have at least some European ancestry. Britannica estimates that around three-fifths are Mestizo, which includes people with mixed European and Amerindian ancestry, while White Mexicans are the largest part of the remainder. Skin color palettes have been used as a primary criteria to estimate the ethnoracial groups within Latin America. A summary published by the Latin American Public Opinion Project has described this as more accurate than self-identification particularly, where the different discourses that exist in regards to national identity have rendered previous attempts to estimate ethnic groups unreliable. If the criterion used is the presence of blond hair, it is 18% - 23%.

==== Caribbean and Central America ====
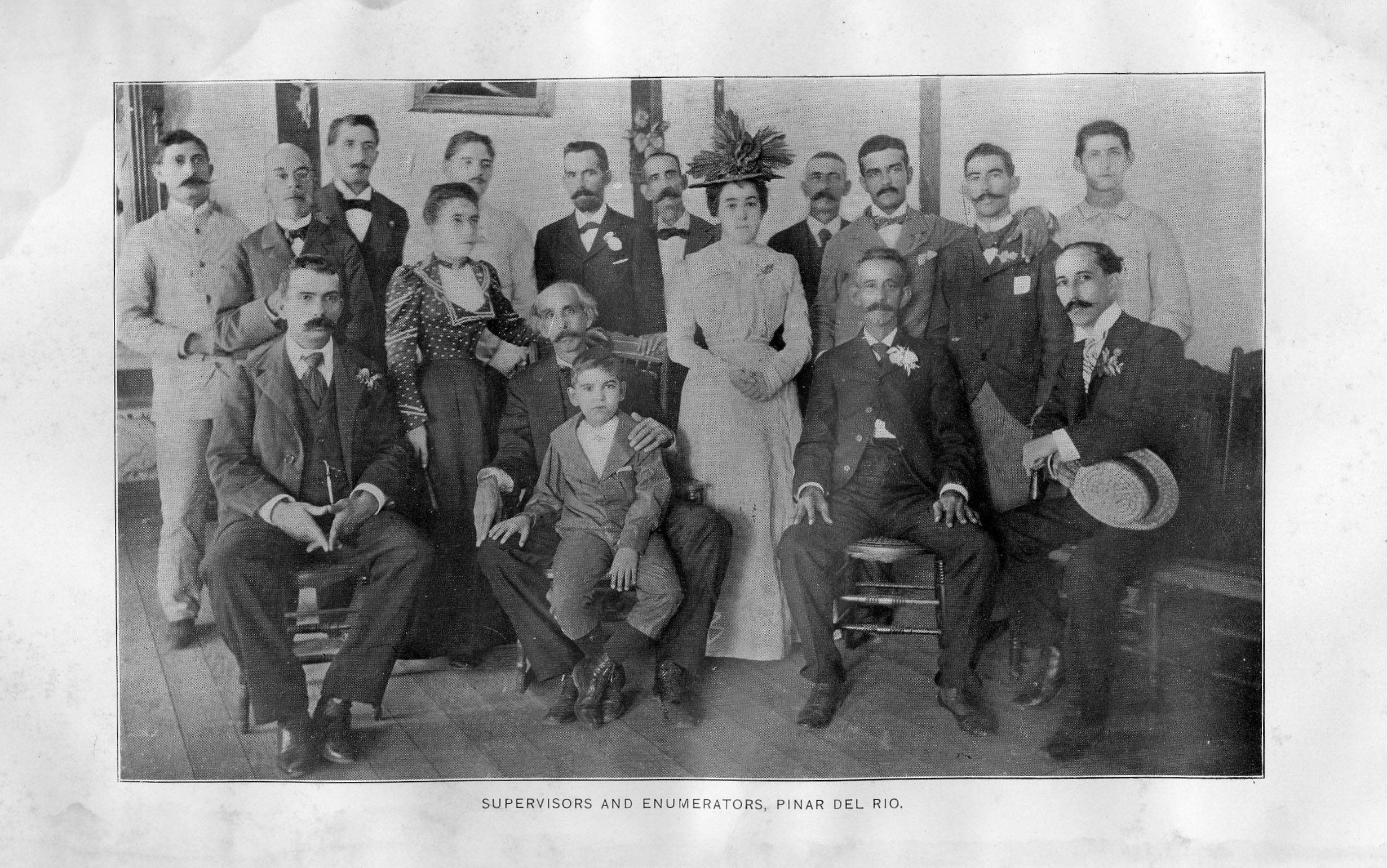
Cuban enumerators in Pinar del Rio, 1899

According to the 2012 census, white Cubans make up 64.1% or 7,160,399 of the population. Cubans of European origin (predominantly Spanish) reached its highest proportion during the early to mid twentieth century. In 1943, the census showed 74.3% or 3,553,312 were white.

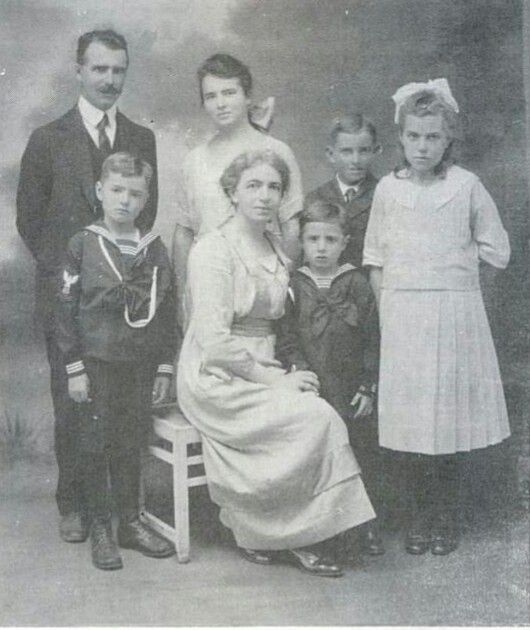
Germans in Costa Rica

In Costa Rica 83.7% of the population is White and Mestizo. Other sources estimate different results between whites and mestizos. The White population is around 60-65%. Most are of Spanish and Italian descent, however there are also German, Polish and French communities. During the last half of the 19th century and the first half of the 20th century, it welcomed more than 30,000 Europeans. Costa Rica had the greatest European migratory impact in Central America. When Costa Rica became independent, the population was barely 60,000 inhabitants.

The 2022 Dominican census showed 1,611,752 people or 18.7% of those 12 years old as white, 731,855 males and 879,897 females.

In El Salvador 12.7% of the population identifies as "white", and 86.3% of the population were mestizo or people of mixed European and Amerindian ancestry. The majority being Spanish descendants from Galicia and Asturias. In El Salvador, settlement peaked between 1920 and 1930, when 8,152 European and Arab immigrants entered the country, the Europeans being mostly Italians, Spanish and Germans.

In Guatemala, 5% of the population is of European descent, primarily of either Spanish and German origins. Many German, Italian and Spanish Families arrived in Guatemala, the Germans for their part were the largest group, Immigration had a massive character.

==== South America ====
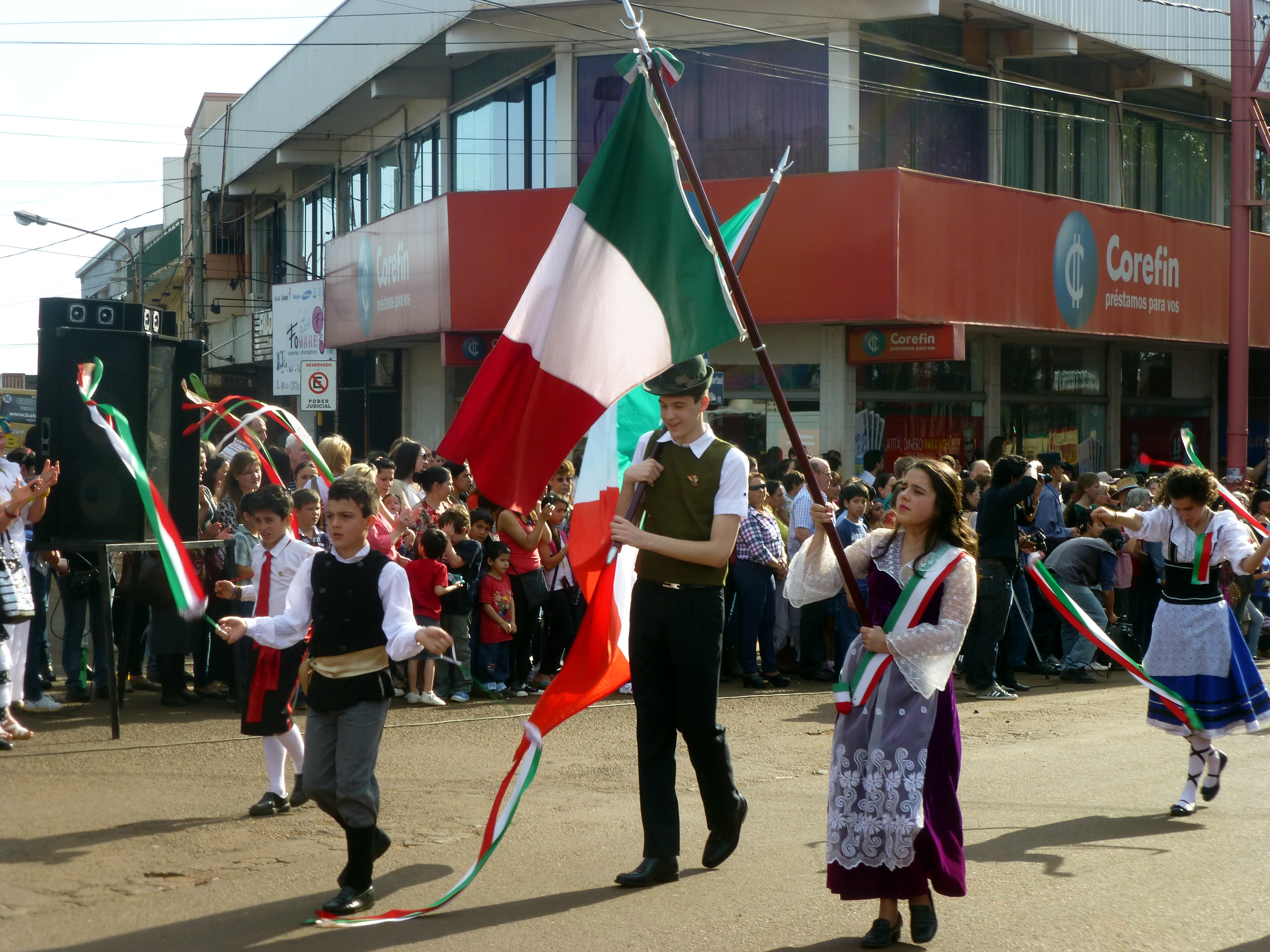
Italian Argentines during the opening parade of the XXXIV Immigrant's Festival in Oberá, Misiones. An estimated 62.5% of Argentina's population has Italian ancestry.

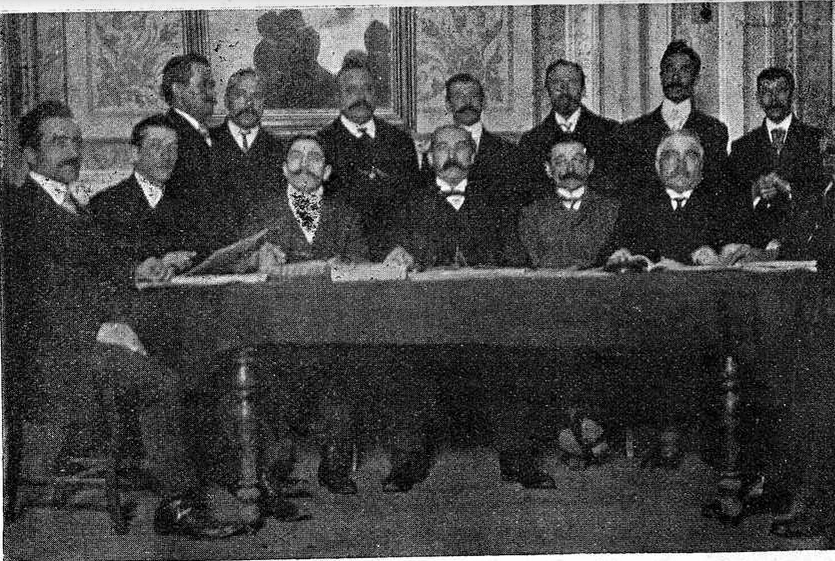
Galician immigrants in Uruguay, 1909

Uruguay and Argentina are the South American countries with the highest proportion of European ancestry, both estimated to exceed 85%. The most significant immigrant groups came from Italy and Spain, followed by France, Germany and Switzerland. These European immigrants played a fundamental role in shaping the cultural fabric and societal development of both nations.

In Brazil, according to the 2022 census, 88.8% (180 million) of Brazilians are of full or partial European descent with 43.46% or 88 million self-identifying as White of European descent. 45.34% (92 million) are descendants of Europeans mixed with Africans or indigenous people and declare themselves as Pardo.

In Venezuela, according to the 2011 National Population and Housing Census, 43.6% of the population identified themselves as white people. After 1935, the country underwent a period of economic and social advancement with the discovery of oil, positioning itself as an attractive destination for immigrants. From 1940 to 1961, an estimated 900,000 European immigrants arrived in Venezuela, following the Second World War, the Francoist dictatorship and the policies of the governments of the Warsaw Pact.

The Falkland Islanders are mainly of European descent, especially British, and can trace their heritage back 9 generations or 200 years. In 2016, the census showed that 42.9 percent were native born and 27.4 percent were born in the U.K. (the second largest birthplace) for a total of more than 70 percent. The Falkland Islands were entirely unoccupied and were first claimed by Britain in 1765. Settlers largely from the United Kingdom, especially Scotland and Wales arrived after the 1830s. The total population of then islands grew from a 287 estimate in 1851 to 3,200 in the most recent 2016 census. The Falkland Islanders historically had a Gaucho presence.

==== Australia and New Zealand ====
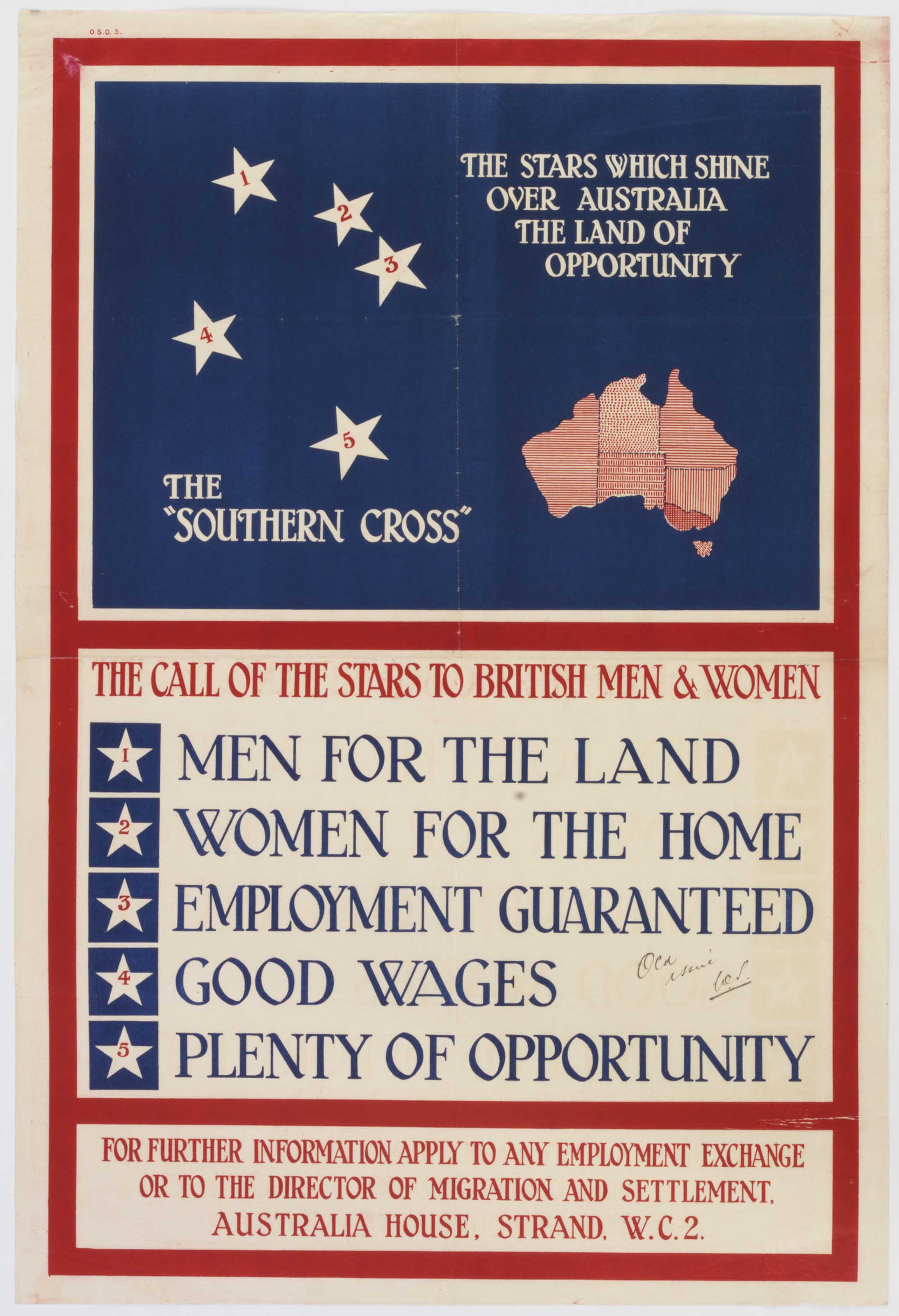
Australian Government poster issued by the Overseas Settlement Office to attract British immigrants (1928)

Using data from the 2016 census, it was estimated that around 58% of the Australian population were Anglo-Celtic Australians with 18% being of other European origins, a total of 76% for European ancestries as a whole. As of 2016, the majority of Australians of European descent are of English (36.1%), Irish (11.0%), Scottish (9.3%), Italian (4.6%), German (4.5%), Greek (1.8%) and Dutch (1.6%) ancestries. A large proportion —33.5%— chose to identify as 'Australian', however the census Bureau has stated that most of these are of old Anglo-Celtic colonial stock.

Europeans historically (especially Anglo-Celtic) and presently are still the largest ethnic group in New Zealand. Their proportion of the total New Zealand population has been decreasing gradually since the 1916 census where they formed 95.1 percent. The 2018 official census had over 3 million people or 71.76% of the population were ethnic Europeans, with 64.1% choosing the New Zealand European option alone.

=== Asia ===
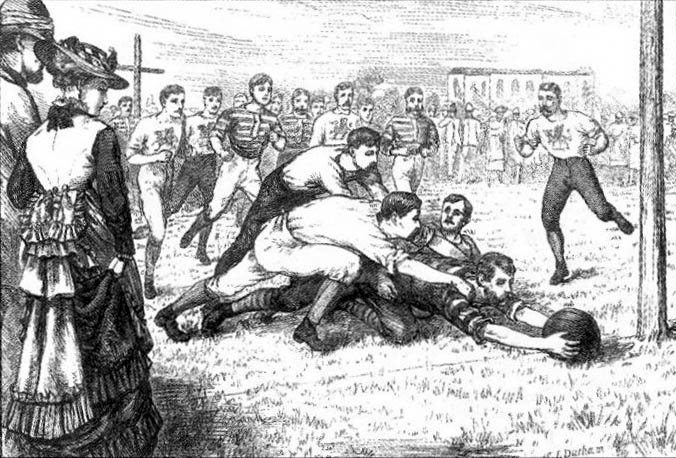
An 1875 painting of rugby being played by Europeans in Calcutta (today Kolkata)

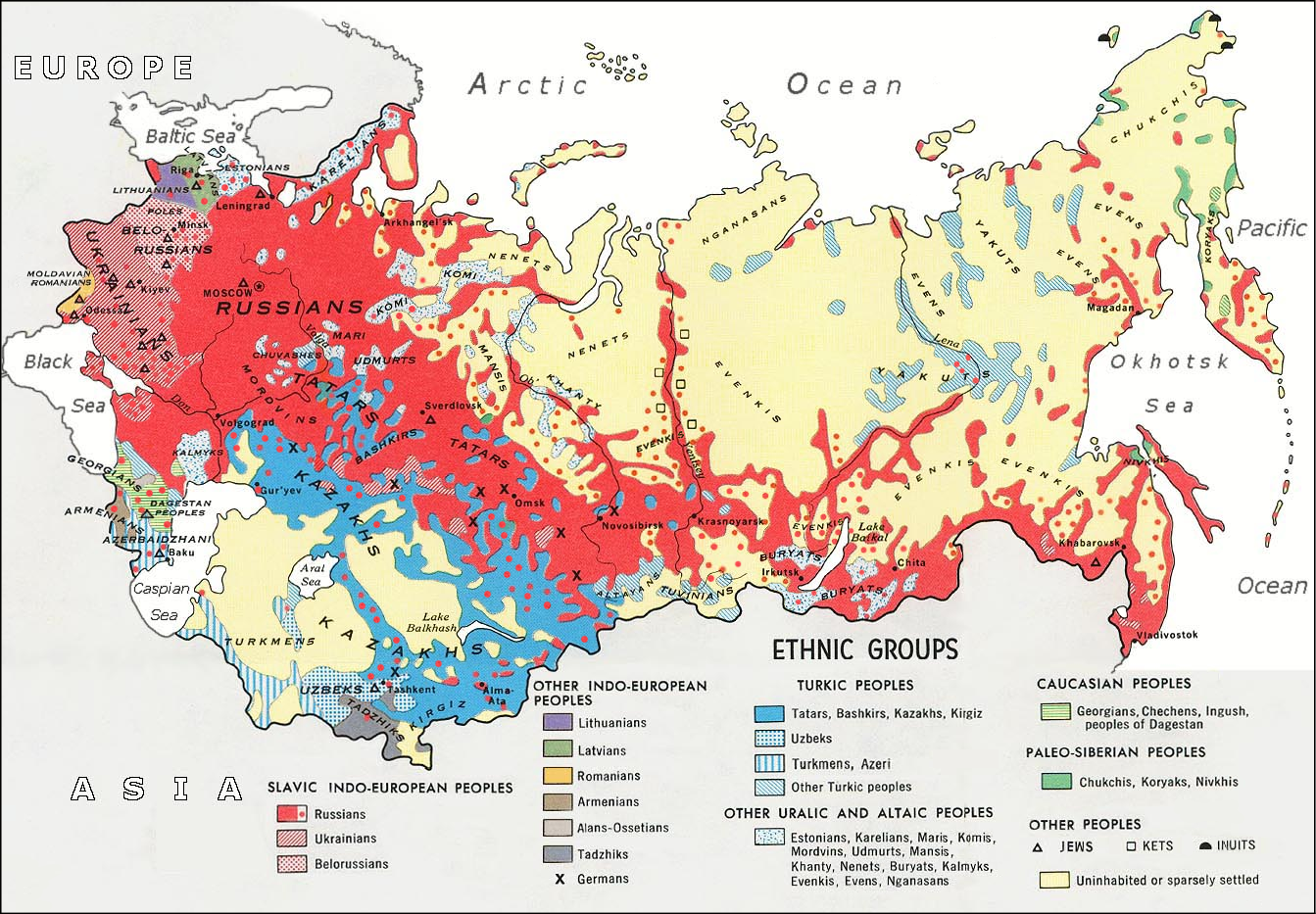
Ethnographic map of the Soviet Union, 1970. Large numbers of East Slavs migrated to Siberia and Central Asia.

In Asia, European-derived populations (specifically Russians), predominate in North Asia and some parts of northern Kazakhstan. They are also a significant minority in Kyrgyzstan, predominantly in the northern part of the country (Chüy Region, Bishkek and the Issyk-Kul Region), where they constitute approximately 1/5 of the population. In Japan and China, there's a sizeable community of ethnic Russians as well, which are Russians in Japan and Russians in China.

Approximately 5–7 million Muslim migrants from the Balkans (from Bulgaria 1.15 million-1.5 million; Greece 1.2 million; Romania, 400,000; Former Yugoslavia, 800,000), Russia (500,000), the Caucasus (900,000 of whom 2/3 remained the rest going to Syria, Jordan and Cyprus) and Syria (500,000 mostly as a result of the Syrian Civil War) arrived in Ottoman Anatolia and modern Turkey from 1783 to 2016 of whom 4 million came by 1924, 1.3 million came post-1934 to 1945 and more than 1.2 million before the outbreak of the Syrian Civil War. Today, between a third and a quarter of Turkey's population of almost 80 million have ancestry from these Muhacirs.

==== Philippines ====
In the Philippines, a genetic study by the National Geographic, shows that about 5% of the ancestry of Filipinos comes from Southern Europe (mostly Spanish Filipinos) that had arrived during the Spanish colonisation of the archipelago, with the census data exactly corroborating this statistic. Meanwhile, 2.33% of the population also descend from Mexicans, and Mexicans have diverse ancestries which includes: European Mexicans, Native American Mexicans, and Mestizo Mexicans. Additionally, an estimated 250,000 Filipino Amerasians descend from American servicemen stationed in the country. Furthermore, as of the year 2025, a recorded 750,000 American citizens (of mostly European ancestry) live in the Philippines. Combined, the American and Amerasian minority form 1% of the Philippines' population.

== Populations of European descent ==
- Albanian diaspora
  - Kosovar diaspora
- Armenian diaspora
- Azerbaijani diaspora
- Ashkenazi diaspora
- Austrian diaspora
- Belarusian diaspora
- Belgian diaspora
  - Flemish diaspora
  - Walloon diaspora
- Bosnian diaspora
- British diaspora
  - Cornish diaspora
  - English diaspora
  - Manx diaspora
  - Scottish diaspora
  - Welsh diaspora
- Bulgarian diaspora
- Croatian diaspora
- Czech diaspora
- Danish diaspora
- Dutch diaspora
- Estonian diaspora
- Finnish diaspora
- French diaspora
  - Breton diaspora
  - Corsican diaspora
  - Quebec diaspora
- Georgian diaspora
- German diaspora
- Greek diaspora
  - Greek Cypriot diaspora
- Hungarian diaspora
- Icelandic diaspora
- Irish diaspora
- Italian diaspora
  - Calabrian diaspora
  - Istrian–Dalmatian diaspora
  - Niçard diaspora
- Latvian diaspora
- Lithuanian diaspora
- Maltese diaspora
- Macedonian diaspora
- Montenegrin diaspora
- North Caucasian diaspora
  - Chechen diaspora
  - Circassian diaspora
- Norwegian diaspora
- Polish diaspora
  - Kashubian diaspora
- Portuguese diaspora
- Romani diaspora
- Romanian diaspora
  - Moldovan diaspora
- Russian diaspora
- Serb diaspora
- Slovak diaspora
- Slovene diaspora
- Spanish diaspora
  - Asturian diaspora
  - Basque diaspora
  - Canarian diaspora
  - Catalan diaspora
  - Galician diaspora
  - Sephardic diaspora
- Swedish diaspora
- Swiss diaspora
- Ukrainian diaspora
  - Crimean Tatar diaspora
  - Ruthenian/Rusyn diaspora

== See also ==
- Emigration from Africa
- History of colonialism
- Immigration to the Western world
  - Immigration to Europe
- Indigenous people
- Western world
- Western culture
- White people
- White Americans
- European Americans
- American diaspora
- European Brazilians
- European Mexicans
- European Argentines
- White Argentines
- European Canadians
- European Australians
- European New Zealanders
- European Colombians
- European Venezuelans
