= Britons in Bangladesh =

Ethnic group

The British diaspora in Bangladesh has historically played a significant role due to the impacts of British colonialism.

== History ==
=== Pre-colonial era ===
Britons first started emigrating to Bengal in what is now Bangladesh in the 17th century. The vast majority of emigrants from Britain were affiliated with the East India Company (EIC), an English chartered company formed in 1600 to trade with the East Indies. However, prior to the mid-18th century, the British community in Bengal was very small; prior to 1757, there were likely less than 200 Britons in the entire region. Some were EIC employees who worked in the Company's factories in Bengal, while others lived in Calcutta. During the early 18th century, EIC employees were known for engaging in brawls and using foul language. Though this attracted negative comments from Bengalis, Britons residing in Bengal in turn viewed local rulers as despotic and corrupt.

=== Colonial era ===
One writer claimed that in the first decades after 1757, the British community in Bengal transformed from "pettifogging traders quarreling over their seats in church... into imperialist swashbucklers and large scale extortionists" as a result of the EIC's rapid conquest of the region From the mid-18th century onwards, an increasing number of British women emigrated to Bengal, which had the effect of reducing relationships between British men and local women.

=== Contemporary era ===
There have been concerns around Islamism being imported into Bangladesh through the return migration of British Bangladeshis.

== See also ==
- Bangladesh–United Kingdom relations
- British diaspora
- Immigration to Bangladesh
- Bangladeshis in the United Kingdom
