= Bangladeshi Indian =

Bangladeshi-Indian or Indian-Bangladeshi may refer to:

- Bangladesh–India relations
- Bangladeshis in India
- Indians in Bangladesh

== See also ==
- Bengali people
