= Muslim diaspora =

Diaspora from the Muslim world

A world map showing the percentage of Muslims in each country. The diaspora (in non-dark green regions) is most notably visible in the West.

The Muslim diaspora is the diasporic group of Muslims whose ancestors emigrated from the long-standing regions of the Muslim world and the national homes of the Muslim peoples, including Asia, the Palestinian regions, and others, although mainly comprise the Middle East and North Africa along with parts of South and Southeast Asia.

== History ==
African Muslim slaves were brought to the Americas during the Atlantic slave trade. From the 19th century onwards, Muslims began voluntarily migrating to the United States, with the Immigration and Nationality Act of 1965 greatly opening up immigration to nonwhite communities in general.

Since the 1960s, many Muslims have migrated to Western Europe. They have arrived as immigrants, guest workers, asylum seekers or as part of family reunification. As a result, the Muslim population in Europe has steadily risen.

== Current demographics ==
A Pew Research study from 2020 estimates that approximately 80 million Muslims make up 29% of all international migrants, slightly above their 25% share of the global population. The majority of these migrants are concentrated in the Middle East-North Africa region (40%), followed by the Asia-Pacific area (24%), Europe (20%), and sub-Saharan Africa (10%), with only 6% in North America. Nearly half of the Muslim migrant population originates from Asia and the Pacific, with one-third from the Middle East and North Africa and 13% from sub-Saharan Africa. Syria has the highest number of Muslim migrants at about 8.1 million, largely due to the Syrian civil war since 2011, with many relocating to Turkey and Lebanon. India is the second-largest source of Muslim migrants, contributing around 6 million, and Afghan migrants number approximately 5.5 million, primarily in Iran and Pakistan, fleeing decades of conflict and instability.

=== Gulf Cooperation Council countries ===
A 2020 Pew Research study highlights that Saudi Arabia, is the leading destination for Muslim migrants, hosting around 10.8 million, which accounts for 13% of all Muslim migrants globally. The kingdom also ranks third for overall migration, with nearly 40% of its population being foreign-born, the vast majority of whom (80%) are Muslim. Following closely is the United Arab Emirates, which is home to over 6 million foreign-born Muslims, making it the second most popular destination. Like Saudi Arabia, the UAE is a wealthy Muslim nation with a significant demand for foreign labor, with international migrants comprising 94% of its population. Most Muslim migrants in both countries primarily come from India.

=== In the West ===
==== Canada ====
As with immigrants in general, Muslim immigrants have come to Canada for a variety of reasons. These include higher education, security, employment, and family reunification. Others have come for religious and political freedom, and safety and security, leaving behind civil wars, persecution, and other forms of civil and ethnic strife. In the 1980s, Canada became an important place of refuge for those fleeing the Lebanese Civil War. The 1990s saw Somali Muslims arrive in the wake of the Somali Civil War as well as Bosniaks fleeing the breakup of the former Yugoslavia. However Canada has yet to receive any significant numbers of Iraqis fleeing the Iraqi War. But in general almost every Muslim country in the world has sent immigrants to Canada – from Pakistan, Bosnia and Herzegovina and Albania to Yemen and Bangladesh.

==== Europe ====
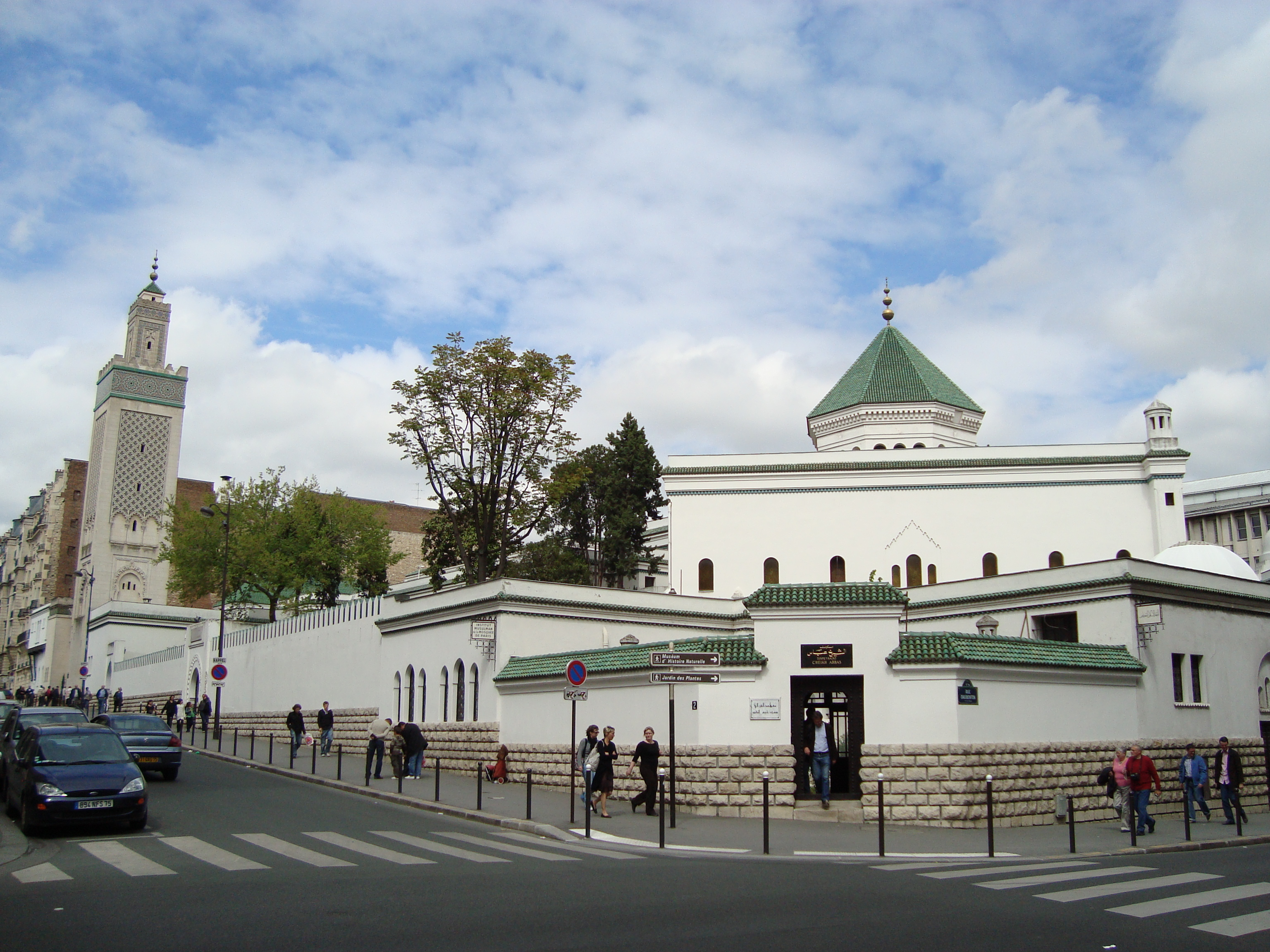
The Great Mosque of Paris, built after World War I

Islam is the second-largest religion in Europe after Christianity. Although the majority of Muslim communities in Western Europe formed as a result of immigration, there are centuries-old indigenous European Muslim communities in the Balkans, Caucasus, Crimea, and Volga region.

From 1990 to 2020, the percentage of Muslims among all migrants residing in Europe rose from 16% to 18%, making them the third-largest religious migrant group in Europe. This increase is primarily attributed to higher migration rates from Algeria, Morocco, Syria, Turkey and Pakistan. In contrast, the proportion of religiously unaffiliated migrants declined, while the share of Christians remained constant. This stability among Christians can be linked to the earlier waves of migration from Russia, with many individuals relocating or dying.

The exact number of Muslims in Europe is unknown but according to estimates by the Pew Forum, the total number of Muslims in Europe (excluding Turkey) in 2010 was about 44 million (6% of the total population), including 19 million (3.8% of the population) in the European Union. A 2010 Pew Research Center study reported that 2.7% of the world's Muslim population live in Europe.

==== Latin America ====
A survey conducted by the Pew Research Center in 2010 found that Muslims make up 0.1% of all of Latin America's population. Based on other estimates, there are 100,000 Muslims in Latin America, mainly concentrated in Brazil, Mexico, Jamaica and Argentina, with smaller concentrations in Venezuela, Haiti, Colombia and Paraguay. Most of these Latin American Muslims are from either Lebanese, Syrian origin.

Suriname has the highest percentage of Muslims in its population for the region, with 13.9% or 75,053 individuals, according to its 2012 census. Islam came to Suriname with immigrants from Indonesia (Java) and South Asia (today India, Pakistan and Bangladesh).

==== United States ====
Islam is the third-largest religion in the United States (1.1%), behind Christianity and Judaism. The Association of Statisticians of American Religious Bodies in its 2017 US Religion census estimated that 1.1% (or 3,450,000) of the population of the United States are Muslim. In 2017, twenty states, mostly in the South and Midwest, reported Islam to be the largest non-Christian religion.

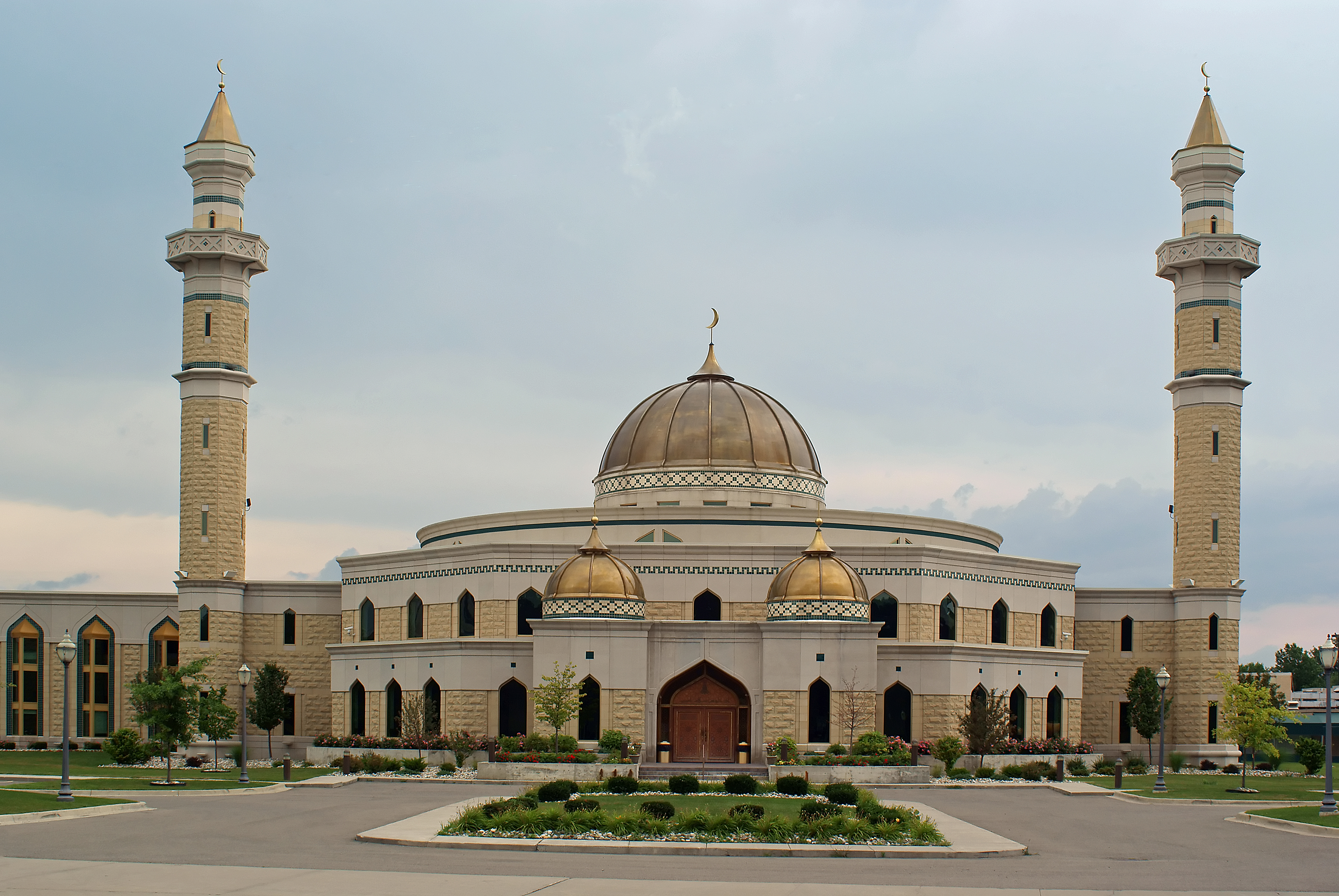
Islamic Center of America, the largest mosque in North America

From the 1880s to 1914, several thousand Muslims immigrated to the United States from the former territories of the Ottoman Empire and British India. The Muslim population of the U.S. increased dramatically in the second half of the 20th century due to the passage of the Immigration and Nationality Act of 1965, which abolished previous immigration quotas. About 72 percent of American Muslims are immigrants or "second generation". By race, in 2014, 38% were non-Hispanic white (including Arabs and Iranians, up from 32% in 2007), 28% were Asian (mostly Indians, Pakistanis, and Bangladeshis, up from 20% in 2007), 28% were black (down from 32%), 4% Hispanic (down from 7%), and 3% of mixed or other race (down from 7%). Since 2007, the black proportion had shrunk, while the white and Asian proportions had grown, mainly due to immigration as most black Muslims were native U.S. blacks.

== Community relations ==
=== Muslim diaspora and its countries of origin ===
The intersection between the Muslim diaspora's relationship with its ancestral homelands and the Muslim diaspora's relationship with foreign Islamic communities as part of the global Ummah has been called into question by some in the host countries of the diaspora, with scholars offering different ways of approaching the connections between the two relationships.

=== Muslim diaspora and its host countries ===
==== In the West ====
Muslims have become an integral part of almost every Western country. There is sometimes a journey to seek understanding between the diaspora's Islam-influenced values and the Western values of their host countries; Muslim migrants of minority denominations (such as the Ahmadiyyas) have been found to be faster at assimilating into Western cultural norms than migrants of majority denominations (such as Sunni Islam).

Some European countries have growing far-right populist movements against Muslims, such as with Geert Wilders in the Netherlands. A February 2017 poll of 10,000 people in 10 European countries by Chatham House found on average a majority (55%) were opposed to further Muslim immigration, with opposition especially pronounced in a number of countries: Poland (71%), Austria (65%), Hungary (64%), Belgium (64%), and France (61%). Except for Poland, all of those had recently suffered jihadist terror attacks or been at the centre of a refugee crisis. Of those opposed to further Muslim immigration, 3/4 classify themselves as on the right of the political spectrum. Of those self-classifying as on the left of the political spectrum, 1/3 supported a halt.

== See also ==
- Demographic jihad
- Divisions of the world in Islam
- Islam by country
- Islam in the African diaspora
