= Demographic jihad =

Islamophobic conspiracy theory

Demographic jihad or population jihad is a purported phenomenon in which Muslims migrate to or have many children in a particular region in order to achieve demographic and perceived political or social dominance.

== India ==
Hindu nationalists often claim that Muslim population growth is greatly outstripping the Hindu majority's population growth in India; however, the data suggests that Muslim population growth rates are converging rapidly with Hindu population growth rates.

== Southeast Asia ==
=== Buddhist regions ===
Significant violence has occurred against Muslim minorities in Buddhist nations within Southeast Asia, with a common rationale being the fear that Muslims are trying to outbreed the Buddhist population, including by raping Buddhist women.

=== Muslim regions ===
The Jemaah Tarbiyah movement in Indonesia has advocated for the Islamization of society by encouraging the formation of Islamic families.

== The West ==
=== Europe ===
European countries have taken in many refugees and migrants from Muslim-majority countries in recent decades, with far-right groups alleging that Muslim immigration will overwhelm Europe's historically Christian demographics; it has been noted that these anti-Muslim sentiments are echoed historically by antisemitic sentiments within Europe.

In the Czech Republic, some groups have alleged that demographic jihad against Europe is being assisted by European NGOs and corrupt politicians, with two-thirds of Czechs seeing Islam as a threat.
