= British diaspora =

Ethnic group

Total population
- Estimated at 200 million

Regions with significant populations
- United States: 109,531,643 (up to 33% of population) (Note: The 2020 United States census results for those Americans who identify with full or partial "English", "Scottish", "Welsh", "Manx", "Channel Islander", "Scotch Irish", "Irish" or "American" ancestry. Demographers regard current figures as a "serious under-count", as a large proportion of Americans of British descent have a tendency to simply identify as 'American' since 1980 where over 13.3 million or 5.9% of the total U.S. population self-identified as "American" or "United States", this was counted under "not specified".)
- Australia: 19,301,379 (up to 76% of population) (Note: Estimated number of Australians of Anglo-Celtic descent. Includes Australians who identified their ancestry as part of the "North-Western European" ancestry group or as "Australian" at the 2021 census. Over 88% of Australians within the North-Western European ancestry group identified with at least one Anglo-Celtic ancestor. The Australian Bureau of Statistics has stated that most people nominating "Australian" ancestry have at least partial Anglo-Celtic European ancestry.)
- Canada: 17,325,860 (up to 48% of population) (Note: Canadians of British Isles, English-speaking "Canadian", "American", "Australian", "New Zealander", "Albertan", "British Columbian", "Cape Bretoner", "Manitoban", "New Brunswicker", "Nova Scotian", "Prince Edward Islander", "Saskatchewanian" and "United Empire Loyalist" descent.)
- New Zealand: 3,372,708 (up to 70.2% of population) (Note: New Zealanders of European descent, the vast majority of whom are estimated to have some British ancestry.)
- South Africa: 1,600,000 (4% of population)
- France: 400,000
- Spain: 297,229 (2014)
- Argentina: 270,000 (2015)
- United Arab Emirates: 240,000 (2010)
- Germany: 178,000 (2021)

Languages
- Predominantly English; Also: Welsh, Scottish Gaelic, Irish, Scots, Ulster Scots, Cornish, Manx, British Sign Language and other languages, depending on their host countries.

Religion
- Predominantly Christianity (Anglican, Presbyterian, Methodist, Catholic, etc.)

The British diaspora consists of people of English, Scottish, Welsh, Northern Irish, Cornish, Manx and Channel Islands ancestral descent who live outside the United Kingdom and its Crown Dependencies.

In 2008, the United Kingdom's Foreign and Commonwealth Office estimated that at least 80% of New Zealanders had some British ancestry, however at the 2018 census only 70% of New Zealanders identified as having some European ancestry. Up to 76% of Australians, 48% of Canadians, 33% of Americans, and 3% of South Africans have ancestry from the British Isles. There are approximately 700,000 Chileans of British descent, constituting the largest British diaspora in Latin America, additionally, at least 270,000 Argentines have some British ancestry. More than 300,000 Anglo-Indians have some British ancestry, but they comprise less than 0.1% of India's population.

The British diaspora includes about 200 million people worldwide. Other countries with over 100,000 British expatriates each include the Republic of Ireland, Spain, France, Germany, and the United Arab Emirates.

== History of British diaspora ==
=== Up to the 19th century ===
The first documented exodus of Britons began during the Anglo-Saxon invasion of post-Roman Britannia. From the 4th century CE a large number of Brythonic-speaking Celts fled or migrated to what is now Brittany on the coast of France, becoming the Bretons.

The second large-scale British migration came following the Norman Conquest of England (1066), which led to a displacement of English people, mostly dispossessed nobility. They settled in neighboring regions including Ireland and Scandinavia, and as far east as Crimea and Anatolia in the Byzantine Empire. Englishmen eventually replaced Scandinavians as the main recruits for the Byzantine Emperor's personal Varangian Guard based in Constantinople.

After the Age of Discovery, various peoples of the British Isles, and especially the English, became among the earliest and by far the largest groups to found European emigrant communities. Indeed, the British Empire's expansion — especially during the first half of the 19th century — saw an extraordinary dispersion of the British people, with particular concentrations of settlers in Australasia and in North America.

The British Empire, "built on waves of migration overseas by British people" who left Great Britain (later the United Kingdom) and reached across the globe, permanently affected population structures in three continents. As a result of the British colonisation of the Americas, what became the United States was "easily the greatest single destination of emigrant British", but in what would become the Commonwealth of Australia the British experienced a birth rate higher than anything seen before, which together with continuing British immigration resulted in a huge outnumbering of indigenous Australians.

In colonies and territories such as those in the Indian subcontinent, Southern Rhodesia, British Hong Kong, Singapore, Jamaica, Barbados, Malaya, and the Cape Colony, permanently-resident British communities took root, and while never more than a numerical minority, these Britons exercised a dominant influence upon the culture and politics of those lands. In Australia, Canada, and New Zealand, people of British origin came to constitute the majority of the population, contributing to these countries becoming integral to the Anglosphere.

The British not only emigrated to lands which formed or would form part of the British Empire, but also settled in large numbers in other areas of the Americas, particularly in the United States and in sizeable numbers in Argentina, Chile (Note: In 1854, during the Chilean silver rush, 611 "Englishmen" were registered in the census of the Province of Atacama making up about 9% of the foreigners in the said province far behind Argentines who numbered 5703.) and Mexico. British traders and military personnel wandered and settled far and wide: the Anglo-Russians provide an example.

=== 19th century ===
The Second British Empire, growing following the departure of 13 of Britain's various North American colonies in the late-18th century, saw bulk British emigration to Canada, South Africa and Australasia. In the 19th century, inhabitants of Ireland (as part of the United Kingdom of Great Britain and Ireland from 1801) could count as "British" in colonial statistics — they became a important sub-group in the population of Australia.

The United Kingdom census, 1861 estimated the number of overseas British to be around 2.5 million. However, it concluded that most of these were "not conventional settlers" but rather "travellers, merchants, professionals, and military personnel". By 1890, there were over 1.5 million further British-born people living in Australia, Canada, New Zealand, and South Africa.

=== British diaspora today ===
According to the Foreign and Commonwealth Office, there were 13.1 million British nationals living abroad in 2004–05. These figures are taken from the consular annual returns from overseas posts. There is no requirement for UK citizens to register with British missions overseas, so these figures are therefore based on the most reliable information that can be obtained, e.g. from host government official statistics.

A 2006 publication from the Institute for Public Policy Research estimated that 5.5 million British-born people lived outside the United Kingdom.

In terms of outbound expatriation, in 2009, the United Kingdom had the most expatriates among developed OECD countries, with more than three million British living abroad, a figure followed by Germany and Italy. On an annual basis, emigration from Britain stood at about 400,000 per year during the ten years until 2010 at least.

Living abroad can affect certain rights for British citizens living abroad; for example, until the passing of the Elections Act 2022, those resident outside the UK for more than 15 years ceased to be eligible to vote, but this restriction was removed, taking effect before the 2024 general election In addition, the British Mental Health Act 1983 rules that persons resident abroad do not qualify as "nearest relative" of a person who is ordinarily resident in the United Kingdom, the Channel Islands or the Isle of Man.

== Distribution ==
Map of the British diaspora in the world by population (includes people with British ancestry or citizenship): United Kingdom + 10,000,000 + 1,000,000 + 100,000 + 10,000

The earliest migrations of Britons date from the 5th and 6th centuries AD, when Brittonic Celts fleeing the Anglo-Saxon invasions migrated what is today northern France and north western Spain and forged the colonies of Brittany and Britonia. Brittany remained independent of France until the early 16th century and still retains a distinct Brittonic culture and language, whilst Britonia in modern Galicia was absorbed into Spanish states by the end of the 9th century AD.

Britons – people with British citizenship or of British descent – have a significant presence in a number of countries other than the United Kingdom, and in particular in those with historic connections to the British Empire. After the Age of Discovery, the British were one of the earliest and largest communities to emigrate out of Europe, and the British Empire's expansion during the first half of the 19th century triggered an "extraordinary dispersion of the British people", resulting in particular concentrations "in Australasia and North America".

The United Kingdom Census 1861 estimated the size of the overseas British to be around 2.5 million, but concluded that most of these were "not conventional settlers" but rather "travellers, merchants, professionals, and military personnel". By 1890, there were over 1.5 million further UK-born people living in Australia, Canada, New Zealand and South Africa. A 2006 publication from the Institute for Public Policy Research estimated 5.6 million Britons lived outside the United Kingdom.

Outside the United Kingdom and its Overseas Territories, up to 76% of Australians, 70% of New Zealanders, 48% of Canadians, 33% of Americans and 3% of South Africans have ancestry from the British Isles. Hong Kong has the highest proportion of British nationals outside the United Kingdom and its Overseas Territories, with 47% of Hong Kong residents holding a British National (Overseas) status or a British citizenship. The next highest concentrations of British citizens outside the United Kingdom and its Overseas Territories are located in Barbados (10%), the Republic of Ireland (7%), Australia (6%) and New Zealand (5%).

Country	British ancestry / %		British citizens	Comments
United States	109,531,643 (2020)	33% (Note: The 2020 United States census results for those Americans who identify with full or partial "English", "Scottish", "Welsh", "Manx", "Channel Islander", "Scotch Irish", "Irish" and "American" ancestry. A large proportion of Americans of British descent have a tendency to simply identify as 'American' since 1980 where over 13.3 million or 5.9% of the total U.S. population self-identified as "American" or "United States", this was counted under "not specified".)	678,000 (2006)	See British Americans, English Americans, Scottish Americans, Welsh Americans and Scotch-Irish Americans; country with the most people of British descent.
Australia	19,301,379 (2021)	76% (Note: Estimated number of Australians of Anglo-Celtic descent. Includes Australians who identified their ancestry as part of the "North-Western European" ancestry group or as "Australian" at the 2021 census. Over 88% of Australians within the North-Western European ancestry group identified with at least one Anglo-Celtic ancestry.)	1,300,000 (2006)	See Anglo-Celtic Australians, English Australians, Scottish Australians and Welsh Australians; most British citizens in the world outside the United Kingdom.
Canada	17,325,860 (2021)	48% (Note: Canadians of British Isles, English-speaking "Canadian", "American", "Australian", "New Zealander", "Albertan", "British Columbian", "Cape Bretoner", "Manitoban", "New Brunswicker", "Nova Scotian", "Prince Edward Islander", "Saskatchewanian" and "United Empire Loyalist" descent.)	603,000 (2006)	See British Canadians, English Canadians, Scottish Canadians and Welsh Canadians.
New Zealand	3,372,708 (2018)	70% (Note: New Zealanders of European descent, the vast majority of whom are estimated to have some British ancestry.)	215,000 (2006)	See British New Zealanders, English New Zealanders, Scottish New Zealanders and Welsh New Zealanders.
South Africa	1,600,000 (2011)	3%	212,000 (2006)	See British Africans.
Ireland	291,000 (2006)	7%	291,000 (2006)	See Anglo-Irish people.
Argentina	270,000 (2015)	0.6%	8,300 (2006)	See English Argentines, Scottish Argentines, Welsh Argentines.
Pakistan	N/A	N/A	47,000 (2006)	See Britons in Pakistan.
India	N/A	N/A	32,000 (2006)	See Britons in India.
Bangladesh	N/A	N/A	9,200 (2006)	See Britons in Bangladesh.
Bahamas	38,000 (2019)	10%	4,100 (2006)	See White Bahamians.
Barbados	20,000 (2021)	7%	27,000 (2006)	See White Barbadians.
Bermuda	15,700 (2006)	7%	600 (2006)	See White Bermudians.
Cayman Islands	9,600 (2021)	30%	110 (2006)	
Gibraltar	9,100 (2006)	27%	3,600 (2006)	
Falkland Islands	2,474 (2016)	80%	930 (2006)	
Norfolk Island	857 (2016)	49%	<100 (2006)	
Pitcairn Islands	35 (2023)	100%		

Note: A different estimate puts China (incl. Hong Kong) ahead with a population of 3,750,000 British citizens, most of which are those in Hong Kong who have continued to possess British nationality, particularly the British nationals (overseas) status, which numbered 3.4 million, through their connection with the former crown colony (see British nationality and Hong Kong for further details).

== Culture ==
=== Sports ===
The British diaspora played a significant role in bringing British sports to the world. British sailors and soldiers contributed to association football becoming the most popular sport in the world.

In a few places, Britons helped establish cricket, only for it to be replaced by baseball, an American sport with English antecedents. This happened in the United States and then later Japan in the late 19th century.

== See also ==
- Anglosphere
- British Empire
  - Commonwealth diaspora
- CANZUK
- Scottish diaspora
- Anglo-Israelis
