= Indians in Bangladesh =

People of Indian origin settled in Bangladesh

Indians in Bangladesh are citizens of India who reside in Bangladesh either legally or illegally. The presence and number of Indian nationals in Bangladesh has been a subject of discussion and, at times, controversy.

Cross-border movement from India to Bangladesh is constrained by restrictions on entry and employment. Government agencies on both sides track flows of registered migrants but lack reliable estimates of unauthorized migration. It is difficult to accurately quantify irregular migration because it is clandestine. Both countries acknowledge the need for reliable and comparable national migration data, but as of 2025, collection and publication remain a work in progress.

== Population ==
The Indian government estimates there are 19,000 Indians living in Bangladesh, and 9,000 of them are students. However, in 2009, a column published in The Financial Express, made an unsubstantiated claim that between 500,000 and 1,000,000 Indians are staying illegally in Bangladesh. The article claims that they were found working in different industries such as NGOs, garments, textiles, and information technology, and sent money home through hundi transfer systems.

== Remittance ==
According to a Financial Express report citing Finance Minister Abul Hasan Mahmud Ali's statement in Parliament, foreigners transferred $130.6 million out of Bangladesh during the first 10 months of FY24. Of this amount, Indian nationals alone remitted over $50 million making India the largest destination for Bangladesh's outward remittance.

== See also ==
- Bangladesh–India relations
- Indian diaspora
- Immigration to Bangladesh
- Bangladeshis in India
