= Divisions of the world in Islam =

Islamic demarcation of Muslim and non-Muslim lands

In classical Islamic law, the two major divisions of the world are dar al-Islam (lit. 'territory of Islam'), and dar al-harb (lit. 'territory of war'). Dar al-Islam denotes lands under Islamic rule and dar al-harb denotes lands under non-Muslim rule. Muslims regard Islam as a universal religion and believe it to be the rightful law for all humankind. According to Islam, this should first be attempted peacefully through Dawah. In the case of war, Muslims are imposed to eliminate fighters until they surrender or seek peace and pay the Jizya if subdued.

The Arabic singular form dar (دار), translated literally, may mean "house", "abode", "structure", "place", "land", or "country". In Islamic jurisprudence it often refers to a part of the world. The notions of "houses" or "divisions" of the world in Islam such as dar al-Islam and dar al-harb does not appear in the Quran or the hadith. According to Abou El Fadl, the only dars the Quran speaks of are "the abode of the Hereafter and the abode of the earthly life, with the former described as clearly superior to the latter".

Early Islamic jurists devised these terms to denote legal rulings for ongoing Muslim conquests almost a century after Muhammad. The first use of the terms was in Iraq by Abu Hanifa and his disciples Abu Yusuf and Al-Shaybani. Among those in the Levant, Al-Awza'i was leading in this discipline and later Al-Shafi'i.

The concept of dar al-harb has been affected by historical changes such as the political fragmentation of the Muslim world. The theoretical distinction between dar al-Islam and dar al-harb is widely considered inapplicable, and many contemporary Islamic jurists regard the Western world as part of the former, since Muslims can freely practise and proselytize their faith in Western countries. The Qur’an directs Muslims to spread the message of Islam worldwide declaring it to be a religion for all humankind.

== Major religious divisions ==
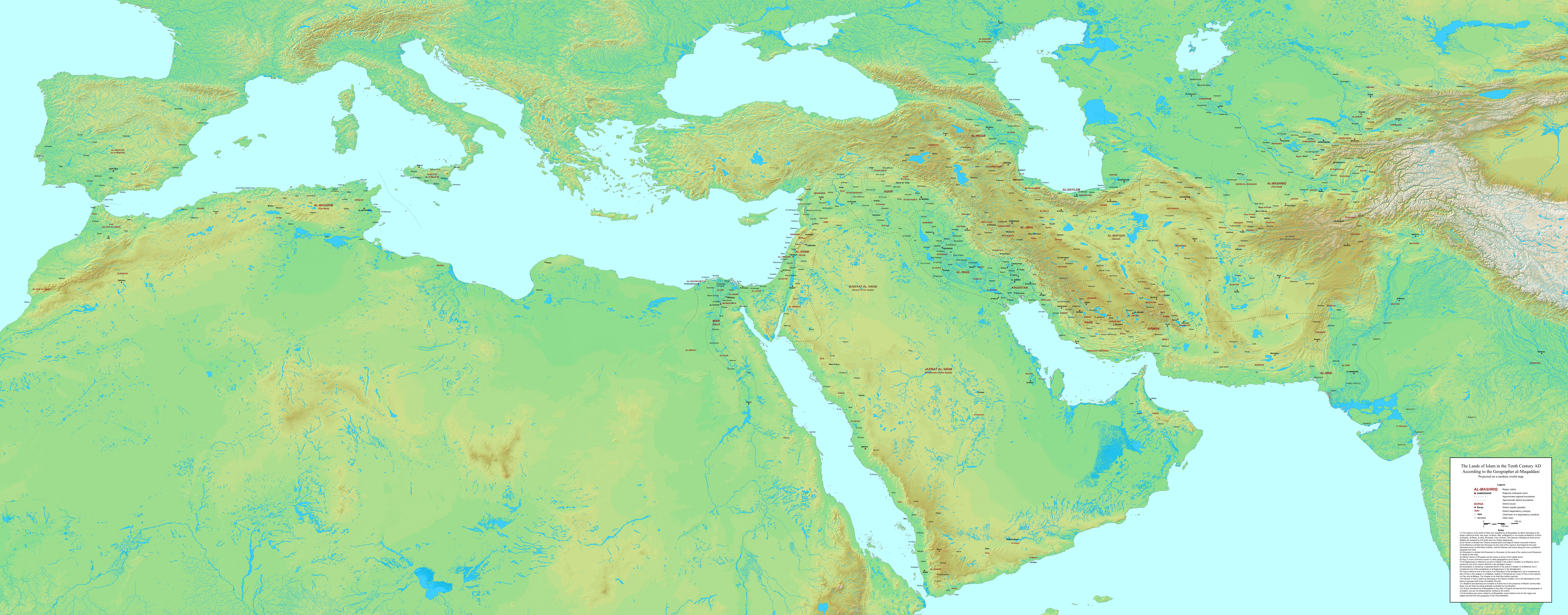
The lands and cities of the Dar al-Islam in the 10th century, according to the geographer al-Muqaddasi

Early Islamic legal theory divided the world into two divisions: "abode of Islam" and "abode of war". The first, called dar al-Islam, sometimes Pax Islamica, consisted of Muslims and non-Muslims living under Islamic sovereignty. The second was dar al-harb, ruled by non-Muslims and specifically infidels. Another secondary division of Dar al-'Ahd was assigned for territories ruled by non-Muslims that have a treaty of non-aggression or peace with Muslims, effectively an intermediate status between the two major divisions.

=== Dar al-Islam ===
Dar al-Islam (Arabic: دار الإسلام lit. 'house/abode of Islam'; or dar at-Tawhid lit. 'house/abode of monotheism') was a term used by Ulama (Muslim legal scholars) to refer to those countries under Muslim sovereignty, sometimes considered "the home of Islam" or Pax Islamica. Dar al-Islam meaning "house/abode of Islam" is also referred to as dar al-salam or "house/abode of peace". In the Quran (10.25 and 6.127) this term refers to Paradise in Heaven.

Dar al-Islam consisted of Muslims and non-Muslims, with the latter living as dhimmis (protected persons). The non-Muslims had the right to their own law and religion in exchange for paying the jizya. While Muslims enjoyed full civil rights, non-Muslims were given partial civil rights. However, both Muslims and non-Muslims were equal in their claim to security and being protected from attack. For example, if an enemy seized dar al-Islam's citizens, the state was obliged to free them, whether they were Muslim or non-Muslim.

Likewise, in foreign affairs, the Muslim government represented both its Muslim and non-Muslim citizens. Relations between Muslims and non-Muslims were regulated by "constitutional charters" (special agreements issued by the authorities), and these agreements recognized the personal law of each non-Muslim community (e.g. the Jewish community, Christian community etc). Non-Muslims could access Islamic courts if they wished.

According to Abu Hanifa, considered to be the originator of the concept, the requirements for a country to be part of dar al-Islam are:

1. Muslims must be able to enjoy peace and security with and within this country.
2. The country should be ruled by a Muslim government.
3. It has common frontiers with some Muslim countries.

=== Dar al-harb ===
Dar al-harb (Arabic: دار الحرب "house of war") was a term classically referring to those countries which do not have a treaty of non-aggression or peace with Muslims (those that do are called dar al-'Ahd or dar al-Sulh). The notions of divisions of the world, or dar al-harb, does not appear in the Quran or the Hadith. According to some scholars, the term "abode of war" was simply a description of the harsh reality of the premodern world.

According to Majid Khadduri, the fundamental distinction between dar al-Islam and dar al-harb was introduced after the defeat of the Umayyad Caliphate at the Battle of Tours in 732 which prevented the expansion of Islam to the north, while at the same time the expansion of the caliphate to the east had been halted. Wahbah al-Zuhayli argues that the concept of dar al-harb is mostly historical: "The existence of Dār al-Islām and Dār al-Ḥarb in contemporary times is rare or extremely limited. This is because Islamic countries have joined the United Nations covenant that stipulates that the relationship between nations is peace and not war. Therefore non-Muslim countries are Dār al-‘Ahd ..."

According to Abu Hanifa there are three conditions that need to be fulfilled for a land to be classified as dar al-harb:

1. Implementation of the laws of the non-Muslims openly and that no rule of Islam is implemented any longer
2. Bordering another dar al-harb
3. No Muslim remains safe as he was before the non-Muslims took power.

The purpose behind differentiating between dar al-Islam and dar al-harb was to identify the land as either one of safety for the Muslims or of fear. So, if Muslims are generally safe in a land and not in fear, then it cannot be classified as dar al-harb.

During European colonization, the status of colonized territories such as British India was debated, with some saying that it was dar al-harb. However, there was no suggestion that Muslims were therefore required to wage jihad against the colonizers.

Under the classical doctrine, it was the duty of Muslim rulers to bring dar al-harb under Islamic sovereignty. A state of war was presumed between dar al-harb and dar al-Islam, but this did not necessarily imply that hostilities must occur. It was up to the ruler to decide when, where and against whom to wage war. So in practice there was often peace between dar al-Islam and dar al-harb; formal armistices could last up to 10 years, while informal peace could last much longer than 10 years.

Since dar al-Islam was considered to be in a state of constant warfare with dar-al-harb unless there was a formal peace treaty, and non-Muslim prisoners of war were viewed as a legitimate target of enslavement according to the rules of slavery in Islam, the dar al-harb was historically used as a slave supply source for the slave trade during the era of slavery in the Muslim world.

During periods of a formal peace treaty with a territory in dar al-harb, it was immune from attack by Muslims, and its inhabitants (called harbi) could enter Muslim lands unmolested. In the absence of a peace treaty, a harbi could also enter Muslim lands safely if that 'harbi first obtained an aman (assurance of protection). It was through such aman that trade and cultural exchange was conducted between dar al-harb and dar al-Islam. Any adult Muslim resident of dar al-Islam (male or female, free or slave) could grant such aman to a harbi. Al-Shaybani ruled that even non-Muslim residents (dhimmis) could grant aman, while others sources say non-Muslim residents could not grant aman.

== See also ==
- Caliphate
- Christendom
- Islamic missionary activity
- Muslim diaspora
- Pan-Islamism
- Sectarian violence among Muslims
- Ummah
- Sons of Noah
