= Islam in the African diaspora =

The practice of Islam by members of the African diaspora may be a consequence of African Muslims retaining their religion after leaving Africa (as for many Muslims in Europe) or of people of African ethnicity converting to Islam, as among many African-American Muslims, where conversion is often presented as a recovery of an African heritage lost during the Atlantic slave trade. In many regions, African-diaspora Muslims are an intersectional minority, and may face both racism and anti-Islam sentiment.

== Background ==
Islam has existed in Africa for a long time. It first arrived in North Africa up until around the 8th century when the religion began to spread south and west. It spread across sub-Saharan Africa since the 8th century onwards, where Islam is the majority or significant minority religion in many modern countries. The states that Islam was able to spread through and begin to influence were in West Africa (including places like Senegal, Gambia, Niger, Guinea, Burkina Faso, Mali, and Nigeria). It is even seen today in many of those countries that there is still that presence and some influence of Islam. Researchers also believe that it is very likely that Islam was able to spread into Africa due to trade throughout the Mediterranean Sea and trans-Saharan routes. It is a known fact that throughout history trade has been one of the biggest forms of communication and a very useful pathway as people trade more than just goods, but also practices and religious traditions that others tend to adopt.

Aside from just trade as the most popular way that Islam made its way into Western Africa, there were also religious teachers or even Islamic missionaries that were looking to spread their faith, often as a side effect of engaging in trade or working with local polities. Without all of this trade, Islam would not have been able to spread to the vast number of people it did in Africa and in turn not make its influence on the people and other religions of that area.

An article by the Lowcountry Digital History Initiative mentioned how some of these northern and west African kings converted to Islam themselves when the spreading happened, and those that did not convert were completely fine with allowing others to practice this newly introduced religion. The article goes on to mention that the mass number of conversions to Islam would not end up happening until much later around the 17th century. It continues on explaining how as more and more people converted, new practices were developed, and some older ones were left behind. In other words, as the religion grew it began to change and evolve into one that more and more people wanted to be a part of. They were able to make some changes that made more sense to them and keep the religion intriguing and popular within the newer countries.

== History ==
Islam was already well established in West Africa by the time the transatlantic slave trade started, having reached northern Nigeria by the fourteenth century. There, it syncretized with West African traditional religion, resulting in the development of Sufist practices. These practices also came to the Americas during the slave trade. Most Muslim Africans enslaved to the Americas were captured in raids and expeditions during a time span of 350 years. Between fifteen to thirty percent of the enslaved people that were brought to the Americas through the slave trade practiced some form of Islam. Out of these, many continued to practice Islam, thus becoming the first major Muslim populations in the Americas, at least in the American South.

The slave trade would be the reason for the first presence of Muslims and Islam in the United States. These slaves continued to practice and preach their traditions and ways of life and pass them on to their friends and families growing the culture and religion. These same Lowcountry articles continue to go on and talk about how Americans only picture middle eastern people and even the violent terrorist groups that come from some of those counties when thinking about Islam. But in reality, Islam had been in this country for many years prior to these groups and stereotypes and that people tend to forget about how Islam arrived in this country in the first place. Without the presence of Muslims coming from the slave trade, it is unlikely that Islam would have been able to spread and have an influence as much as it does in the country today. Islam was an escape for these slaves as it was something from their home and roots that they could continue to practice and live through to keep their heritage and beliefs alive.

== See also ==
- Muslim diaspora
