= William Allsworth =

British painter (1811–1864)

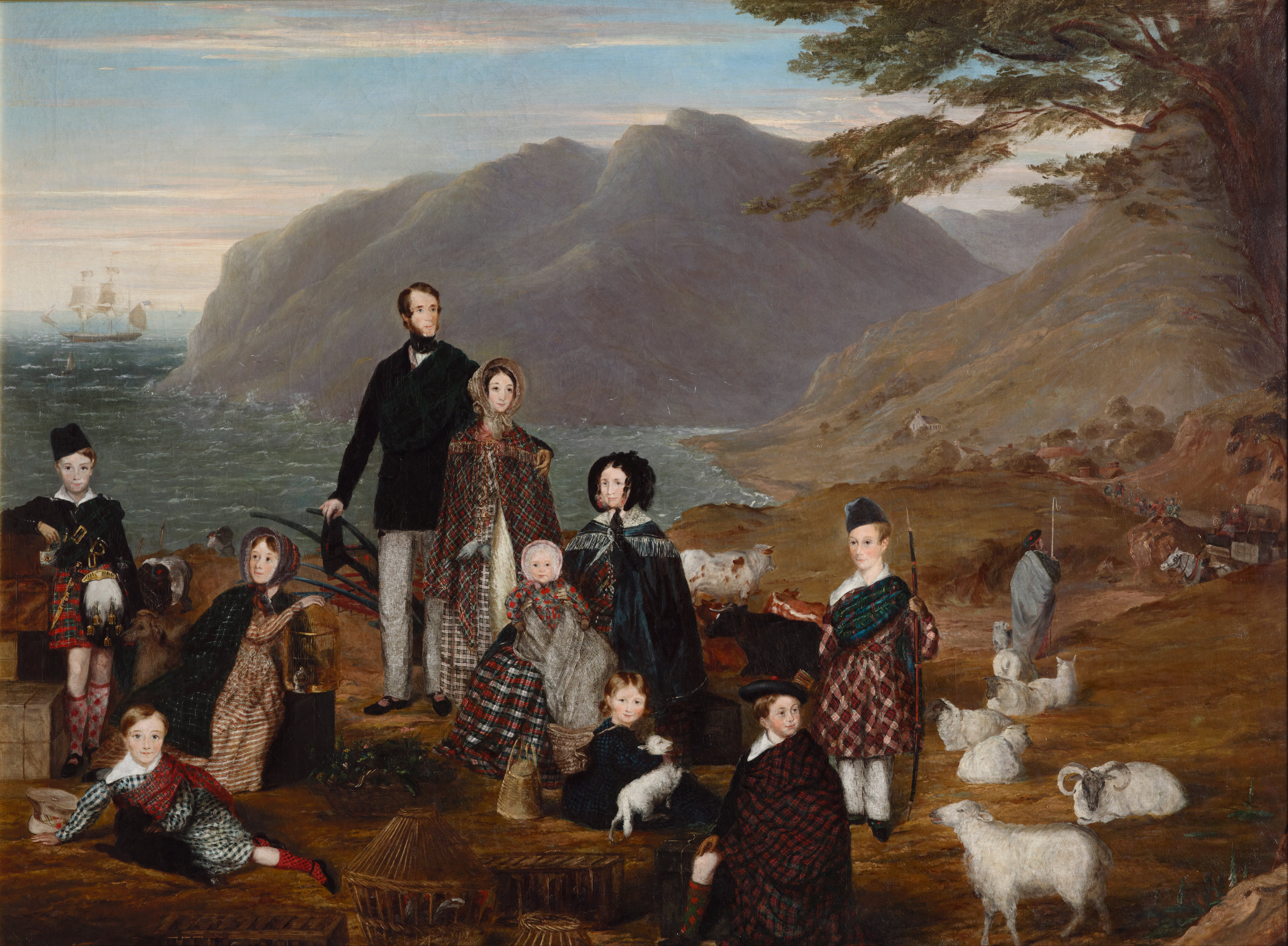
The Emigrants by William Allsworth. Museum of New Zealand Te Papa Tongarewa, Wellington.

William Allsworth (21 April 1811–10 January 1864) was an English painter. He exhibited at the Royal Academy. He is known for his 1844 painting The Emigrants which depicts a Scottish family preparing to emigrate to New Zealand. The painting is in the collection of the Museum of New Zealand Te Papa Tongarewa.

In 2016 artist Paul Stephenson painted reflections onto two portraits by Allsworth for an exhibition called Forced Collaboration.
