= Commonwealth diaspora =

Diaspora of the British Commonwealth

Commonwealth nations

The Commonwealth diaspora is the group of people whose ancestry traces back to countries in the Commonwealth of Nations, a group mainly consisting of former British colonies. (Note: The term is also sometimes used to describe diasporas who currently live in Commonwealth nations.)

== History ==
=== Colonial era ===
The Indian diaspora is substantially based in former British colonies; this influenced India to retain Commonwealth membership

The British Empire enabled a substantial amount of commercial migration; for example, 1.5 million Indian merchants are estimated to have gone abroad in the 19th century. Preferential access to trade with other British colonies, as well as new commercial opportunities unlocked within India by railways and markets established by the British, influenced this migration flow. Indian migrants played a significant role in the expansion of the British Empire, though at times involuntarily, as in the case of many indentured servants or exiled criminals.

=== Contemporary era ===
In the aftermath of the Second World War and the rapid breakup of the British Empire, Britain invited Commonwealth citizens to immigrate to Britain as part of the post-war rebuilding of the nation. Many of these immigrants faced significant racism. Restrictions on Commonwealth migration to Britain later emerged with the Commonwealth Immigrants Act 1962.

Intra-Commonwealth migration began to slow down in general, as recently liberated countries began to develop a greater sense of national identity and desire to limit foreign influences in general.

==== Recent decades ====
The Commonwealth diaspora in Britain in particular has been identified as a potential asset, allowing Britain to make economic and other connections to other Commonwealth countries, which has been a particularly relevant topic of discussion as Britain charts its post-Brexit future and decides which groupings of countries to focus on working with (such as with the European Union).

Immigration between Commonwealth countries, which makes up half of all Commonwealth migration, has played a significant role in linking Commonwealth countries together economically and culturally.

The British royalty have previously hosted events commemorating this diaspora.

== Culture ==
=== Language ===
The English language has played a role in facilitating migration within the Commonwealth.

=== Sport ===
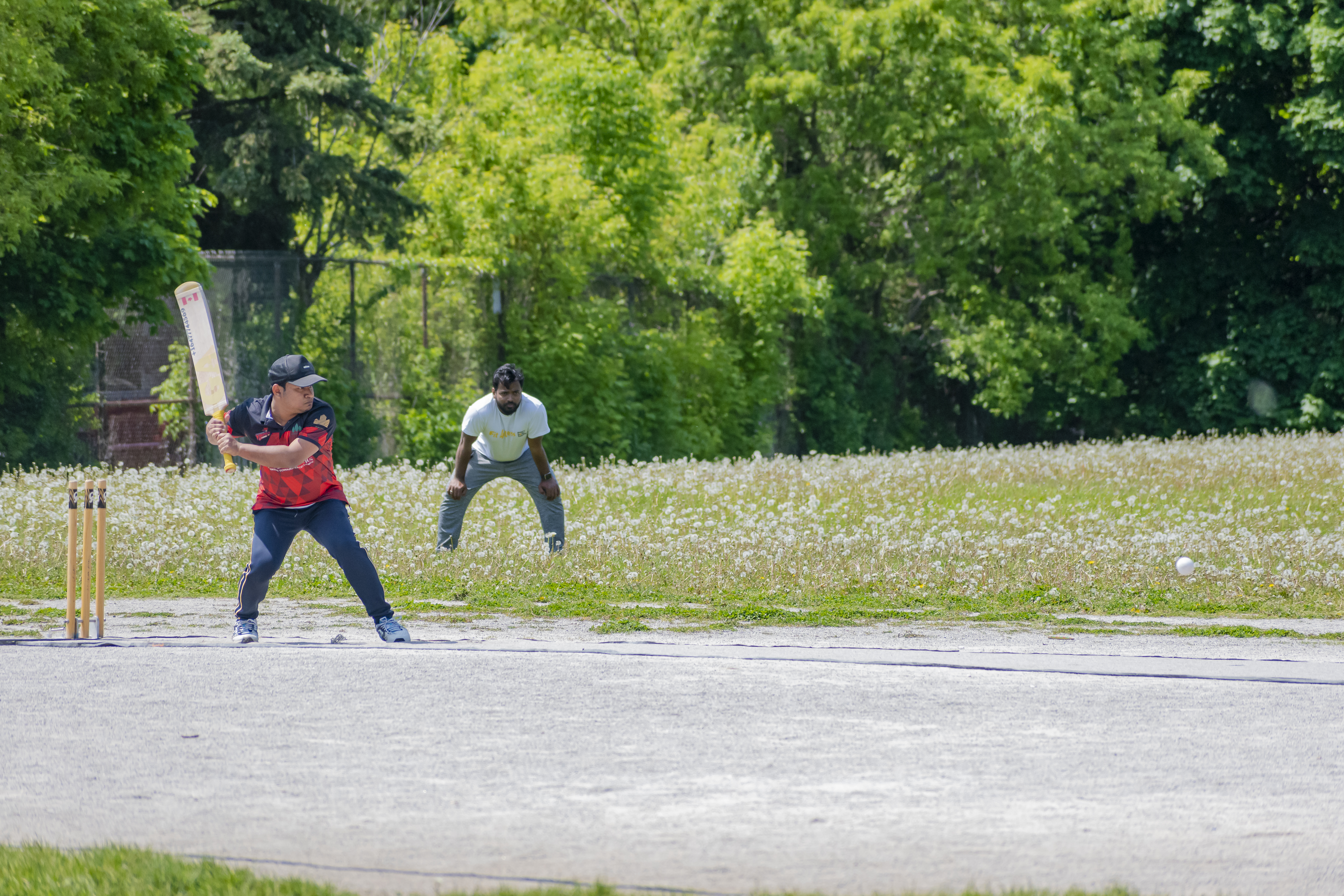
The South Asian diaspora playing cricket in Toronto, Canada.

Various groups in the Commonwealth diaspora, such as Caribbean diasporas, have been noted for being bound together by the sport of cricket, as well as re-introducing cricket to a number of countries, such as Canada and the United States.

== See also ==
- British diaspora
- Colonial diaspora
- American diaspora
