= Colonial diaspora =

Descendants of colonial-era migrants

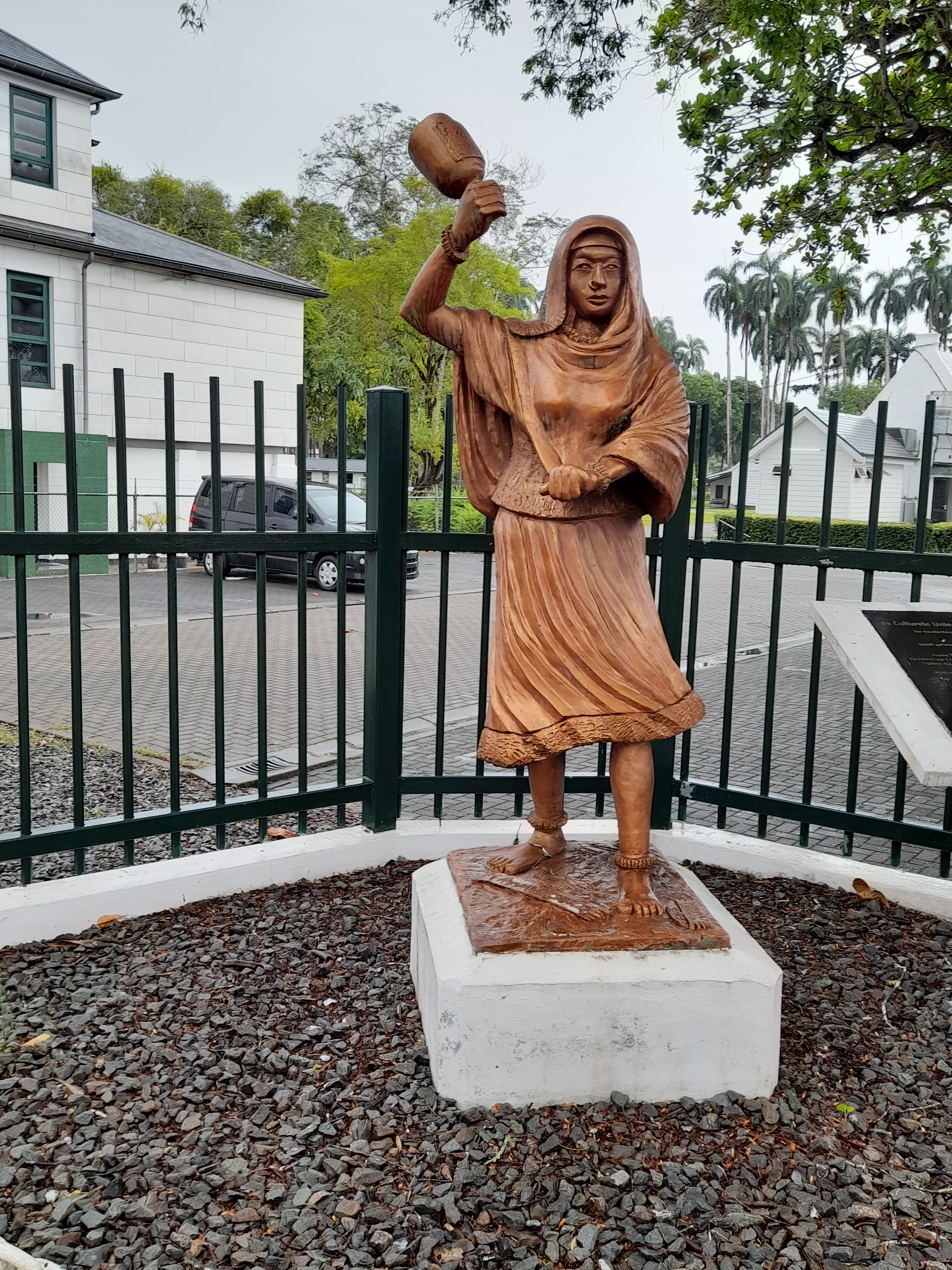
A statue of Janey Tetary, an Indian indentured servant who died in an 1884 uprising in Suriname.

A colonial diaspora is a group of people that live outside of their ancestral homeland because their ancestors migrated as part of a colonial-era practice. Depending on the source, the term refers to either people originating from the colonizing group or those whose ancestors were shifted under colonial pressure.

== Colonial diasporas by origin ==
=== Europe ===
In ancient times, many Greek city-states established colonies around the Mediterranean, as far away as Iberia and the Pontic Steppe. The Macedonian Empire and her successor states settled Greeks and Macedonians in colonies from Egypt to Northwestern India.

During the colonial era that ended after World War 2, Europeans migrated around their global empires, with significant groups settling in the Western Hemisphere and Australasia.

=== South Asia ===
Over 1 million Indian people were taken as indentured servants to other parts of the world during the British Empire, primarily to the Caribbean and Southeast Africa. Because they had left South Asia before the establishment of the current independent nations of that region, they were often denied citizenship in South Asia, and because they were also sometimes expelled or otherwise treated like non-citizens in their host countries, some of them or their families were forced to migrate twice.

== Postcolonial diasporas ==
Postcolonial diasporas are similar to colonial diasporas in that both groups often migrated in a way that addressed the global demand for labor. Postcolonial diasporas tend to split into those who have migrated as part of a "post-national" clique that has economic dealings with multiple countries, and those who have migrated out of a sense of exile.

== See also ==
- African diaspora
- Commonwealth diaspora
