= Western values =

Values underpinning Western civilization

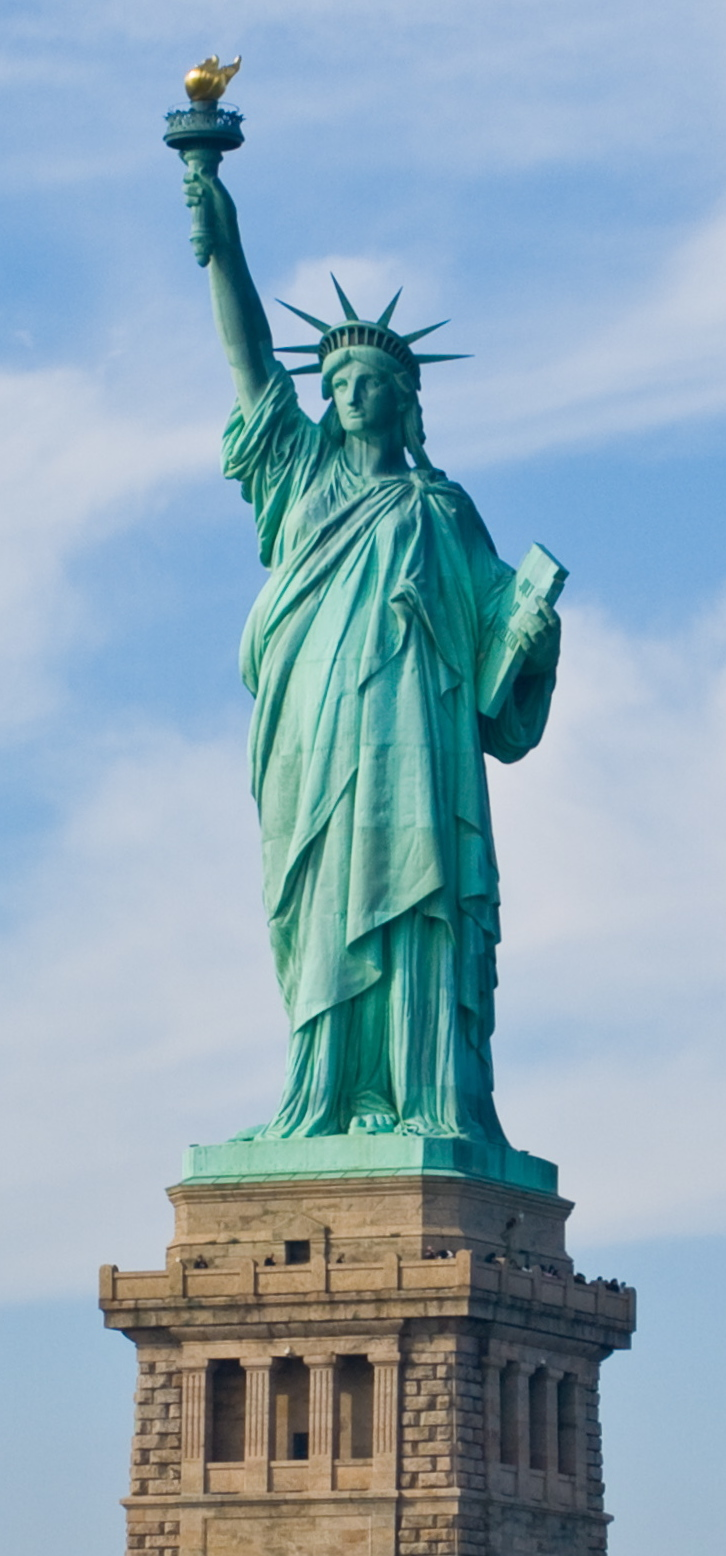
The Statue of Liberty, a symbol of Western values

Western values refer to the set of social, political, and philosophical principles that have developed in the Western world, particularly in Europe and North America, and have influenced global culture, governance, and ethics. These values, while diverse and evolving, are rooted in traditions from Greco-Roman antiquity, Judeo-Christian ethics, the Enlightenment, and modern liberal democracy. They generally posit the importance of an individualistic culture, and since the 20th century they have become marked by other sociopolitical aspects of the West, such as free-market capitalism, feminism, liberal democracy, the scientific method, and the legacy of the sexual revolution.

== Historical origins ==
Western values have been shaped by a variety of historical influences:

- Ancient Greece and Rome: The foundations of democracy, republican governance, and philosophy were laid by thinkers such as Socrates, Plato, Aristotle and institutions like the Roman Republic. Ideas such as citizenship, civic duty, and rational inquiry emerged from these civilizations.
- Judeo-Christian Tradition: The moral and ethical framework of the Western world has been deeply influenced by Judaism and Christianity, emphasizing concepts such as individual dignity, moral responsibility, and the sanctity of life.
- The Renaissance and Reformation: These movements emphasized humanism, individualism, and critical thinking, challenging traditional authorities and promoting education and scientific inquiry.
- The Enlightenment: The 17th and 18th centuries saw the rise of reason, secularism, and ideas about natural rights and political liberty. Thinkers such as John Locke, Voltaire, and Immanuel Kant argued for freedom, democracy, and human equality.
- Modern Liberal Democracy: The American and French Revolutions helped establish principles such as constitutional government, separation of powers, and universal human rights, which remain central to Western political thought today.

== Core principles ==
While Western values are not monolithic, several key principles are commonly associated with them:

- Individual liberty: Emphasizing personal freedom in thought, speech, and action, with limitations only to prevent harm to others (as articulated by thinkers like John Stuart Mill).
- Democracy and rule of law: Advocating for representative governance, accountability, and legal frameworks which apply equally to all citizens.
- Human rights and equality: Upholding inherent rights such as freedom of speech, religion, and equal treatment under the law.
- Secularism and religious freedom: Supporting the separation of church and state, allowing for both religious expression and non-religious perspectives.
- Rationalism and scientific inquiry: Encouraging critical thinking, empirical evidence, and technological progress.
- Capitalism and market economies: Promoting economic freedom, private property, and innovation through competitive markets.

== Global influence ==
Western values were historically adopted around the world in large part due to colonialism and post-colonial dominance by the West, and are influential in the discourse around and justification of these phenomena. This has induced some opposition to Western values and spurred a search for alternative values in some countries, though Western values are argued by some to have underpinned non-Western peoples' quest for human rights, and to be more global in character than often assumed. The World wars forced the West to introspect on its application of its values to itself, as internal warfare and the rise of the Nazis within Europe, who openly opposed Western values, had greatly weakened it; after World War II and the start of the post-colonial era, global institutions such as the United Nations were founded with a basis in Western values.

Western values have been used to explain a variety of phenomena relating to the global dominance and success of the West, such as the emergence of modern science and technology. They have been disseminated around the world through several mediums, such as through the spread of Western sports. The global esteem which Western values are held in has led to them being adopted by many countries, which some consider to be leading to a harmful decline of non-Western cultures and values.

== Criticism and debate ==
A constant theme of debate around Western values has been around their universal applicability or lack thereof; in modern times, as various non-Western nations have risen, they have sought to oppose certain Western values, with even Western countries also backing down to some extent from championing these values in what some see as a contested transition to a post-Western era of the world. Western values are also often contrasted with Asian values of the East, which among other factors highly posit communitarianism and a deference to authority instead. Within the West, Peter Harrison has argued that Western morality has historically been centered more around virtue than values, and that it has been in constant dialogue with standards of morality from both the past and other civilizations.

The adoption of Western values among immigrants to the West has also been scrutinized, with some Westerners opposing immigration from the Muslim world or other parts of the non-West due to a perceived incompatibility of values; others support immigration on the basis of multiculturalism.

== See also ==
- Natural law
- European values
- Western education
- Westphalian system – Concept of the sovereignty of nation-states
