= Immigration to Bangladesh =

The UN estimates that there are around 2.1 million immigrants in Bangladesh as of 2020, roughly half of which are Rohingya refugees.

== History ==
=== Ancient era ===
Bengal was historically one of the most immigrated-to regions of the Indian subcontinent, with the Bengali people having a significant ethnic admixture of several groups. Several invasions coming through northwestern India contributed to Bengal's demographics.

=== Contemporary era ===
Some people internally migrated to Bangladesh from Pakistan before the 1971 split of the two countries. Afterwards, some of these "stranded Pakistanis", often known as "Biharis", ended up in refugee camps in Bangladesh, with only 200,000 of them (less than half) taken back by Pakistan after the 1973 Delhi Agreement.

Rohingya refugees have come to Bangladesh in significant numbers due to conflicts in Myanmar.
