= Australians =

People who are born in Australia

- Flag of Australia

Total population
- 26,518,400 in Australia (2023) Map of the Australian diaspora

Regions with significant populations
- Australian diaspora: 577,255 (2019)
- United Kingdom: 165,000 (2021)
- Greece: 135,000
- United States: 100,000 (2019)
- New Zealand: 86,322 (2023)
- Italy: 30,000 (2002)
- Vietnam: 22,000 (2013)
- Canada: 21,115 (2016)
- Singapore: 20,000 (2012)
- Thailand: 20,000 (2008)
- United Arab Emirates: 16,000 (2015)
- South Korea: 15,222 (2019)
- Hong Kong: 14,669 (2016); 100,000
- Germany: 13,600 (2020)
- Mainland China: 13,286 (2010)
- Turkey: 13,286 (2010)
- Malta: 13,000
- Japan: 12,024 (2019)
- Netherlands: 12,000
- Indonesia: 11,000
- France: 10,000
- Spain: 9,000
- Papua New Guinea: 9,000
- Ireland: 8,000
- Switzerland: 7,000
- South Africa: 6,000
- Sweden: 5,000
- Malaysia: 5,000 (2025)
- Brazil: 4,607 (2025)
- Denmark: 4,000
- Saudi Arabia: 4,000
- India: 3,000 - 4,000
- Philippines: 3,360
- Qatar: 3,100
- Austria: 3,000
- Israel: 3,000
- Cyprus: 3,000
- Belgium: 2,000
- Fiji: 2,000
- Norway: 1,917
- Finland: 1,402
- Portugal: 1,400 (2020)
- Poland: 1,000
- Hungary: 1,000
- Czech Republic: 1,000
- Serbia: 1,000
- Croatia: 1,000
- Peru: 1,000
- Libya: 1,000
- Brunei: 1,000

Languages
- English; also Australian Aboriginal languages; Auslan; and other minority languages, including; Mandarin; Arabic; Cantonese; Vietnamese; Italian; Greek; Hindi; Bengali; Spanish; Punjabi

Religion
- Christianity (Catholicism, Anglicanism and other denominations), various non-Christian religions, Australian Aboriginal religion and irreligion (Note: The ABS gives the following "Explanatory Information" regarding census interpretation of irreligion: "'No religion' is equivalent to 'Secular Beliefs and Other Spiritual Beliefs and No Religious Affiliation'. For further details, see the Census of Population and Housing: Census Dictionary (cat. no. 2901.0)")

Australians, colloquially known as Aussies, are the citizens, nationals and individuals associated with the country Australia. This connection may be residential, legal, historical or ethno-cultural. For most Australians, several (or all) of these connections exist and are collectively the source of their being Australian. The country's law does not provide for any racial or ethnic component of nationality, instead relying on citizenship to define one as an Australian. In early colonial times, the term was primarily used for the native-born children of British and European settlers and convicts, before later broadening in scope. Since the postwar period, Australia has pursued an official policy of multiculturalism; it has the world's eighth-largest migrant population, with immigrants accounting for 30 percent of the population in 2019. Australian culture is of primarily Western origins, and is derived from its British, Indigenous and migrant components.

Between European colonisation in 1788 and the Second World War, the vast majority of settlers and immigrants came from the British Isles, although there was significant immigration from China and Germany during the 19th century. Many early settlements were initially penal colonies to house transported convicts. Immigration increased steadily, with an explosion of population in the 1850s following a series of gold rushes.

In the decades immediately following the Second World War, Australia received a large wave of immigration from across Europe, with many more immigrants arriving from Southern and Eastern Europe than in previous decades. Since the late 1970s, following the end of the White Australia policy in 1973, a large and continuing wave of immigration to Australia from around the world has continued into the 21st century, with Asia now being the largest source of immigrants. A smaller proportion of Australians are descended from its indigenous peoples, comprising Aboriginal Australians and Torres Strait Islanders.

The development of a distinctive Australian identity and national character began in the 19th century. The primary language is Australian English. Australia is home to a diversity of cultures, a result of its history of immigration. Since 1788, Australian culture has primarily been a Western culture, strongly influenced by early Anglo-Celtic settlers. The cultural divergence and evolution that has occurred over the centuries since European settlement has resulted in a distinctive identity.

As the Asian Australian population continues to expand and flourish as a result of changes in the demographic makeup of immigrants, and as there has been increased economic and cultural intercourse with Asian nations, Australia has observed the gradual emergence of a "Eurasian society" within its major urban hubs, blending both European and Asian material and popular culture within a distinctly Australian context. Other influences include Australian Aboriginal culture, traditions brought to the country by waves of immigration from around the world, and the culture of the United States.

== History ==
The first human inhabitants and the ancestors of the Indigenous Australians migrated to the Australian continent from Asia approximately 50,000 to 65,000 years ago, traversing the open ocean to arrive at the ancient landmass known as Sahul. It is probable that they utilized canoes or rafts to travel between the islands of Southeast Asia.

Prior to British settlement, Australian Aboriginals were nomadic, frequently traveling over extensive distances, and primarily relied on a mix of hunting, gathering, and fishing. Their social structure was intricate, deeply connected to the land, and intertwined with beliefs about the spiritual realm. Following 1788, these ways of life started to transform or disappear as Australian Aboriginals were forced to compete with settlers. Conflict, fuelled alternatively by misunderstanding and prejudice, saw indigenous people subjugated, with some being killed and others forcibly removed from their traditional territories. The spread of European-borne diseases led to significantly elevated mortality rates.

The Colony of New South Wales was established by the Kingdom of Great Britain in 1788, with the arrival of the First Fleet, and five other colonies were established in the 19th century, now forming the six present-day Australian states. Large-scale immigration occurred following a series of gold rushes in the 1850s and after the First and Second World Wars, with many post-World War II migrants coming from Southern Europe, Eastern Europe and The Middle East. Since the end of the White Australia policy in 1973, immigrants to Australia have come from around the world, and from Asia in particular.

The predominance of the English language, the existence of a parliamentary system of government drawing upon the Westminster system, constitutional monarchy, American constitutionalist and federalist traditions, Christianity as the dominant religion, and the popularity of sports including Australian Football, cricket, rugby football and tennis are evidence of a significant British heritage. As a result of many shared linguistic, historical, cultural and geographic characteristics, Australians have often identified closely with New Zealanders in particular. Australian citizenship prior to 1949 was a social, moral, and political concept. Prior to the introduction of Australian citizenship, Australians had the status of "British subjects". The High Court of Australia in Potter v Minahan (1908) stated that "Although there is no Australian nationality as distinguished from British nationality, there is an Australian species of British nationality."

== Ancestries ==
The Australian Bureau of Statistics does not collect data on race, but asks each Australian resident to nominate up to two ancestries each census. These ancestry responses are classified into broad standardised ancestry groups. At the 2021 census, the number of ancestry responses within each standardised group as a proportion of the total population was as follows: 57.2% European (including 46% North-West European and 11.2% Southern and Eastern European), 33.8% (including 29.9% Australian) Oceanian (Note: Includes those who nominate "Australian" as their ancestry. The Australian Bureau of Statistics has stated that most who nominate "Australian" as their ancestry have at least partial Anglo-Celtic European ancestry.), 17.4% Asian (including 6.5% Southern and Central Asian, 6.4% North-East Asian, and 4.5% South-East Asian), 3.2% North African and Middle Eastern, 1.4% Peoples of the Americas, and 1.3% Sub-Saharan African. At the 2021 census, the most commonly nominated individual ancestries as a proportion of the total population were:

- English (33%)
- Australian (29.9%) (Note: The Australian Bureau of Statistics has stated that most who nominate "Australian" as their ancestry have at least partial Anglo-Celtic ancestry.)
- Irish (9.5%)
- Scottish (8.6%)
- Chinese (5.5%)
- Italian (4.4%)
- German (4%)
- Aboriginal (3.8%) (Note: Those who nominated their ancestry as "Australian Aboriginal". Does not include Torres Strait Islanders. This relates to nomination of ancestry and is distinct from persons who identify as Indigenous (Aboriginal or Torres Strait Islander) which is a separate question.)
- Indian (3.1%)
- Greek (1.7%)
- Filipino (1.6%)

=== European Australians ===
European Australians are Australians of whose descent is wholly or partially European. Australians of European descent are the majority in Australia, with the number of ancestry responses categorised within the European groups as a proportion of the total population amounting to 57.2% (including 46% North-West European and 11.2% Southern and Eastern European). The proportion of Australians with European ancestry is thought to be higher than the numbers captured in the census as those nominating their ancestry as "Australian" are classified within the Oceanian group, and the Australian Bureau of Statistics has stated that most who nominate "Australian" as their ancestry are Anglo-Celtic Australians. Since soon after the beginning of British settlement in 1788, people of European descent have formed the majority of the population in Australia.

The largest statistical grouping of European Australians are Anglo-Celtic Australians, Australians whose ancestors originate wholly or partially in the British Isles. This includes English Australians, Irish Australians, Scottish Australians and Welsh Australians. Anglo-Celtic Australians have been highly influential in shaping the nation's character. By the mid-1840s, the numbers of freeborn settlers had overtaken the convict population. Although some observers stress Australia's convict history, the vast majority of early settlers came of their own free will. Far more Australians are descended from assisted immigrants than from convicts, the majority of Colonial Era settlers being British and Irish. About 20 percent of Australians are descendants of convicts. Most of the first Australian settlers came from London, the Midlands and the North of England, and Ireland.

Settlers that arrived throughout the 19th century were from all parts of the United Kingdom and Ireland, a significant proportion of settlers came from the Southwest and Southeast of England, from Ireland and from Scotland. In 1888, 60 percent of the Australian population had been born in Australia, and almost all had British ancestral origins. Out of the remaining 40 percent, 34 percent had been born in the British Isles, and 6 percent were of European origin, mainly from Germany and Scandinavia. The census of 1901 showed that 98 percent of Australians had Anglo-Celtic ancestral origins. In 1939 and 1945, still 98 percent of Australians had Anglo-Celtic ancestral origins. Until 1947, the vast majority of the population were of British origin.

Germans formed the largest non-British Isles ancestry for most of the 19th century. Between 1901 and 1940, 140,000 non-British European immigrants arrived in Australia (about 16 percent of the total intake). Before World War II, 13.6 percent were born overseas, and 80 percent of those were British. Following the Second World War, large numbers of continental Europeans immigrated to Australia, with Italian Australians and Greek Australians being among the largest immigrant groups during the post-war era. During the 1950s, Australia was the destination of 30 per cent of Dutch emigrants and the Netherlands-born became numerically the second largest non-British group in Australia. In 1971, 70 percent of the foreign born were of European origin.

Italian Australians are Australians of Italian ancestry, and comprise the largest non Anglo-Celtic European ethnic group in Australia, with the 2021 census finding 4.4% of the population claiming ancestry from Italy be they migrants to Australia or their descendants born in Australia of Italian heritage. Australia's long-history of Italian immigration has given rise to an Italo-Australian dialect of the Italian language. German Australians are Australians of German ancestry. The German community constitutes the second largest non-Anglo Celtic European ethnic group in Australia, amounting to 4% of respondents in the 2021 Census. Germans formed the largest non-English-speaking group in Australia up to the 20th century. Although a few individuals had emigrated earlier, the first large group of Germans arrived in South Australia 1838, not long after the British colonisation of South Australia.

=== Asian Australians ===
Asian Australians are Australians with ancestry wholly or partially from the continent of Asia. At the 2021 census, the number of ancestry responses categorised within the Asian groups as a proportion of the total population amounted to 17.4% (including 6.5% Southern and Central Asian, 6.4% North-East Asian, and 4.5% South-East Asian). This figure excludes Australians of Middle Eastern ancestry, who are separately categorised within the North African and Middle Eastern group.

Chinese Australians are Australians of Chinese ancestry, forming the single largest non Anglo-Celtic ancestry in the country, constituting 5.5% of those nominating their ancestry at the 2021 census. Chinese Australians are one of the largest groups of Overseas Chinese people, forming the largest Overseas Chinese community in Oceania, and are the largest Asian-Australian community. Per capita, Australia has more people of Chinese ancestry than any country outside Asia. Many Chinese Australians have immigrated from mainland China, Hong Kong, Macau, and Taiwan as well as Indonesia, Malaysia, Singapore and the Philippines, while many are descendants of such immigrants. The very early history of Chinese Australians involved significant immigration from villages of the Pearl River Delta in Southern China.

More recent Chinese migrants include those from Mandarin and other Chinese dialects or forms. Less well-known are the kinds of society Chinese Australians came from, the families they left behind and what their intentions were in migrating. Gold rushes lured many Chinese to the Australian colonies. From the mid-19th century, Chinese dubbed Australia the New Gold Mountain after the Gold Mountain of California in North America. They typically sent money to their families in the villages, regularly visited their families, and retired to their home villages after many years working as market gardeners, shopkeepers or cabinet-makers. As with many overseas Chinese groups the world over, early Chinese immigrants to Australia established several Chinatowns in major cities, such as Sydney (Chinatown, Sydney), Melbourne (Chinatown, Melbourne, since the 1850s) and Brisbane (Chinatown, Brisbane), Perth (Chinatown, Perth), as well as in regional towns associated with the goldfields such as Cairns (Cairns Chinatown).

Indian Australians are Australians of Indian ancestry, and are the second-largest Asian Australian ancestry, comprising 3.1% of the total population. Indian Australians are one of the largest groups within the Indian diaspora. Indians are the youngest average age (34 years) and the fastest growing community both in terms of absolute numbers and percentages in Australia. Migration of Indians to Australia followed the pattern of "from 18th-century sepoys and lascars (soldiers and sailors) aboard visiting European ships, through 19th-century migrant labourers and the 20th century's hostile policies to the new generation of skilled professional migrants of the 21st century... India became the largest source of skilled migrants in the 21st century."

=== Indigenous Australians ===
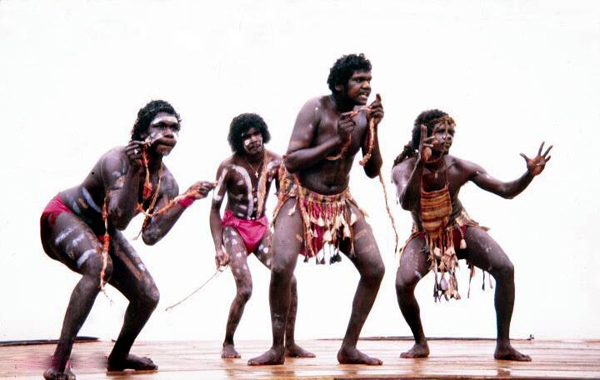
Aboriginal Australians, 1981

Australian Aboriginal flag

Indigenous Australians are descendants of the original inhabitants of the Australian continent. Their ancestors are believed to have migrated from Africa to Asia around 70,000 years ago and arrived in Australia around 50,000 years ago. The Torres Strait Islanders are a distinct people of Melanesian ancestry, indigenous to the Torres Strait Islands, which are at the northernmost tip of Queensland near Papua New Guinea, and some nearby settlements on the mainland. The term "Aboriginal" is traditionally applied to only the indigenous inhabitants of mainland Australia and Tasmania, along with some of the adjacent islands. Indigenous Australians is an inclusive term used when referring to both Aboriginal and Torres Strait islanders (the "first peoples").

Dispersing across the Australian continent over time, the population expanded and differentiated into hundreds of distinct groups, each with its own language and culture. More than 400 distinct Australian Aboriginal peoples have been identified across the continent, distinguished by unique names designating their ancestral languages, dialects, or distinctive speech patterns.

In 1770, fearing he had been pre-empted by the French, James Cook changed a hilltop signal-drill on Possession Island in Torres Strait, into a possession ceremony, fabricating Britain's claim of Australia's east coast. Eighteen years later, the east coast was occupied by Britain and later the west coast was also settled by Britain. At that time, the indigenous population was estimated to have been between 315,000 and 750,000.

At the 2021 census, 3.2% of the Australian population identified as being Indigenous — Aboriginal Australians and Torres Strait Islanders. (Note: Indigenous identification is separate to the ancestry question on the Australian Census and persons identifying as Aboriginal or Torres Strait Islander may identify any ancestry.) Indigenous Australians experience higher than average rates of imprisonment and unemployment, lower levels of education, and life expectancies for males and females that are, respectively, 11 and 17 years lower than those of non-indigenous Australians. Some remote Indigenous communities have been described as having "failed state"-like conditions.

== Country of birth ==
In 2019, 30% of the Australian resident population, or 7,529,570 people, were born overseas. The following table shows Australia's population by country of birth as estimated by the Australian Bureau of Statistics in 2021. It shows only countries or regions or birth with a population of over 100,000 residing in Australia (for more information about immigration see Immigration to Australia and Foreign-born population of Australia):

Source: Australian Bureau of Statistics (2021)
Place of birth	Estimated resident population (Note: Only countries with 100,000 or more are listed here.)
Total Australian-born	18,235,690
Total foreign-born	7,502,450
(United Kingdom) England, Scotland, Wales and Northern Ireland (Note: The Australian Bureau of Statistics source lists England, Scotland, Wales and Northern Ireland separately although they are all part of the United Kingdom. They are not combined because they are not combined in the source.)	967,390
India	710,380
China (Note: In accordance with the Australian Bureau of Statistics source, Mainland China, Taiwan and the Special Administrative Regions of Hong Kong and Macau are listed separately.)	595,630
New Zealand	559,980
Philippines	310,620
Vietnam	268,170
South Africa	201,930
Malaysia	172,250
Italy	171,520
Sri Lanka	145,790
Scotland (Note: The Australian Bureau of Statistics source lists England and Scotland separately although they are both part of the United Kingdom. These should not be combined as they are not combined in the source.)	130,060
Nepal	129,870
United States	109,450
Germany	107,940
South Korea	106,560
Hong Kong (Note: In accordance with the Australian Bureau of Statistics source, Mainland China, Taiwan and the Special Administrative Regions of Hong Kong and Macau are listed separately.)	104,990
Greece	100,650

== Language ==
Although Australia has no official language, English has always been entrenched as the de facto national language. Australian English is a major variety of the language with a distinctive accent and lexicon, and differs slightly from other varieties of English in grammar and spelling. General Australian serves as the standard dialect.

At the 2021 census, English was the only language spoken in the home for 72% of the population. The next most common languages spoken at home are Mandarin (2.7%), Arabic (1.4%), Vietnamese (1.3%), Cantonese (1.2%) and Punjabi (0.9%). Over 250 Indigenous Australian languages are thought to have existed at the time of first European contact, of which fewer than twenty are still in daily use by all age groups. About 110 others are spoken exclusively by older people. At the time of the 2006 census, 52,000 Indigenous Australians, representing 12% of the Indigenous population, reported that they spoke an Indigenous language at home. Australia has a sign language known as Auslan, which is the main language of about 10,112 deaf people who reported that they use Auslan language at home in the 2016 census.

== Religion ==
Australia has no official religion; its Constitution prohibits the Commonwealth government, but not the states, from establishing one, or interfering with the freedom of religion. The Constitutional writers held that the Australian community was a Christian community and that Christianity was a portion of the English constitution that the colonists brought with them; the Commonwealth would in practice reflect Christianity regardless of whether explicit religious wording was included, while they also were concerned that unless prohibited the federal government might legislate on religious matters. Sir John Downer stated:

For my own part, I think it is of little moment whether the words are inserted or not. The piety in us must be in our hearts rather than on our lips. Whether the words are inserted or not, I think they will have no meaning, and will have no effect in extending the power of the Commonwealth; because the Commonwealth will from its first stage be a Christian Commonwealth, and, unless its powers are expressly limited, may legislate on religious questions in a way that we now little dream of.

Secularisation in Australia like in other Western nations has accelerated since the 19th and 20th century. Between 1993 and 2022, the proportion of the population identifying religion as very or somewhat important in life declined from 48% to 29% respectively per Our World In Data Survey Metric (see Religion has become less important in some English speaking countries). At the 2021 Census, 38.9% of the population identified as having "no religion", up from 15.5% in 2001. The largest religion is Christianity (43.9% of the population) down from 88% in the 1966 census and 96% from the 1911 census. The largest Christian denominations are the Roman Catholic Church (20% of the population) and the Anglican Church of Australia (9.8%). Multicultural immigration since the Second World War has led to the growth of non-Christian religions, the largest of which are Islam (3.2%), Hinduism (2.7%), Buddhism (2.4%), Sikhism (0.8%), and Judaism (0.4%).

In 2021, just under 8,000 people declared an affiliation with traditional Aboriginal religions. According to Australian Aboriginal mythology and the animist framework developed in Aboriginal Australia, the Dreaming is a sacred era in which ancestral totemic spirit beings formed The Creation. The Dreaming established the laws and structures of society and the ceremonies performed to ensure continuity of life and land.

== Population ==
The current Australian resident population is estimated at 28,718,000 (22 November 2026). This does not include Australians living overseas. In 2015, 2.15% of the Australian population lived overseas, one of the lowest proportions worldwide. This ratio is much lower than many other countries in the Organisation for Economic Co-operation and Development (an intergovernmental organisation with 38 member developed countries).

=== Historical population ===
The data in the table is sourced from the Australian Bureau of Statistics. The population estimates do not include the Aboriginal population before 1961. Estimates of Aboriginal population prior to European settlement range from 300,000 to one million, with archaeological finds indicating a sustainable population of around 750,000.

Crown colonies (Pre-Federation)
Year	Population	Year	Population
1788	859	1848	332,328
1798	4,588	1858	1,050,828
1808	10,263	1868	1,539,552
1818	25,859	1878	2,092,164
1828	58,197	1888	2,981,677
1838	151,868	1898	3,664,715

Year	Population	% change
1901	3,788,123	–
1906	4,059,083	7.2
1911	4,489,545	10.6
1916	4,943,173	10.1
1921	5,455,136	10.4
1926	6,056,360	11.0
1931	6,526,485	7.8
1936	6,778,372	3.4

Year	Population	% change
1941	7,109,898	4.9
1946	7,465,157	5.0
1951	8,421,775	12.8
1956	9,425,563	11.9
1961	10,548,267	11.9
1966	11,599,498	10.0
1971	13,067,265	12.7
1976	14,033,083	7.4

Year	Population	% change
1981	14,923,260	6.3
1986	16,018,350	7.3
1991	17,284,036	12.8
1996	18,310,714	5.9
2001	19,413,240	6.0
2006	20,848,760	7.4
2011	21,507,717	3.2
2014 (estimate)	23,500,000	9.3

== See also ==
- Category:Australian diaspora
- List of prime ministers of Australia
