= Welsh New Zealanders =

Seland Newydd Cymreig (Welsh)

Total population
- 3,705 (by ancestry, 2013); 6,708 (by birth, 2013)

Regions with significant populations
- Auckland

Languages
- English, Welsh

Religion
- Christianity (Methodism, Presbyterianism), Irreligion

Related ethnic groups
- Scottish New Zealanders, Welsh Australians

Welsh New Zealanders refers to New Zealand-born people who trace their ancestry back to Wales or Welsh people who emigrated to New Zealand and became naturalised citizens.

The Welsh, unlike other migrant groups from the British Isles, are not as numerous as their Welsh Australian counterparts. However, their contribution was notable. Many Welshmen who arrived in New Zealand were gold and coal miners.

== History ==
The Welsh were among the earliest British settlers to arrive in New Zealand, as sealers and whaler

== Welsh place names in New Zealand ==
Some of the Welsh-derived place names in New Zealand include:

Brynavon, Northland

Brynderwyn, Northland

Bryndwr, Christchurch

Cambrians, Otago - Named after the Welsh prospectors.

Cardiff, Taranaki - Named after Cardiff in Glamorganshire.

Carnarvon, now Himatangi

Hawarden, Canterbury - Named after Hawarden Castle in Flintshire.

Lake Pembroke, now Lake Wānaka

Marchwiel, Canterbury - Named after Marchwiel in Denbighshire.

Milford Sound - Originally Milford Haven, it was named by the Welsh navigator John Grono after Milford Haven in Pembrokeshire.

Morgans Valley, Christchurch - Named after a Welsh settler.

Pembroke, Taranaki - Named after Pembroke in Pembrokeshire.

Picton, Marlborough - Named after Welsh General Sir Thomas Picton.

Rees River, Otago - Named after William Gilbert Rees, Welsh founder of Queenstown.

Welshmans Creek, Southland - Named after a Welsh prospector.

== See also ==
- European New Zealanders
- Europeans in Oceania
- Immigration to New Zealand
- Pākehā
