= English Australians =

Australians of English birth or descent

Total population
- 8,385,928 (by ancestry, 2021 census) (33% of the Australian population); 927,490 (England born, 2021 census) 36% of the Australian population

Regions with significant populations
- All states and territories of Australia

Languages
- English (English and Australian)

Religion
- Christianity; Anglicanism; Catholicism; Irreligion

Related ethnic groups
- Anglo-Celtic Australians, Scottish Australians, Irish Australians, Welsh Australians, Cornish Australians

English Australians, also known as Anglo-Australians, are Australians whose ancestry originates wholly or partly in England. In the 2021 census, 8,385,928 people, or 33% of the Australian population, stated that they had English ancestry (whether sole or partial). It is the largest self-identified ancestry in Australia. People of ethnic English origin have been the largest group to migrate to Australia since the establishment of the Colony of New South Wales in 1788.

English Australians are a subset of Anglo-Celtic Australians, who are themselves a subset of European Australians. Other subsets of Anglo-Celtic Australians (that is, Australians with ancestry originating in the British Isles) include Irish Australians, Scottish Australians and Welsh Australians. There is a tendency to refer to these ancestries collectively due to their long history in Australia and the high degree of intermixture which has occurred over centuries. In light of this history, there is a tendency for Australians with English or other Anglo-Celtic ancestries to simply identify their ancestry as 'Australian'.

Many of English Australians (who may simply describe themselves as "nth generation Australian") are descended from convicts and other early colonists; South Australia is the only state not founded as a British penal colony. However, many are descendants of the 12 pound poms and other immigrants

== History ==
=== 18th and 19th centuries ===
Population born in England New South Wales 1846-1891
Year	Population	Ref(s)
1851	51,122	
1861	84,152	
1871	87,334	
1881	107,574	
1891	149,232	

New South Wales was established in 1788 by the British government as a penal colony. Visitors described the English character of Sydney for at least the first 50 years after 1788, noting the traditional English appearance of the churches overlooking the convict barracks. First-generation colonial Sydney residents were predominantly English. 160,000 convicts came to Australia between 1788 and 1850. Between 1788 and 1840, 80,000 English convicts were transported to New South Wales, with the greatest numbers coming between 1825 and 1835. The New South Wales Census of 1846 accounted for 57,349 born in England, 47,547 born in Ireland and 14,406 born in Scotland. Until 1859, 2.2 million (73%) of the free settlers who immigrated were British in origin.

Many more English people immigrated to Victoria by the gold rush of the 1850s. By 1854 there were 97,943 English-born people in Victoria. Immigration policies and assistance schemes helped maintain high levels of immigration from England. Of the 1 million immigrants who arrived between 1860 and 1900, just over half came from England.

Between 1840 and 1870 there were more Irish than English assisted migrants which did not change until the 1870s, when there were more English.

At least 75 per cent of all overseas-born people in Australia during the 19th century were from the British Isles. The proportion who had been born in England or Wales remained quite stable (at about 47 per cent) from 1861 to 1911, as did the proportion born in Scotland (about 12 per cent).

English settlers more often came from the South than the North of England.

=== Post-Federation English immigration ===
Population born in England, 1911–present
Year	Population	Ref(s)
1911	346,030	
1921	446,124	
1933	486,831	
1947	381,592	
1954	478,411	
1961	556,478	
1971	842,032	
1981	889,124	
1991	896,336	
2001	847,365	
2011	911,593	
2021	927,490	

2021
1. No religion (46.4%)
2. Anglicanism (29.9%)
3. Catholicism (10.4%)
4. Not stated (2.50%)
5. Uniting Church (1.70%)
6. Other Christian (9.00%)

Australians of English ancestry made up more than 50 percent of the population at the time of Federation (1901). From 1922 the Empire Settlement Act assisted thousands of migrants from England. After the Second World War, even as immigration from other countries expanded dramatically, English citizens had almost unrestricted entry into Australia. Arthur Calwell, Minister for Immigration, wanted nine out of ten new immigrants to be UK-born. The majority of England-born migrants received assisted passages until the scheme was abolished in 1982.

Among the notable English-born were politicians such as Henry Parkes, and Joseph Cook; in retailing and media: John Norton, Anthony Hordern and John Fairfax.

Surges of English immigration in the 1910s, 1920s, 1950s and 1960s sustained the English-born as the largest single immigrant group throughout the 20th century. In 1978 Australians of predominantly English ancestry made up over 45 per cent of the population. English ancestry was reported by 6.6 million people (46%) in 1986, and 6.4 million (37%) in 2001. While the English-born continue to be well-represented among immigrants to Australia, the overall decline of English immigration to Australia since the 1980s has meant that the English-born are declining as a proportion of immigrants to Australia. Regardless, Australian society continues to be influenced by its strong English heritage.

== Demographics ==
English Total Responses as a fraction of total persons, in Inner Sydney, Australia, according to the 2011 census results.

In the 2021 census, 8,385,928 people, or 33% of the Australian population, stated that they had English ancestry (whether wholly or partial).

Year	Population	%	Population change	% change	Ref(s)
1986	6,607,228	42.3	Steady	Steady	
2001	6,358,880	33.9	▼248,348	▼	
2006	6,283,647	31.6	▼75,233	▼	
2011	7,238,533	33.7	▲954,886	▲	
2016	7,852,224	36.1	▲613,691	▲	
2021	8,385,928	33.0	▲533,704	▼	

English Australian demography by religion (it includes only English born in England and not australian with an english background)
Religious group	2021 (Note: Religious breakdown proportions based on "English" ethnic or cultural origin response on the 2021 census.)		2016 (Note: Religious breakdown proportions based on "English" ethnic or cultural origin response on the 2016 census.)		2011 (Note: Religious breakdown proportions based on "English" ethnic or cultural origin response on the 2011 census.)	
Religious group	Pop.	%	Pop.	%	Pop.	%
Anglican	277,429 ▼	29.91% ▼	331,138 ▼	36.49% ▼	406,631	44.61%
Catholic	96,699 ▼	10.43% ▼	104,285 ▼	11.49% ▼	111,514	12.23%
Uniting Church	15,407 ▼	1.66% ▼	19,387 ▼	2.14% ▼	25,861	2.84%
Oriental Orthodox	308 ▲	0.03%	268 ▲	0.03% ▲	160	0.02%
Eastern Orthodox	1,888 ▲	0.2% ▲	1,736 ▼	0.19% ▼	1,779	0.2%
Other Christian denomination	52,669 ▼	5.68% ▼	58,467 ▼	6.44% ▼	59,668	6.55%
(Total Christian)	444,402▼	47.91% ▼	515,284▼	56.78%▼	605,616	66.43%
Irreligion	436,251 ▲	47.04% ▲	330,947 ▲	36.47% ▲	237,376	26.04%
Buddhism	5,127 ▼	0.55% ▼	5,872 ▼	0.65% ▼	6,691	0.73%
Hinduism	4,051 ▲	0.44% ▲	3,343 ▲	0.37% ▲	2,299	0.25%
Islam	2,560 ▲	0.28% ▲	1,880 ▲	0.21% ▲	1,715	0.19%
Judaism	3,886 ▲	0.42% ▲	3,717 ▼	0.41% ▼	4,120	0.45%
Other	4,619 ▲	0.5% ▲	4,450 ▼	0.49% ▼	5,316	0.58%
Not stated	26,592 ▼	2.87% ▼	42,072 ▼	4.64% ▼	48,465	5.32%
Total English Australian population	927,490 ▲	100%	907,568 ▼	10%	911,593	100%

English Australian demography by religion (Ancestry included)
Religious group	2021		2016		2011	
Religious group	Pop.	%	Pop.	%	Pop.	%
Anglican	1,744,672 ▼	18.73% ▼	2,110,848 ▼	24.1% ▼	2,457,756	30.16%
Catholic	1,470,489 ▼	15.79% ▼	1,605,362 ▲	18.33% ▼	1,592,195	19.54%
Uniting Church	345,618 ▼	3.71% ▼	433,139 ▼	4.94% ▼	512,743	6.29%
Oriental Orthodox	2,302 ▲	0.02%	1,834 ▲	0.02%	1,324	0.02%
Eastern Orthodox	29,443 ▲	0.32% ▲	26,481 ▲	0.3% ▲	23,821	0.29%
Other Christian denomination	767,454 ▼	8.24% ▼	847,598 ▼	9.68% ▼	848,239	10.41%
(Total Christian)	4,359,980▼	46.81% ▼	5,025,264▼	57.37%▼	5,436,068	66.7%
Irreligion	4,558,971 ▲	48.95% ▲	3,240,918 ▲	37% ▲	2,130,354	26.14%
Buddhism	54,565 ▼	0.59% ▼	60,045 ▲	0.69% ▼	58,868	0.72%
Hinduism	29,750 ▲	0.32% ▲	18,370 ▲	0.21% ▲	10,918	0.13%
Islam	43,152 ▲	0.46% ▲	30,105 ▲	0.34% ▲	21,813	0.27%
Judaism	21,314 ▲	0.23% ▲	19,429 ▲	0.22% ▼	18,959	0.23%
Other	39,167 ▲	0.42% ▲	34,695 ▼	0.4% ▼	36,333	0.45%
Not stated	206,522 ▼	2.22% ▼	330,965 ▼	3.78% ▼	346,806	4.26%
Total English Australian population	9,313,418 ▲	100%	8,759,792 ▼	100%	8,150,129	100%

== Cultural influence ==
People of English descent were by far the single most influential ethnic group in colonial Australia. The colonisation of Australia by English people is still evident in place names, Australia's common law legal system, popular dishes such as fish and chips and Sunday Roast and English as Australia's national language.

In Sydney, at least 50 suburban names are derived directly from 20 English counties, of which the largest numbers are from Kent, Surrey and London. Among the best known are Surry Hills, Croydon, Hornsby, Epping, Chipping Norton, Brighton-le-Sands, Bexley, Canterbury, Ryde, Kensington, Lewisham and Penshurst. Similar influences on place names can be seen elsewhere in Australia.

== Notable people ==
=== English convicts transported to Australia ===
- James Blackburn – known for contributions to Australian architecture and civil engineering
- William Bland – naval surgeon transported for killing a man in a duel; prospered and was involved in philanthropy; had a seat in the legislative assembly
- William Buckley – escaped and lived with Aboriginal people for many years
- John Cadman – had been a publican; as a convict became Superintendent of Boats in Sydney; Cadmans Cottage is a cottage granted to him
- Daniel Cooper – successful merchant
- Margaret Dawson – First Fleet, "founding mother"
- William Field – Tasmanian businessman and landowner
- Francis Greenway – Australian architect
- William Henry Groom – successful auctioneer and politician; served in the inaugural Australian Parliament
- William Hutchinson – public servant and pastoralist
- Mark Jeffrey – wrote famous autobiography
- Henry Kable – First Fleet convict, arrived with wife and son (Susannah Holmes, also a convict, and Henry) filed 1st lawsuit in Australia, became wealthy businessman
- Simeon Lord – pioneer merchant and magistrate in Australia
- Nathaniel Lucas – one of the first convicts on Norfolk Island, where he became Master carpenter, later farmed successfully, built windmills, and was Superintendent of carpenters in Sydney
- Isaac Nichols – entrepreneur, first Postmaster
- William Redfern – one of the few surgeon convicts
- Mary Reibey – operated a fleet of ships
- Henry Savery – Australia's first novelist; author of Quintus Servinton
- Robert Sidaway – opened Australia's first theatre
- William Sykes – historically interesting because he left a brief diary and a bundle of letters
- John Tawell – served his sentence, became a prosperous chemist, returned to England after 15 years, and after some time murdered a mistress, for which he was hanged
- Samuel Terry – wealthy merchant and philanthropist
- James Hardy Vaux – author of Australia's first full length autobiography and dictionary
- Mary Wade – youngest female convict transported to Australia (age 11); had 21 children and at the time of her death had over 300 living descendants
- Joseph Wild – explorer
- Solomon Wiseman – merchant and operated ferry on Hawkesbury River, hence town name of Wisemans Ferry

=== Prime Ministers ===
The majority of prime ministers of Australia have been of at least partial English ancestry. To date all Australian prime ministers have had whole or partial Anglo-Celtic ancestry.

1. Edmund Barton, 1st prime minister, 1901–1903 (English parents)
2. Alfred Deakin, 2nd prime minister, 1903–1904, 1905–08, 1909–10 (English parents)
3. Joseph Cook, 6th prime minister, 1913–1914 (born in Silverdale, Staffordshire, England)
4. Billy Hughes, 7th prime minister, 1915–1923 (born in London, England)
5. Earle Page, 11th prime minister, 1939 (father from London, England)
6. Robert Menzies, 12th prime minister, 1939–1941, 1949-66 (maternal grandparents born in Penzance, England)
7. Harold Holt, 17th prime minister, 1966–1967 (English descent)
8. John McEwen, 18th prime minister, 1967–1968 (partial English descent)
9. John Gorton, 19th prime minister, 1968–1971 (English father)
10. William McMahon, 20th prime minister, 1971–1972 (partial English descent)
11. Gough Whitlam, 21st prime minister, 1972–1975 (English descent)
12. Malcolm Fraser, 22nd prime minister, 1975–1983 (partial English descent)
13. Bob Hawke, 23rd prime minister, 1983–1991 (English descent; all great-grandparents born in England, seven from Cornwall, England and one from Cheshire, England)
14. Paul Keating, 24th prime minister, 1991–1996 (maternal English descent)
15. John Howard, 25th prime minister, 1996–2007 (partial English descent)
16. Kevin Rudd, 26th prime minister, 2007–10, 2013 (his 4th great-grandparents, convicts Thomas Rudd from London and Mary Cable from Essex, England)
17. Julia Gillard, 27th prime minister, 2010–2013 (paternal grandparents born in England)
18. Tony Abbott, 28th prime minister, 2013–2015 (English father; born in London, England of English, Dutch, Scottish and Welsh descent)
19. Malcolm Turnbull, 29th prime minister, 2015–2018 (maternal grandmother, May Lansbury (née Morle), born in England)
20. Scott Morrison, 30th prime minister, 2018 (English ancestry)

== See also ==
- Australia–United Kingdom relations
- Australian British
- European emigration
- Demographics of Australia
- Anglo-Celtic Australians
- European Australians
- White people#Australia
- Irish Australians
- Scottish Australians
- Welsh Australians
- English diaspora
- English Americans
- English Canadians
- European New Zealanders
- Immigration to Australia
- English New Zealanders
- List of locations in Australia with an English name
- English Argentines
- English Chileans
