= Welsh people =

Ethnic group native to Wales

Welsh people Cymry
- Flag of Wales

Regions with significant populations
- Wales 2 million
- Significant Welsh diaspora in
- United States: 2,000,000
- England: 610,000
- Canada: 475,000 (Includes those of mixed ancestry)
- Australia: 126,000
- Argentina: 50,000
- Scotland: 17,000
- New Zealand: 10,000
- Ireland: 10,000
- Isle of Man: 1,000

Languages
- Welsh; English; British Sign

Religion
- Wales: Predominantly Non-religious (46.5%) and Christian (43.6%), traditionally Nonconformist

Related ethnic groups
- Bretons, Cornish, Manx, English, Scottish, Irish, Ulster-Scots

The Welsh (Welsh: Cymry) are an ethnic group and nation native to Wales who share a common ancestry, history and culture. Wales is one of the four countries of the United Kingdom. The majority of people living in Wales are British citizens.

In Wales, the Welsh language (Welsh: Cymraeg) is protected by law. (Note: The Welsh language has been protected gradually and most notably by the Welsh Language Act 1967, the Welsh Language Act 1993, and the Welsh Language (Wales) Measure 2011.) Welsh remains the predominant language in many parts of Wales, particularly in North Wales and parts of West Wales, though English is the predominant language in South Wales. The Welsh language is also taught in schools in Wales; and, even in regions of Wales in which Welsh people predominantly speak English on a daily basis, the Welsh language is spoken at home among family or in informal settings, with Welsh speakers often engaging in code-switching and translanguaging. In the English-speaking areas of Wales, many Welsh people are bilingually fluent or semi-fluent in the Welsh language or, to varying degrees, capable of speaking or understanding the language at limited or conversational proficiency levels. The Welsh language is descended from Brythonic, spoken across Britain since before the Roman invasion.

In 2016, an analysis of the geography of Welsh surnames commissioned by the Welsh Government found that 718,000 people (nearly 35% of the Welsh population) have a family name of Welsh origin, compared with 5.3% in the rest of the United Kingdom, 4.7% in New Zealand, 4.1% in Australia, and 3.8% in the United States, with an estimated 16.3 million people in the countries studied having at least partial Welsh ancestry. Over 300,000 Welsh people live in London.

== Terminology ==
The names "Wales" and "Welsh" are modern descendants of the Anglo-Saxon word wealh, a descendant of the Proto-Germanic word walhaz, which was derived from the name of the Gaulish people known to the Romans as Volcae and which came to refer indiscriminately to inhabitants of the Roman Empire. The Old English-speaking Anglo-Saxons came to use the term to refer to the Britons in particular. As the Britons' territories shrank, the term came ultimately to be applied to a smaller group of people, and the plural form of Wealh, Wēalas, evolved into the name for the territory that best maintained cultural continuity with pre-Anglo-Saxon Britain: Wales. The modern names for various Romance-speaking people in Continental Europe (e.g. Wallonia, Wallachia, Valais, Vlachs, and Włochy, the Polish name for Italy) have a similar etymology.

The modern Welsh name for themselves is Cymry (plural) (singular: Cymro [m] and Cymraes [f]), and Cymru is the Welsh name for Wales. These words (both of which are pronounced [ˈkəmrɨ]) are descended from the Brythonic word kombrogi, meaning "fellow-countrymen". Thus, they carry a sense of "land of fellow-countrymen", "our country", and notions of fraternity. The use of the word Cymry as a self-designation derives from the post-Roman Era relationship of the Welsh with the Brythonic-speaking peoples of northern England and southern Scotland, the peoples of "Yr Hen Ogledd" (English: The Old North). The word came into use as a self-description probably before the 7th century. It is attested in a praise poem to Cadwallon ap Cadfan (Moliant Cadwallon, by Afan Ferddig) c. 633.

In Welsh literature, the word Cymry was used throughout the Middle Ages to describe the Welsh, though the older, more generic term Brythoniaid continued to be used to describe any of the Britonnic peoples, including the Welsh, and was the more common literary term until c. 1100. Thereafter Cymry prevailed as a reference to the Welsh. Until c. 1560 the word was spelt Kymry or Cymry, regardless of whether it referred to the people or their homeland.

== History ==
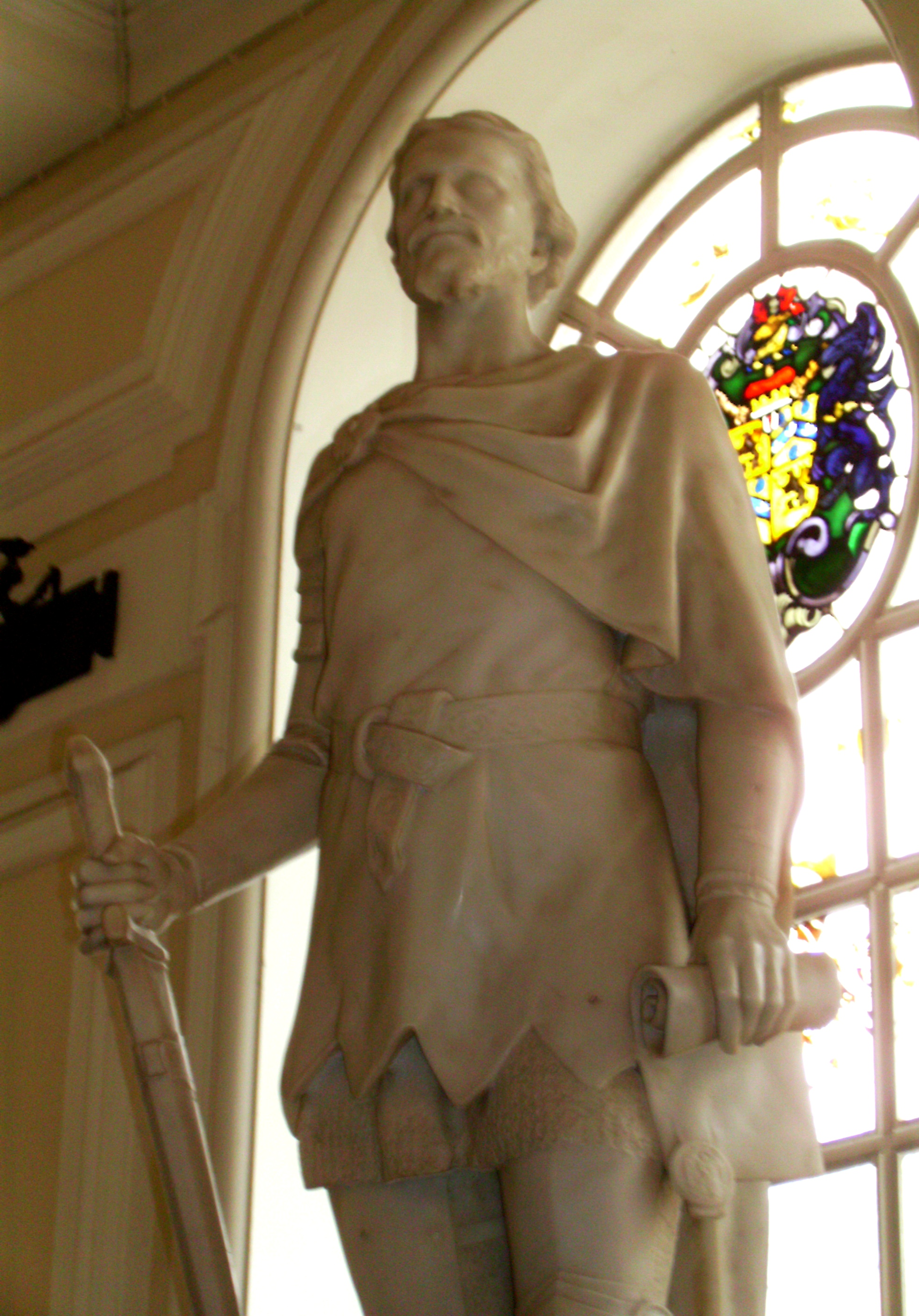
Owain Glyndŵr was proclaimed Prince of Wales by his supporters on 16 September 1400. He was the last native Welsh person to hold the title.

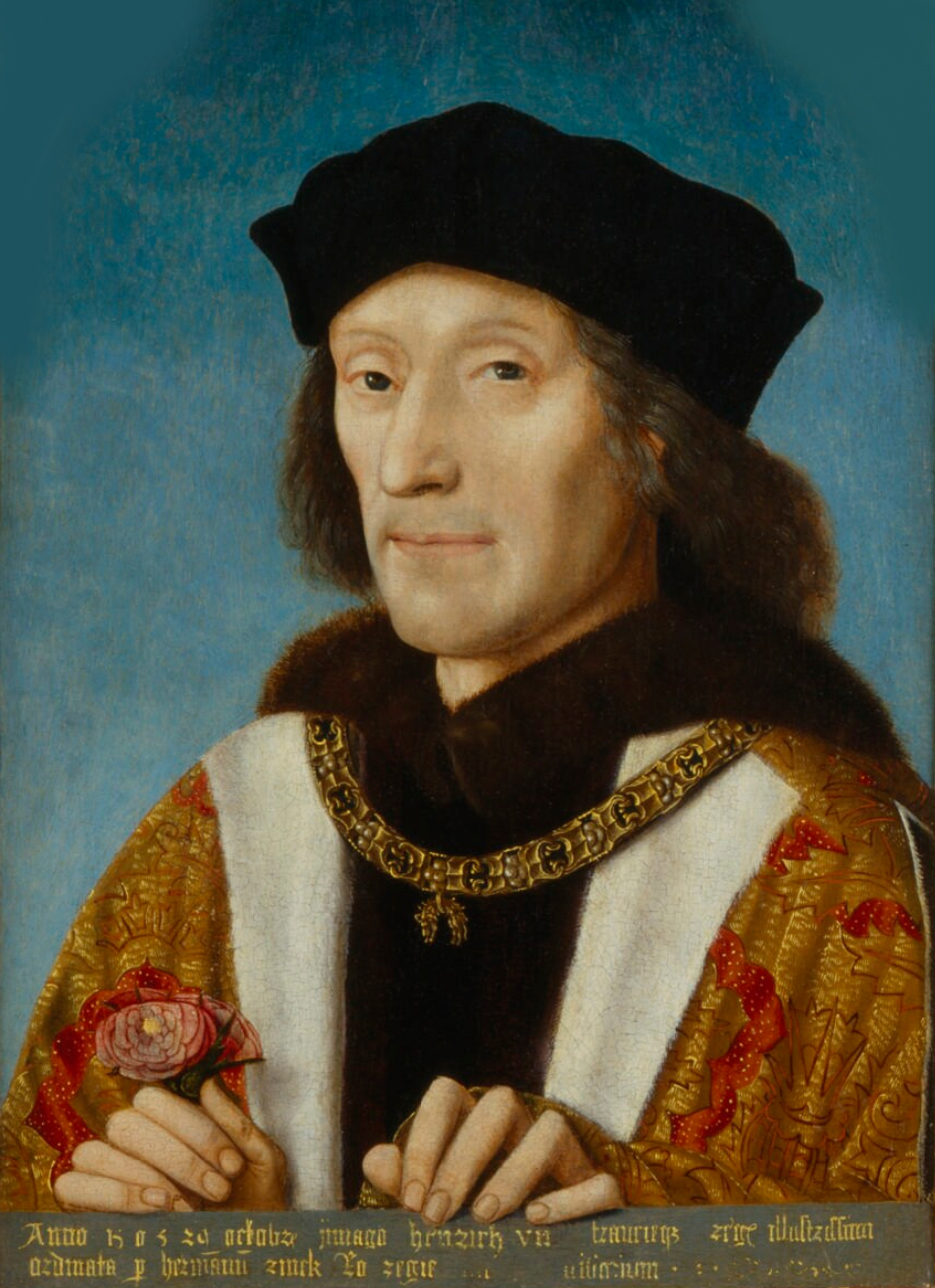
King Henry VII, the founder of the royal house of Tudor

During their time in Britain, the ancient Romans encountered tribes in present-day Wales that they called the Ordovices, the Demetae, the Silures and the Deceangli. The people of what is now Wales were not distinguished from the rest of the peoples of southern Britain; all were called Britons and spoke Common Brittonic, a Celtic language. This language, and Celtic culture more generally, seems to have arrived in Britain during the Iron Age, though some archaeologists argue that there is no evidence for large-scale Iron Age migrations into Great Britain, in which case the Celticisation of Britain would have occurred through cultural diffusion.

Most people in Wales today regard themselves as modern Celts, claiming a heritage back to the Iron Age tribes. When the Roman legions departed Britain around 400, a Romano-British culture remained in the areas the Romans had settled, and the pre-Roman cultures in others. The people in what is now Wales continued to speak Common Brittonic with significant influence from Latin, as did people in other areas of western and northern Britain; this language eventually evolved into Old Welsh. The surviving poem "Y Gododdin" is in early Welsh and refers to the British kingdom of Gododdin with a capital at Din Eidyn (Edinburgh) and extending from the area of Stirling to the Tyne. Offa's Dyke was erected in the mid-8th century, forming a barrier between Wales and Mercia.

The process whereby the indigenous population of Wales came to think of themselves as "Welsh" (a name applied to them by Anglo-Saxon settlers) is not clear. There is plenty of evidence of the use of the term Brythoniaid (Britons); meanwhile, the earliest use of the word Kymry (referring not to the people but to the land—and possibly to northern Britain in addition to Wales) is found in a poem c. 633. The name of the region in northern England now known as Cumbria is derived from the same root. Only gradually did Cymru (the land) and Cymry (the people) come to supplant Brython. Although the Welsh language was certainly used at the time, Gwyn A. Williams argues that even at the time of the erection of Offa's Dyke, the people to its west saw themselves as Roman, citing the number of Latin inscriptions still being made into the 8th century. However, it is unclear whether such inscriptions reveal a general or normative use of Latin as a marker of identity or its selective use by the early Christian Church.

There was immigration to Wales after the Norman Conquest, and several Normans encouraged immigration to their new lands; the Landsker Line dividing the Pembrokeshire "Englishry" and "Welshry" is still detectable today. The terms Englishry and Welshry are used similarly about Gower.

== Genetic studies ==
Recent research on ancient DNA has concluded that much of Britain's Neolithic population was replaced by Beaker people in the Bronze Age. The British groups encountered by the Romans were thus largely descended from these Beaker populations.

The post-Roman period saw a significant alteration in the genetic makeup of southern Britain due to the arrival of the Anglo-Saxons; however, historical evidence suggests that Wales was little affected by these migrations. A study published in 2016 compared samples from modern Britain and Ireland with DNA found in skeletons from Iron Age, Roman and Anglo-Saxon era Yorkshire. The study found that most of the Iron Age and Roman era Britons showed strong similarities with both each other and modern-day Welsh populations, while modern southern and eastern English groups were closer to a later Anglo-Saxon burial.

Another study, using Iron Age and Anglo-Saxon samples from Cambridgeshire, concluded that modern Welsh people carry a 30% genetic contribution from Anglo-Saxon settlers in the post-Roman period; however, this could have been brought about due to later migration from England into Wales.

A third study, published in 2020 and based on Viking era data from across Europe, suggested that the Welsh trace, on average, 58% of their ancestry to the Brittonic people, up to 22% from a Danish-like source interpreted as largely representing the Anglo-Saxons, 3% from Norwegian Vikings, and 13% from further south in Europe such as Italy, to a lesser extent, Spain and can possibly be related to French immigration during the Norman period.

A 2015 genetic survey of modern British population groups found a distinct genetic difference between those from northern and southern Wales, which was interpreted as the legacy of Little England beyond Wales.

A study of a diverse sample of 2,039 individuals from the United Kingdom allowed the creation of a genetic map and the suggestion that there was a substantial migration of peoples from Europe prior to Roman times forming a strong ancestral component across England, Scotland, and Northern Ireland, but which had little impact in Wales. Wales forms a distinct genetic group, followed by a further division between north and south Wales, although there was evidence of a genetic difference between north and south Pembrokeshire as separated by the Landsker line. Speaking of these results, Professor Peter Donnelly, of the University of Oxford, said that the Welsh carry DNA which could be the most ancient in UK and that people from Wales are genetically relatively distinct.

== Modern times ==
Year	Population of Wales
1536	278,000
1620	360,000
1770	500,000
1801	587,000
1851	1,163,000
1911	2,421,000
1921	2,656,000
1939	2,487,000
1961	2,644,000
1991	2,644,000
2011	3,063,000

The population of Wales doubled from 587,000 in 1801 to 1,163,000 in 1851 and had reached 2,421,000 by 1911. Most of the increase came in the coal mining districts; especially Glamorganshire, which grew from 71,000 in 1801 to 232,000 in 1851 and 1,122,000 in 1911. Part of this increase can be attributed to the demographic transition seen in most industrialising countries during the Industrial Revolution, as death rates dropped and birth rates remained steady. However, there was also a large-scale migration into Wales during the Industrial Revolution. The English were the most numerous group, but there were also considerable numbers of Irish; and smaller numbers of other ethnic groups, including Italians who migrated to South Wales. Wales received other immigration from various parts of the British Commonwealth of Nations in the 20th century, and African-Caribbean and Asian communities immigrated particularly to urban Wales.

In the 2021 Census, 0.12% (71,440) of the usual resident population of England and Wales identified as Gypsy or Irish Traveller. Of these, 94.9% (67,815) lived in England and 5.1% (3,630) lived in Wales.

The most common identity amongst people without a UK identity in Wales was Polish (0.7% of usual residents), followed by Irish (0.3%), Romanian (0.2%) and Indian (0.2%).

=== 2001 census ===
In 2001, it is uncertain how many people in Wales considered themselves to be of Welsh ethnicity; the 2001 UK census did not offer 'Welsh' as an option; respondents had to use a box marked "Other". Ninety-six per cent of the population of Wales thus described themselves as being White British. Controversy surrounding the method of determining ethnicity began as early as 2000, when it was revealed that respondents in Scotland and Northern Ireland would be able to tick a box describing themselves as of Scottish or of Irish ethnicity, an option not available for Welsh or English respondents. Prior to the census, Plaid Cymru backed a petition calling for the inclusion of a Welsh tick-box and for the National Assembly to have primary law-making powers and its own National Statistics Office.

In the absence of a Welsh tick-box, the only tick-boxes available were 'white-British,' 'Irish', or 'other'. The Scottish parliament insisted that a Scottish ethnicity tick-box be included in the census in Scotland, and with this inclusion as many as 88.11% claimed Scottish ethnicity. Critics argued that a higher proportion of respondents would have described themselves as of Welsh ethnicity had a Welsh tick-box been made available. Additional criticism was levelled at the timing of the census, which was taken in the middle of the 2001 United Kingdom foot-and-mouth crisis. Organisers said that this had not affected the results. The foot-and-mouth crisis delayed the 2001 United Kingdom general election; the first time since the Second World War that any event had postponed an election.

In the census, 14% of the population took the 'extra step' to write in that they were of Welsh ethnicity. The highest percentage of those identifying as of Welsh ethnicity was recorded in Gwynedd (at 27%), followed by Carmarthenshire (23%), Ceredigion (22%) and the Isle of Anglesey (19%). Among respondents between 16 and 74 years of age, those claiming Welsh ethnicity were predominantly in professional and managerial occupations.

=== 2011 census ===
In advance of the 2011 UK Census, the Office for National Statistics (ONS) launched a census consultation exercise. They received replies from 28 different Welsh organisations and a large proportion of these referred to Welsh ethnicity, language or identity.

For the first time ever in British census history the 2011 Census gave the opportunity for people to describe their identity as Welsh or English. A 'dress rehearsal' of the Census was carried out on the Welsh island of Anglesey because of its rural nature and its high numbers of Welsh speakers. The Census, taken on 27 March 2011, asked a number of questions relating to nationality and national identity, including What is your country of birth? and How would you describe your national identity? (for the first time 'Welsh' and 'English' were included as options), What is your ethnic group? ('White Welsh/English/Scottish/Northern Irish/British' was an option) and Can you understand, speak, read or write Welsh?.

As of the 2011 census in Wales, 66 per cent (2.0 million) of residents reported a Welsh national identity (either on its own or combined with other identities). Of these, 218,000 responded that they had Welsh and British national identity. Just under 17 per cent (519,000) of people in Wales considered themselves to have a British national identity only. Most residents of Wales (96 per cent, 2.9 million) reported at least one national identity of English, Welsh, Scottish, Northern Irish, or British.

=== Surveys ===
A survey published in 2001, by the Centre for Research into Elections and Social Trends at Oxford University (sample size 1161), found that 14.6 per cent of respondents described themselves as British, not Welsh; 8.3 per cent saw themselves as more British than Welsh; 39.0 per cent described themselves as equally Welsh and British; 20.2 per cent saw themselves as more Welsh than British; and 17.9 per cent described themselves as Welsh, not British.

=== Religion ===
Forms of Christianity have dominated religious life in what is now Wales for more than 1,400 years. Most Welsh people of faith are affiliated with the Church in Wales or other Christian denominations such as the Presbyterian Church of Wales or Catholicism. Wales has a long tradition of nonconformism and Methodism. Some Welsh people are affiliated with either Buddhism, Hinduism, Judaism, Islam or Sikhism. In the 2001, around 7,000 classified themselves as following "other religions", including a reconstructed form of Druidism, which was the pre-Christian religion of Wales (not to be confused with the Druids of the Gorsedd at the National Eisteddfod of Wales). Approximately one third of the population, some 980,000 people, profess no religious faith whatsoever.

The census showed that slightly fewer than 10% of the Welsh population are regular church or chapel goers (a slightly smaller proportion than in England or Scotland), although about 58% of the population see themselves as Christian in some form. Judaism has quite a long history in Wales, with a Jewish community recorded in Swansea from around 1730. In August 1911, during a period of public order and industrial disputes, Jewish shops across the South Wales coalfield were damaged by mobs. Since that time the Jewish population of that area, which reached a peak of 4,000–5,000 in 1913, has declined; only Cardiff has retained a sizeable Jewish population, of about 2000 in the 2001 Census. The largest non-Christian faith in Wales is Islam, with about 22,000 members in 2001 served by about 40 mosques, following the first mosque established in Cardiff. A college for training clerics has been established at Llanybydder in West Wales. Islam arrived in Wales in the mid 19th century, and it is thought that Cardiff's Yemeni community is Britain's oldest Muslim community, established when the city was one of the world's largest coal exporting ports. Hinduism and Buddhism each have about 5,000 adherents in Wales, with the rural county of Ceredigion being the centre of Welsh Buddhism. Govinda's temple and restaurant, run by the Hare Krishnas in Swansea, is a focal point for many Welsh Hindus. There are about 2,000 Sikhs in Wales.

The Sabbatarian temperance movement was also historically strong among the Welsh; the sale of alcohol was prohibited on Sundays in Wales by the Sunday Closing (Wales) Act 1881 – the first legislation specifically issued for Wales since the Middle Ages. From the early 1960s, local council areas were permitted to hold referendums every seven years to determine whether they should be "wet" or "dry" on Sundays: most of the industrialised areas in the east and south went "wet" immediately, and by the 1980s the last district, Dwyfor in the northwest, went wet.

Despite Christianity dominating Wales, more ancient traditions persisted. In 1874 it was reported as common for an officiant to walk in front of the coffin with a horse's skull, which may be a tradition linked with the Mari Lwyd tradition.

== Language ==
The proportion of respondents in the 2011 census who said they could speak Welsh

The Welsh language is in the Insular Celtic family; historically spoken throughout Wales, with its predecessor Common Brittonic once spoken throughout most of the island of Great Britain. Prior to the 20th century, large numbers of Welsh people spoke only Welsh, with little or no fluent knowledge of English. Welsh remains the predominant language in parts of Wales, particularly in North Wales and parts of West Wales.

According to the 2001 census the number of Welsh speakers in Wales increased for the first time in 100 years, with 20.5% of a population of over 2.9 million claiming fluency in Welsh. In addition, 28% of the population of Wales claimed to understand Welsh. The census revealed that the increase was most significant in urban areas, such as Cardiff with an increase from 6.6% in 1991 to 10.9% in 2001, and Rhondda Cynon Taf with an increase from 9% in 1991 to 12.3% in 2001. However, the proportion of Welsh speakers declined in Gwynedd from 72.1% in 1991 to 68.7% in 2001, to 65.4% in 2011 and 64.4% in 2021. Similarly, in Ceredigion the percentage fell from 59.1% in 1991 to 51.8% in 2001, to 47.3% in 2011 and to 45.3% in 2021. Ceredigion saw a 19.5% influx of new residents between 1991 and 2001.

The decline in Welsh speakers in much of rural Wales is attributable to non-Welsh-speaking residents moving to North Wales, driving up property prices above what locals may afford, according to former Gwynedd county councillor Seimon Glyn of Plaid Cymru, whose controversial comments in 2001 focused attention on the issue. As many as a third of all properties in Gwynedd are bought by people from outside Wales. The issue of locals being priced out of the local housing market is common to many rural communities throughout Britain, but in Wales the added dimension of language complicates the issue, as many new residents do not learn the Welsh language.

A Plaid Cymru taskforce headed by Dafydd Wigley recommended land should be allocated for affordable local housing, called for grants for locals to buy houses, and recommended that council tax on holiday homes should double.

However, the same census shows that 25% of residents were born outside Wales. The number of Welsh speakers in other places in Britain is uncertain, but there are significant numbers in the main cities.

Even among Welsh speakers, very few people speak only Welsh, with nearly all being bilingual in English. However, a large number of Welsh speakers are more comfortable expressing themselves in Welsh than in English. Some prefer to speak English in South Wales or the urbanised areas and Welsh in the North or in rural areas.

Due to an increase in Welsh-language nursery education, recent census data reveals a reversal of decades of linguistic decline: there are now more Welsh speakers under five years of age than over 60. For many young people in Wales, the acquisition of Welsh is a gateway to better careers, according to research from the Welsh Language Board and Careers Wales. The Welsh Government identified media as one of six areas likely to experience greater demand for Welsh speakers: the sector is Wales's third-largest revenue earner.

Although Welsh is a minority language, and thus threatened by the dominance of English, support for the language grew during the second half of the 20th century, along with the rise of Welsh nationalism in the form of groups such as the political party Plaid Cymru and Cymdeithas yr Iaith Gymraeg (Welsh Language Society). The language is used in the bilingual Welsh Parliament (Senedd) and entered on its records, with English translation. The high cost of translation from English to Welsh has proved controversial. In the past the rules of the British Parliament forbade the use of Welsh in any proceedings. Only English was allowed as the only language all members were assumed to speak. In 2017, the UK government agreed to support the use of Welsh in the Welsh Grand Committee, although not in parliamentary debate in the house outside of this committee. In 2018 Welsh was used in the grand committee for the first time.

Welsh as a first language is largely concentrated in the less urban north and west of Wales, principally Gwynedd, inland Conwy and Denbighshire, northern and south-western Powys, the Isle of Anglesey, Carmarthenshire, North Pembrokeshire, Ceredigion, and parts of western Glamorgan, although first-language and other fluent speakers can be found throughout Wales.

For some, speaking Welsh is an important part of their Welsh identity. Parts of the culture are strongly connected to the language — notably the Eisteddfod tradition, poetry and aspects of folk music and dance.

== National symbols ==
- The Flag of Wales (Baner Cymru) incorporates the red dragon (Y Ddraig Goch), a popular symbol of Wales and the Welsh people, along with the Tudor colours of green and white. It was used by Henry VII at the Battle of Bosworth Field in 1485, after which it was carried in state to St. Paul's Cathedral. The red dragon was then included in the Tudor royal arms to signify their Welsh descent. It was officially recognised as the Welsh national flag in 1959. Since the British Union Flag does not have any Welsh representation, the Flag of Wales has become very popular.
- The Flag of Saint David is sometimes used as an alternative to the national flag, and is flown on Saint David's Day.
- The dragon, part of the national flag design, is also a popular Welsh symbol. The oldest recorded use of the dragon to symbolise Wales is from the Historia Brittonum, written around 820, but it is popularly supposed to have been the battle standard of King Arthur and other ancient Celtic leaders. Following the annexation of Wales by England, the dragon was used as a supporter in the English monarch's coat of arms.
- Both the daffodil and the leek are symbols of Wales. The origin of the leek can be traced back to the 16th century and the daffodil, encouraged by David Lloyd George, became popular in the 19th century. This may be due to confusion of the Welsh for leek, cenhinen, and that for daffodil, cenhinen Bedr or St. Peter's leek. Both are worn as symbols by the Welsh on Saint David's Day, 1 March.
- The Prince of Wales' feathers, the heraldic badge of the Prince of Wales, is sometimes adapted by Welsh bodies for use in Wales. The symbolism is explained on the article for Edward, the Black Prince, who was the first Prince of Wales to bear the emblem. The Welsh Rugby Union uses such a design for its own badge.

== Welsh emigration ==
There has been migration from Wales to the rest of Britain throughout its history. During the Industrial Revolution thousands of Welsh people migrated, for example, to Liverpool and Ashton-in-Makerfield. As a result, some people from England, Scotland and Ireland have Welsh surnames.

Welsh settlers moved to other parts of Europe, concentrated in certain areas. During the late 19th and early 20th centuries, a small wave of contract miners from Wales arrived in Northern France; the centres of Welsh-French population are in coal mining towns, and particularly the French department of Pas-de-Calais along with miners from many other countries. They tended to cluster in communities around their churches.

Settlers from Wales (and later Patagonian Welsh) arrived in Newfoundland in the early 19th century, and founded towns in Labrador's coast region; in 1819, the ship Albion left Cardigan for New Brunswick, carrying Welsh settlers to Canada; on board were 27 Cardiganian families, many of whom were farmers. In 1852, Thomas Benbow Phillips of Tregaron established a settlement of about 100 Welsh people in the state of Rio Grande do Sul in Brazil.

Internationally Welsh people have emigrated, in relatively small numbers (in proportion to population, Irish emigration to the US may have been 26 times greater than Welsh emigration), to many countries, including the US (in particular, Pennsylvania), Canada and Y Wladfa in Patagonia, Argentina. Jackson County, Ohio was sometimes referred to as "Little Wales", and one of several communities where Welsh was widely spoken. There was a Welsh language press but by the late 1940s, the last Welsh language newspaper, y Drych began to publish in English. Malad City in Idaho, which began as a Welsh Mormon settlement, lays claim to a greater proportion of inhabitants of Welsh descent than anywhere outside Wales itself. Malad's local High School is known as the "Malad Dragons", and flies the Welsh Flag as its school colours. Welsh people have also settled in New Zealand and Australia.

Around 1.75 million Americans report themselves to have Welsh ancestry, as did 458,705 Canadians in Canada's 2011 census. This compares with 2.9 million people living in Wales (as of the 2001 census).

There is no known evidence which would objectively support the legend that the Mandan, a Native American tribe of the central United States, are Welsh emigrants who reached North America under Prince Madog in 1170.

The Ukrainian city of Donetsk was founded in 1869 by a Welsh businessman, John Hughes (an engineer from Merthyr Tydfil) who constructed a steel plant and several coal mines in the region; the town was thus named Yuzovka (Юзовка) in recognition of his role in its founding ("Yuz" being a Russian or Ukrainian approximation of Hughes).

Former Australian Prime Minister Julia Gillard was born in Barry, Wales. After she suffered from bronchopneumonia as a child, her parents were advised that it would aid her recovery to live in a warmer climate. This led the family to migrate to Australia in 1966.

== See also ==
- Geography and identity in Wales
- Kale (Welsh Roma) – Romani subgroup
- List of Welsh mathematicians
- List of Welsh people
- List of Welsh women writers
- List of women artists associated with Wales
- Modern Celts
- Welsh American
- Welsh Argentine
- Welsh Australian
- Welsh Canadian
- Welsh Chilean
- Welsh history in Chicago
- Welsh immigration
- Welsh Italians
- Welsh New Zealander
- Y Wladfa
