= Welsh Australians =

Awstraliaid Cymreig (Welsh)
- (Wales) (Australia)

Total population
- 156,108 (by ancestry, 2021) (0.6% of the Australian population); 29,250 (by birth, 2021)

Languages
- Australian English, Welsh

Religion
- Anglicanism, Presbyterianism, Baptism, Methodism, Catholicism, Irreligion

Related ethnic groups
- Welsh, Scottish Australians, Irish Australians, Cornish Australians, English Australians, Welsh New Zealanders, Welsh Argentines, Welsh Americans, Welsh Canadians

Welsh Australians (Welsh: Awstraliaid Cymreig) are citizens of Australia whose ancestry originates in Wales.

== Demographics ==
People with Welsh ancestry as a percentage of the population in Australia divided geographically by statistical local area, as of the 2011 census

According to the 2006 Australian census 25,317 Australian residents were born in Wales, while 113,242 (0.44%) claimed Welsh ancestry, either alone or with another ancestry.

A 1996 study gives the total ethnic strength of Welsh Australians as 243,400. This is made up by 44,100 of un-mixed origin and 683,700 of mixed origin. This would make the Welsh the fifth largest Anglo-Celtic group in Australia after the English, Irish, Scottish and Cornish.

== Welsh emigration to Australia ==
It is believed that the eastern coast of Australia reminded Captain James Cook of the coast of South Wales (especially the Vale of Glamorgan coast, which he knew), hence the name he gave to it, "New South Wales". The first European colony in Australia was in New South Wales, beginning with the First Fleet of 1788. Welsh people numbered amongst these first settlers, and continued to arrive in the new colony through the British policy of penal transportation that was implemented for many criminal acts.

Mass emigration from Wales to Australia began in the nineteenth century with New South Wales and Victoria being popular destinations. Nineteenth-century Welsh settlers were mostly farmers, followed later by gold diggers and coal miners.

A gold rush began in Australia in the early 1850s, and the Eureka Stockade rebellion in 1854 was an early expression of nationalist sentiment. Amongst its leaders was the Welsh-born Chartist John Basson Humffray, one of a significant group of immigrants that came over from Wales at this time.

== List of notable Welsh Australians ==
Name	Born-Died	Notable for	Connection with Australia	Connection with Wales
Tony Abbott	1957–	former prime minister	has lived in Australia since he was three years old	born in England and maternal grandmother was Welsh
James Atkin, Baron Atkin of Aberdovey (also known as Lord Atkin)	1867–1944	lawyer and judge	born in Australia	grew up in Wales from age 4; always thought of himself as Welsh
John Beard	1943–	artist	lives in Australia	born in Wales
Edgeworth David	1858–1934	geologist and explorer (discovered the Hunter Valley coalfield)	spent most of his life in Australia	born in Wales
Stella Donnelly	1992–	Musician	Moved to Australia at age ten	born in Wales
Hughie Edwards	1914–1982	senior officer in the RAF, former governor of Western Australia, recipient of Victoria Cross, most highly decorated serviceman of WW2	Born in Australia	Welsh parents
Tyson Frizell	1991–	Rugby League footballer	Born in Australia	Welsh father
Julia Gillard	1961–	Former prime minister	Migrated to Australia at age five	born in Wales
Samuel Griffith	1845–1920	former premier of Queensland, chief justice of the High Court; principal author of the Constitution of Australia	migrated to Australia in 1853	born in Wales
Rolf Harris	1930–2023	artist, entertainer and convicted child sex offender	born in Australia, lived in the United Kingdom from 1953	Welsh parents
Billy Hughes	1862–1952	former prime minister	migrated to Australia 1884	Welsh parents
Jean Jenkins	1938–	former senator	migrated to Australia 1969	Welsh parents and upbringing
Joseph Jenkins	1818–1898	diarist, poet and swagman	resident in Australia 1869-1894	born in Wales
Andrew Johns	1974–	Rugby League footballer	born in Australia, represented New South Wales and Australia	Welsh grandfather
David Jones (merchant)	1793–1873	retailer and businessman	set up his business in Australia	born in Wales
Gethin Jones	1995–	professional soccer player	born in Australia: member of the Socceroos since 2024	family and upbringing in Wales; played for Wales U-17, U-19 and U-21 teams
T. Harri Jones	1921–1965	poet and lecturer	migrated to Australia	born in Wales
John McCarthy	1967–	Australian rules footballer	migrated to Australia	born in Wales
Dannii Minogue	1971–	singer and entertainer	born in Australia	mother born in Wales
Kylie Minogue	1968–	singer and actress	born in Australia	mother born in Wales
Alf Morgans	1850–1933	former premier of Western Australia	moved to Australia in 1896	born in Wales
Thomas Price (South Australian politician)	1852–1909	former premier of South Australia	moved to Australia in 1883	born in Wales
Naomi Watts	1968–	actress	moved to Australia when she was 15	lived in Wales between the ages of seven and 14; mother's parents Welsh
Nathan Walker	1994–	first Australian professional ice hockey player in the National Hockey League	moved to Australia when he was 3	born in Wales
Rhys Williams	1988–	professional soccer player	born in and grew up in Australia; member of the Socceroos in 2009–2010	Welsh grandparents on his father's side; played for the Welsh under-21 team

== See also ==
- Welsh language in Australia
- Welsh New Zealanders
