= Anglo-Celtic Australians =

Australians born in or descended from the British Isles

- Flag of Australia, based on the British Blue Ensign is commonly used as an ethnic flag of Anglo-Celtic Australians

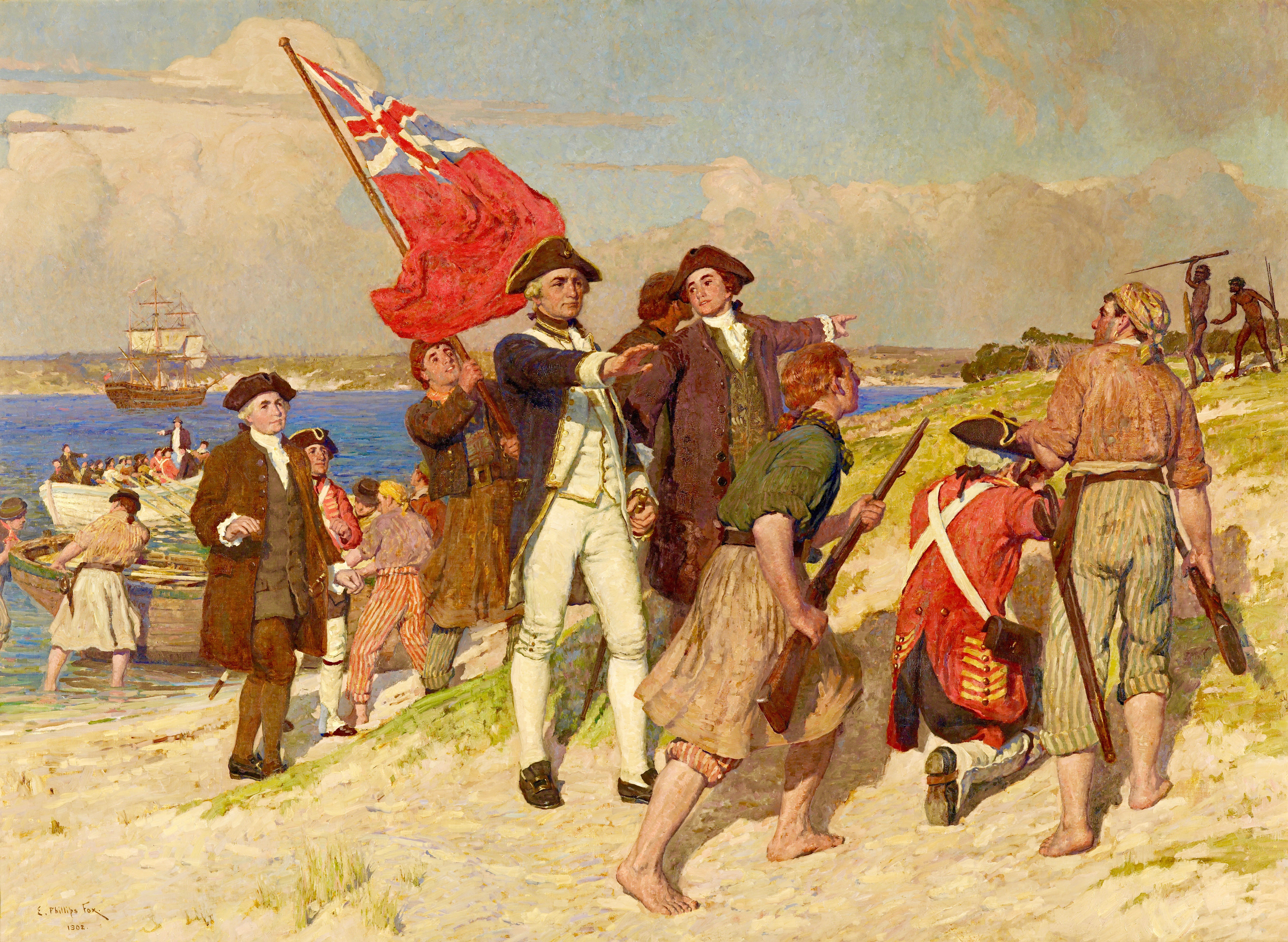
- Landing of James Cook at Botany Bay on 29 April 1770

Total population
- At least 42.2% of the Australian population (2021) (Note: Number of "English", "Irish", "Scottish", "Welsh", "Cornish", "British", "Channel Islander" and "Manx" ancestry responses as a proportion of the total population. Ancestry figures do not amount to 100% as the Australian Bureau of Statistics allows up to two ancestry responses per person.) (Note: Does not include those nominating their ancestry as "Australian", who are categorised within the Oceanian group. The Australian Bureau of Statistics has stated that most people nominating "Australian" ancestry have at least partial Anglo-Celtic European ancestry.) English Australians: 8,385,928 Irish Australians: 2,410,833 Scottish Australians: 2,176,777 Cornish Australians: 768,100 Welsh Australians: 683,700 Anglo-Celtic Australians (so described): 13,150 Manx Australians: 2,424 Channel Islander Australians: 1,273

Regions with significant populations
- All parts of Australia including urban, rural and regional Australia

Languages
- Predominantly Australian English; Welsh • Irish • Scottish Gaelic • Cornish

Religion
- Traditionally Christianity

Related ethnic groups
- European New Zealanders

Anglo-Celtic Australians are a predominantly English-speaking ancestral group of Australians whose ancestors originate wholly or partially in the British and Irish Isles – predominantly in England (including Cornwall), Ireland, Scotland and Wales, as well as the Isle of Man, Channel Islands and British Isles descendent people of other settler colonies such as New Zealand, Canada, and historically, British Africa.

While Anglo-Celtic Australians do not form an official ethnic grouping in the Australian Bureau of Statistics' Australian Standard Classification of Cultural and Ethnic Groups, due to the long historical dominance and intermixture of Australians with ancestries from the British Isles, it is commonly used as an informal ethnic identifier.

The term has received criticism for erasing historical distinctions between English and Celtic settlers. In particular, it does not account for the political and social segregation of English and Irish Australians which some scholars have labelled an apartheid or the fact that while many English arrived in Australia as willing immigrants, many Irish were forcibly transported as prisoners or arrived as refugees.

At the 2021 census, the number of ancestry responses from the following groups as a proportion of the total Australian population amounted to 51.7%: English Australian, Irish Australian, Scottish Australian, Welsh Australian, Cornish Australians, British Australian (so described), Manx Australian, Channel Islander Australian. (Note: Ancestry figures do not amount to 100% as the Australian Bureau of Statistics allows up to two ancestry responses per person.) The precise number of Anglo-Celtic Australians is unknown due to the way in which ancestry data is collected in Australia. For instance, many census recipients nominated two Anglo-Celtic ancestries due to the long history of these ancestries in Australia, tending towards an overcount. Conversely, the Australian Bureau of Statistics has stated that most people nominating "Australian" ancestry have at least partial Anglo-Celtic European ancestry despite "Australian" ancestry being classified as part of the Oceanian ancestry group, tending towards an undercount.

== History ==
=== Pre-Federation ===
The British Government initiated European settlement of the Australian continent by establishing a penal settlement at Sydney Cove in 1788. Between then and 1852, about 100,000 convicts (mostly tried in England) were transported to eastern Australia. Scotland and Wales contributed relatively few convicts.

Native-born Australians of British and Irish descent were approximately a quarter of the population of the colony of New South Wales in both 1817 and 1828. There were slightly more native-born than free settlers in 1850. They were nearly half of the population in 1868. Their proportion of the population decreased during the times of the rapid population growth brought on by the gold-rushes. The convicts were augmented by free settlers, including large numbers who arrived during the gold-rush in the 1850s. As late as 1861, people born in England, Wales, Scotland and Ireland outnumbered even the Australia-born population. The number of settlers in Australia who were born in the United Kingdom (UK) peaked at 825,000 in 1891, from which point the proportion of British among all immigrants to Australia steadily declined.

Until 1859, 2.2 million (73%) of the free settlers who immigrated were British.

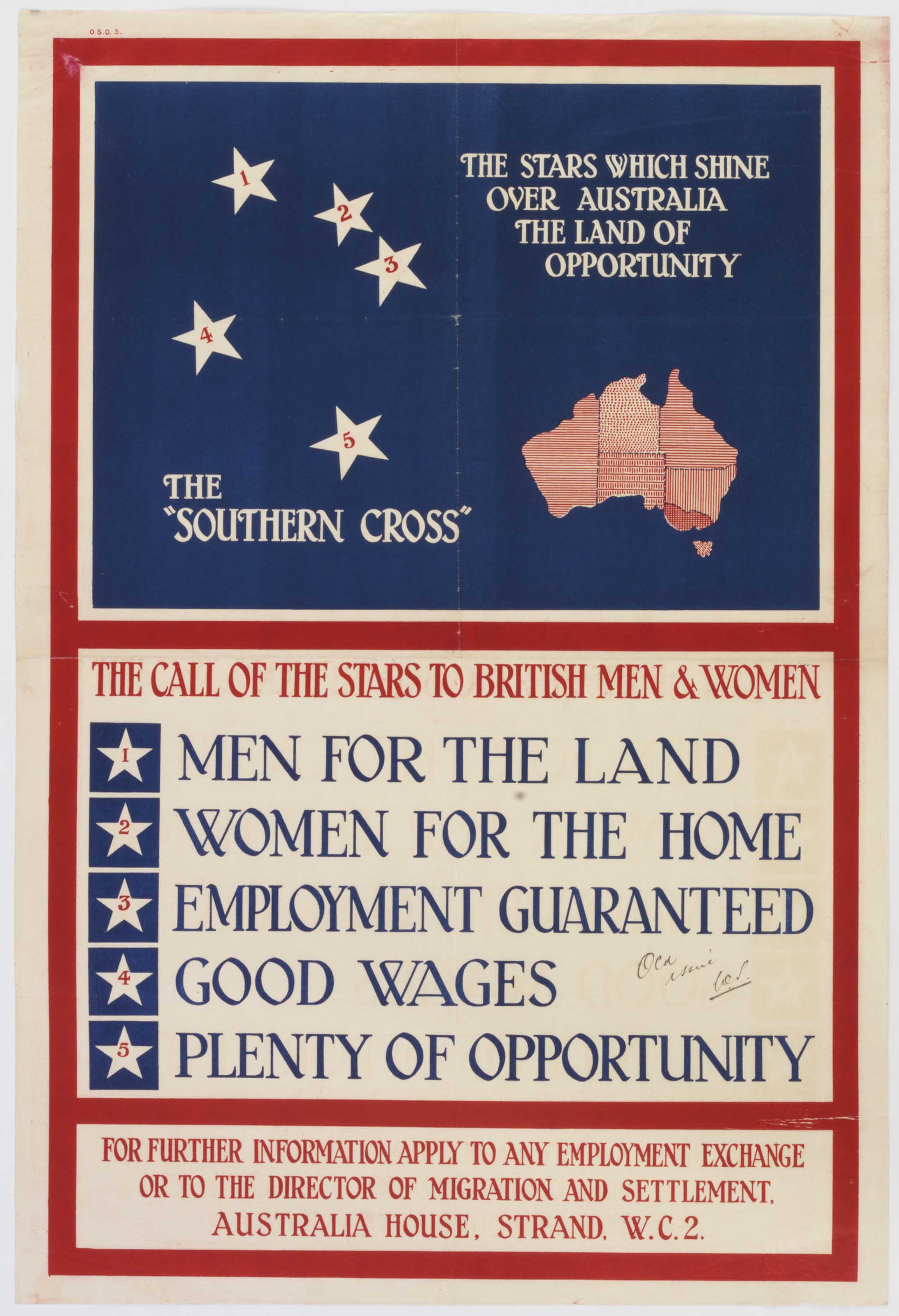
Australian Government poster issued by the Overseas Settlement Office to attract British immigrants (1928).

=== Post-Federation ===
From the beginning of the colonial era until the mid-20th century, the vast majority of settlers to Australia were from Britain and Ireland, with the English being the dominant group, followed by the Irish and Scottish. Among the leading ancestries, increases in Australian, Irish, and German ancestries and decreases in English, Scottish, and Welsh ancestries appear to reflect such shifts in perception or reporting. These reporting shifts at least partly resulted from changes in the design of the census question, in particular the introduction of a tick box format in 2001.

Those born in the United Kingdom were the largest foreign group throughout the 20th century. Prior to the last quarter of the century, the United Kingdom was strongly favoured as a source country by immigrant selection policies and remained the largest single component of the annual immigration intake until 1995–96, when immigrants from New Zealand surpassed it in number. However, their share of the total immigrant population is in decline. Those from the United Kingdom comprised 58 per cent of the total overseas-born population in 1901, compared to 27 per cent in 1996. An even greater decline has occurred for those born in Ireland. In 1901, those born in Ireland comprised 22 per cent of all immigrants, while in 1996 the Ireland-born represented just 1 per cent of the immigrant population.

While those born in England have formed the largest component of the British immigrant population, Australia has also received significant numbers of immigrants from Ireland, Scotland, and Wales. Up until the First World War the Irish were, in their own right, the second largest immigrant population.

The most dramatic increase in the British immigrant population occurred between 1961 and 1971. The number of British-born people living in Australia exceeded one million at the 1971 Census and has remained above one million to this day. The United Kingdom-born population in Australia reached a peak of 1,107,119 in 1991.

== Demographics ==
Anglo-Celtic Australian 1846 - 2021
Year	% of total population
1846	57.2
1861	78.1
1891	86.8
1947	89.7
1988	74.6
1996	71.45
1999	69.9
2016	58
2021	54
Source: 1846, 1996, 1999, 2016, 2021

Anglo-Celtic is not an official ancestry category in the Australian census. Census respondents may nominate up to two ancestries. The number of ancestry responses from the following groups as a proportion of the total Australian population amounted to 51.7% at the 2021 census: English Australian, Irish Australian, Scottish Australian, Cornish Australians, Welsh Australian, British Australian (so described), Manx Australian, Channel Islander Australian. (Note: Ancestry figures do not amount to 100% as the Australian Bureau of Statistics allows up to two ancestry responses per person.) The precise number of Anglo-Celtic Australians is unknown due to the way in which ancestry data is collected in Australia. For instance, many census recipients nominated two Anglo-Celtic ancestries due to the long history of these ancestries in Australia, tending towards an overcount. Conversely, the Australian Bureau of Statistics has stated that most people nominating "Australian" ancestry have at least partial Anglo-Celtic European ancestry despite "Australian" ancestry being classified as part of the Oceanian ancestry group, tending towards an undercount.

At the 2021 census, the most commonly nominated Anglo-Celtic ancestries were:

- English Australian: 8,395,928
- Irish Australian: 2,410,833
- Scottish Australian: 2,176,777
- Cornish Australians: 768,100
- Welsh Australians: 683,700
- British Australians (so described): 13,150
- Manx Australians: 2,424
- Channel Islander Australians: 1,273

The United Kingdom remains a significant source of immigrants to Australia. In 2005–06, 22,143 persons born in the United Kingdom settled in Australia, representing 21.4% of all migrants. At the 2006 Census (excluding overseas visitors) 1,038,165 persons identified themselves as having been born in the United Kingdom (5.2% of the Australian population), while 50,251 identified themselves as Irish born.

Melbourne and Sydney have the lowest rates of Anglo-Celtic Australians, particularly in certain regions of each city (such as Western Sydney). Tasmania could have the nation's highest proportion of citizens of Anglo-Celtic origin, possibly as high as 85 percent. On the evidence of statistics of ethnic derivation Tasmania could also be considered more British than New Zealand (where the Anglo-Celtic majority has fallen below 75 percent).

== Historical demographics ==
=== English, Scottish, Welsh and Irish population ===
The following table shows those born in Great Britain and Ireland for every Australian census as a proportion of the total foreign-born population.

UK and Ireland-born population of Australia % of all overseas born
Year	Anglo-Celtic / %		United Kingdom % of overseas-born		Ireland % of overseas-born		Ref(s)
1881	689,642	-	-	-	-	-	
1901	679,159	79.2	495 074	57.7	184,085	21.5	
1911	590,722	78.0	451,288	59.6	139,434	18.4	
1921	673,403	80.2	568,370	67.7	105,033	12.5	
1933	712,458	78.9	633,806	70.2	78,652	8.7	
1947	541,267	72.7	496,454	66.7	44,813	6.0	
1954	661,205	51.6	616,532	47.9	44,673	3.5	
1961	755,402	42.6	718,345	40.4	37,057	2.1	
1966	908,664	-	870,548		38,116		
1971	1,088,210	42.2	1,046,356	40.6	41,854	1.6	
1976	1,117,599	-	1,070,233		47,361		
1981	1,132,601	41.1	1,086,625	36.5			
1986	1,127,196	34.7					
1991	1,174,860	31.17	1,107,119	30.0	51,642	1.17	
1996	,124,031	-	1,072,562	28.7	51,469	-	
2001	1,086,496	-	1,036,261	25.2	50,235		
2006	1,088,416	-	1,038,162	23.5	50,255	-	
2011	1,168,398	20.8	1,101,082	20.8	67,318	0.0	
2016	1,162,654	-	1,087,759	17.7	74,895	-	
2021	TBA	TBA	TBA	TBA	TBA	-	

Notes: From 1954 onwards people from "Northern Ireland" and "Ulster" were recorded separately from the people of "Ireland". The 1966 census (is Republic of Ireland & Ireland (undefined).

== Ancestry ==
The following table shows various Anglo-Celtic ancestries since 1986, the first census to include as a question on ancestry. The aim of the question was to measure the ethnic composition of the population as a whole. Very little use was made of the ancestry data from the 1986 Census. As a consequence, ancestry was not included in either the 1991 or 1996 Censuses. Between 1987 and 1999, the Anglo-Celtic component of Australia's population declined from 75 per cent to 70 per cent. In 1999, the Anglo-Celtic share of the Australian population was calculated as 69.9%.

Ancestry		1986	%	2001	%	2006	%	2011	%	% Change 2006–2011
(England)	English	6,607,228	42.4	6,358,880	33.9	6,283,647	31.6	7,238,533	36.1%	+15.2%
(Republic of Ireland)	Irish	902,679	5.8	1,919,727	10.2	1,803,736	9.1	2,087,800	10.4	+15.7%
(Scotland)	Scottish	740,522	4.7	540,046	2.9	1,501,200	7.6	1,792,622	8.3	+19.4%
(Wales)	Welsh	no data	no data	84,246	no data	113,244	0.6	125,597	0.6	+10.9%
Total		8,250,429	52.9	8,902,899	47.0	9,701,827	48.9	11,244,552	53.0% – 55.4%	

=== Maps ===
English ancestry

Scottish ancestry

Welsh ancestry

Irish

People born in the UK, Channel Islands and Isle of Man

== Controversy and criticism ==
Some have argued that the term is entirely a product of multiculturalism that ignores the history of sectarianism in Australia. For example, historian John Hirst wrote in 1994: "Mainstream Australian society was reduced to an ethnic group and given an ethnic name: Anglo-Celt."

According to Hirst:

In the eyes of multiculturalists, Australian society of the 1940s, 150 years after first settlement, is adequately described as Anglo-Celtic. At least this acknowledges that the people of Australia were Irish and Scots as well as English, but it has nothing more substantial than a hyphen joining them. In fact a distinct new culture had been formed. English, Scots and Irish had formed a common identity – first of all British and then gradually Australian as well. In the 1930s the historian W. K. Hancock could aptly describe them as Independent Australian Britons.

According to Hirst, the label was historically inaccurate and objectionable. He later wrote:

In calling Australians of the 1940s and their descendants ‘Anglo-Celts’ multiculturalists depart from their own rule. This term has not been used by these people to describe themselves. They were proud that they had constrained particular ethnic identities and subsumed them into the broader terms of British and Australian. The imposition of ‘Anglo-Celt’ is the tyrannical arm of multiculturalism. I find the term offensive.

Hirst also argued that nineteenth-century Australian nation-building involved encouraging the English, Scots and Irish to adopt a common British or Australian identity rather than retain older ethnic divisions:

In the nineteenth century there were (to name the largest groups) Aborigines, English, Scots, Irish, Chinese and Pacific Islanders as well as the native-born. However, those who controlled the society considered that the process of nation-building required ethnic identities to be limited and superseded. The English, Scots and Irish were traditional enemies bound together in one state, the United Kingdom. In Australia there was a conscious, determined effort to avoid old-world enmities and to bring these three peoples to think of themselves as one – British, or Australian–British, or Australian.

The Irish-Australian journalist Siobhán McHugh has argued that the term "Anglo-Celtic" is "an insidious distortion of our past and a galling denial of the struggle by an earlier minority group", Irish Australians, "against oppression and demonisation... In what we now cosily term "Anglo-Celtic" Australia, a virtual social apartheid existed at times between [Irish] Catholics and [British] Protestants", which did not end until the 1960s.

The term was also criticised by the historian Patrick O'Farrell as "a grossly misleading, false, and patronising convenience, one crassly present-oriented. Its use removes from consciousness and recognition a major conflict fundamental to any comprehension not only of Australian history but of our present core culture."

== Culture ==
Streams of migration from the United Kingdom and the Republic of Ireland to Australia played a key role in Australia's cultural development, despite the last substantial scheme for preferential migration from Britain to Australia ending in 1972. There is a long history of cultural exchange between the countries and many Australians have used Britain as a stepping-stone to international success, e.g., Nellie Melba, Peter Dawson, Clive James, and Robert Hughes. In 1967, British migrants in Australia formed an association to represent their special interests: the United Kingdom Settlers' Association, which subsequently became the British Australian Community.

On 10 July 2017, at a press conference in London, Australian Prime Minister Malcolm Turnbull said:

"Australians feel at home in the United Kingdom and Britons feel at home in Australia. Most Australians have some of their ancestry at least from the United Kingdom and five per cent of Australians were actually born in the United Kingdom. The culture, the laws the traditions of Britain were brought to Australia with the European settlement, British settlement that were brought as part of the heritage of the men and women, including my forebears, that founded what we know today as modern Australia". . . There are no two nations in the world that trust each other more than the United Kingdom and Australia. We are family in a historical sense. We're family in a genetic sense. But we are so close and that trust is getting stronger all the time.

== Place names of British origin ==
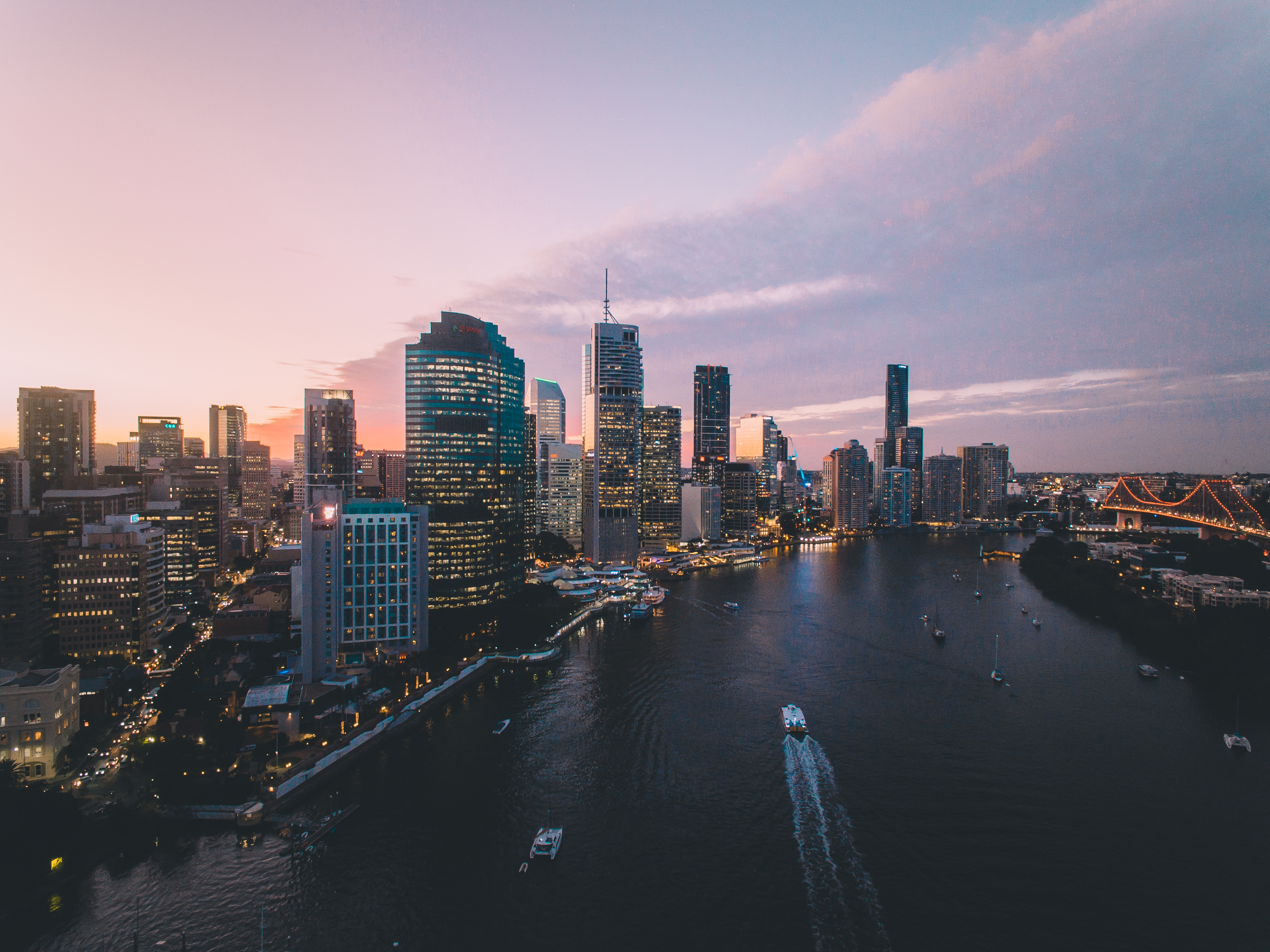
Brisbane – named after Scotsman Sir Thomas Brisbane, the Governor of New South Wales.

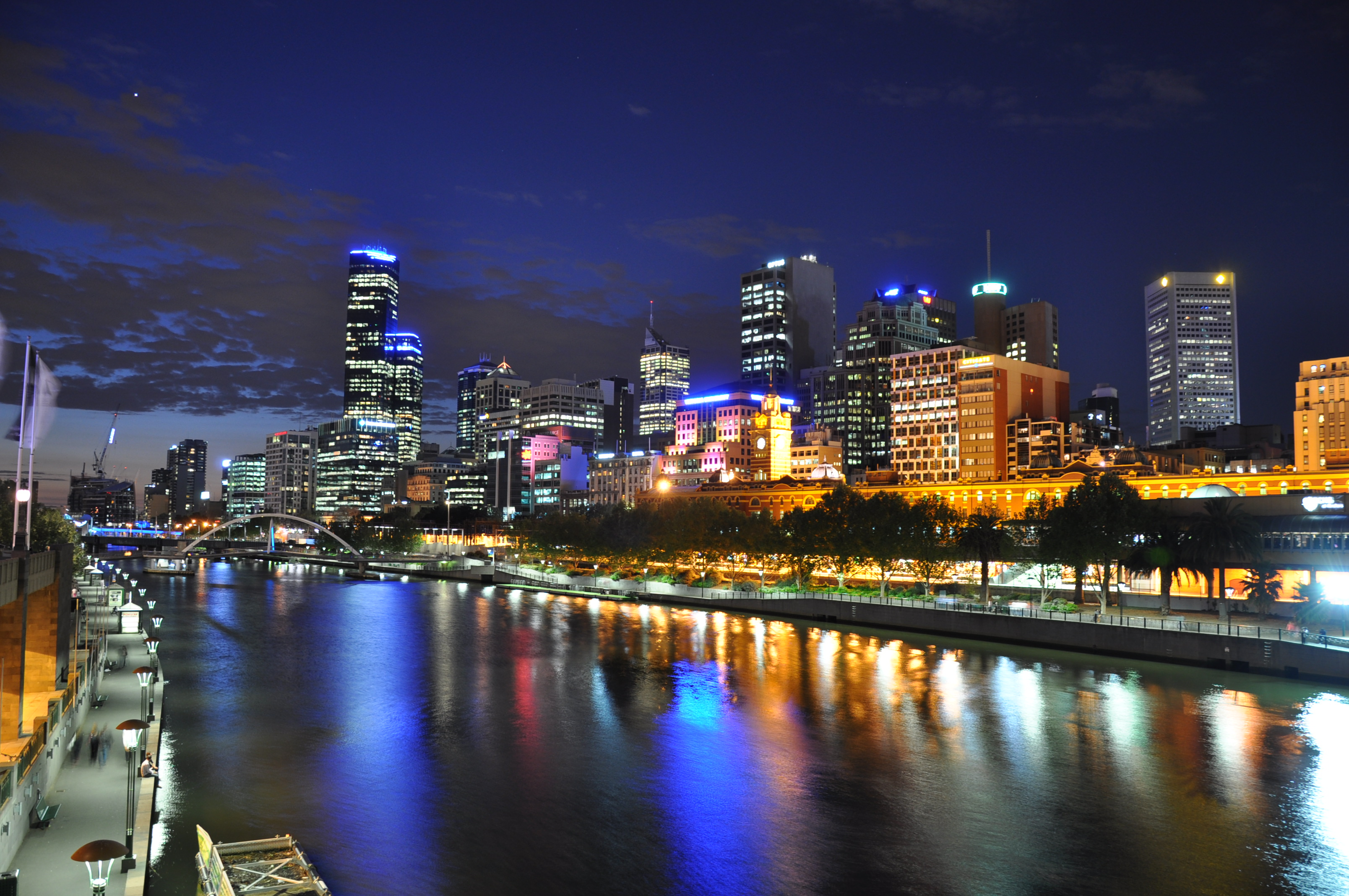
Melbourne – named in honour of William Lamb, 2nd Viscount Melbourne and thus indirectly takes its name from the village of Melbourne, England.

There are many places in Australia named after people and places in the United Kingdom as a result of the many British settlers and explorers; in addition, some places were named after the British royal family.

=== New South Wales ===
New South Wales – Cook first named the land "New Wales", named after Wales. However, in the copy held by the Admiralty, he "revised the wording" to "New South Wales".

- Hyde Park – was named after the original Hyde Park in London, England and is the oldest public parkland in Australia
- Newcastle, New South Wales – is named after Newcastle, England
- The state capital city of Sydney is named in honour of English politician Thomas Townshend, 1st Viscount Sydney.

=== Northern Territory ===
- The state capital city of Darwin. A Scottish naval officer named the region "Port Darwin" in honour of English naturalist Charles Darwin.

=== Queensland ===
Queensland – The state was named in honour of Queen Victoria, who on 6 June 1859 signed Letters Patent separating the colony from New South Wales.

- Brisbane – is named after Scotsman Thomas Brisbane.

=== South Australia ===
- The state capital city of Adelaide founded in 1836, is named in honour of Adelaide of Saxe-Meiningen, queen consort to King William IV.

=== Tasmania ===
- Hobart – city named after the English politician Robert Hobart 4th Earl of Buckinghamshire who was British Secretary of State for War and the Colonies in 1804 at the time of its settlement.
- Launceston – was named in honour of the New South Wales Governor Captain Philip Gidley King, who was born in Launceston, Cornwall, England.

=== Victoria ===
Victoria – like Queensland, was named after Queen Victoria, who had been on the British throne for 14 years when the colony was established in 1851.

- Melbourne – was named in honour of William Lamb, 2nd Viscount Melbourne, Queen Victoria's first Prime Minister, and thus indirectly takes its name from the village of Melbourne, Derbyshire, England.

=== Western Australia ===
- Perth – The city is named after Perth, Scotland, by influence of Sir George Murray, then British Secretary of State for War and the Colonies.

=== External territories ===
- Norfolk Island - Captain James Cook named it after Mary Howard, Duchess of Norfolk (c. 1712 – 1773).

== See also ==
- Old Stock Canadians
- Old Stock Americans
- Anglo-Celtic
- Anglo
- Demographics of Australia
- European Australians
- Europeans in Oceania
- Irish Australians
- Scottish Australians
- Cornish Australians
- English Australians
- Welsh Australians
- British diaspora
