= Scottish Australians =

Australians of Scottish birth or descent

Scots Australiens (Scots) Astràilianaich Albannach (Scottish Gaelic)

Total population
- 2,176,777 (by ancestry, 2021) (8.4% of the Australian population); 130,060 (by birth, 2021)

Regions with significant populations
- All states and territories of Australia

Languages
- English, Scots

Religion
- Traditionally Presbyterianism, Irreligion

Related ethnic groups
- Scottish people, Lowland Scots people, Anglo-Celtic Australians, Irish Australians, English Australians, Welsh Australians, Manx Australians

Scottish Australians (Scots: Scots Australiens; Scottish Gaelic: Astràilianaich Albannach) are Australians of full or partial Scottish ancestry

According to the 2021 Australian Census, 130,060 people in Australia were born in Scotland while 2,176,777 claimed Scottish ancestry, either alone or in combination with another ancestry.

== History ==
The links between Scotland and Australia stretch back to the first British expedition of the Endeavour under command of Lieutenant James Cook who was himself the son of a Scottish ploughman. Cook navigated and charted the east coast of Australia, making first landfall at Botany Bay on 29 April 1770. His reports in Cook's expedition would lead to British settlement of the continent, and during the voyage Cook also named two groups of Pacific islands in honour of Scotland: New Caledonia and the New Hebrides. The first European to die on Australian soil was a Scot; Forbey Sutherland from Orkney, an able seaman died on 30 April 1770 of consumption and was the first to be buried on the colony by Captain Cook, who named Sutherland Point at Botany Bay in his honour.

The Scottish presence in Australia carried a troubling historical dimension and also a dark history. Discriminatory attitudes and disputes over territorial control resulted in significant conflicts between Scottish settlers and Australian Aboriginals. Indigenous Australian communities experienced systematic displacement from their ancestral territories, subjected to violence and fatalities perpetrated by Scottish colonizers.

=== Colonial period ===
The first Scottish settlers arrived in Australia with the First Fleet in 1788, including three of the first six Governors of New South Wales John Hunter, Lachlan Macquarie (often referred to as the father of Australia) and Thomas Brisbane. The majority of Scots arriving in the early colonial period were convicts: 8,207 Scottish convicts, of the total 150,000 transported to Australia, made up about 5% of the convict population. The Scottish courts were unwilling to punish crimes deemed to be lesser offences in Scots Law by deportation to Australia. Scottish law was considered more humane for lesser offences than the English and Irish legal systems. Although Scottish convicts had a poor reputation, most were convicted of minor property offences and represented a broad cross-section of Scotland's working classes. As such, they brought a range of useful skills to the colonies.

From 1793 to 1795, a group of political prisoners later called the 'Scottish Martyrs', were transported to the colonies. They were not all Scots, but had been tried in Scotland. Their plight as victims of oppression was widely reported and the subsequent escape of one of them, Thomas Muir, in 1796 caused a sensation and inspired the poetry of Robert Burns. The majority of immigrants, 'free settlers', in the late 18th century were Lowlanders from prominent wealthy families. Engineers like Andrew McDougall and John Bowman arrived with experience in building corn mills, while others were drawn to Australia by the prospects of trade. William Douglas Campbell, Robert Campbell, Charles Hook, Alexander Berry Laird of the Shoalhaven, were some of the first merchants drawn to the colonies.

At this time, several Scottish regiments were recorded in the colonies: Macquarie's unit or the 73rd Regiment, the Royal North British Fusiliers, and the King's Own Scottish Borderers. Three of the Deputy Commissaries-General (the highest rank in the colony) from 1813 to 1835 were Scots: David Allan, William Lithgow, Stewart.

By 1830, 15.11% of the colonies' total population were Scots, which increased by the middle of the century to 25,000, or 20-25% of the total population. The Australian Gold Rush of the 1850s provided a further impetus for Scottish migration: in the 1850s 90,000 Scots immigrated, far higher than other British or Irish populations at the time. Literacy rates of the Scottish immigrants ran at 90-95%. By the 1830s a growing number of Scots from the poorer working classes joined the diaspora. Immigrants included skilled builders, tradesmen, engineers, tool-makers and printers. They settled in commercial and industrial cities, Sydney, Adelaide, Hobart and Melbourne. The migration of skilled workers increased, including bricklayers, carpenters, joiners, and stonemasons. They settled in the colonies of Victoria, New South Wales, South Australia and Tasmania.

In the 1840s, Scots-born immigrants constituted 12 percent of the Australian population. Out of the 1.3 million migrants from Britain to Australia in the period from 1861 to 1914, 13.5 percent were Scots. Much settlement followed the Highland Potato Famine, Highland Clearances and the Lowland Clearances of the mid-19th century. By 1860 Scots made up 50% of the ethnic composition of Western Victoria, Adelaide, Penola and Naracoorte. Other settlements in New south Wales included New England, the Hunter Valley and the Illawarra.

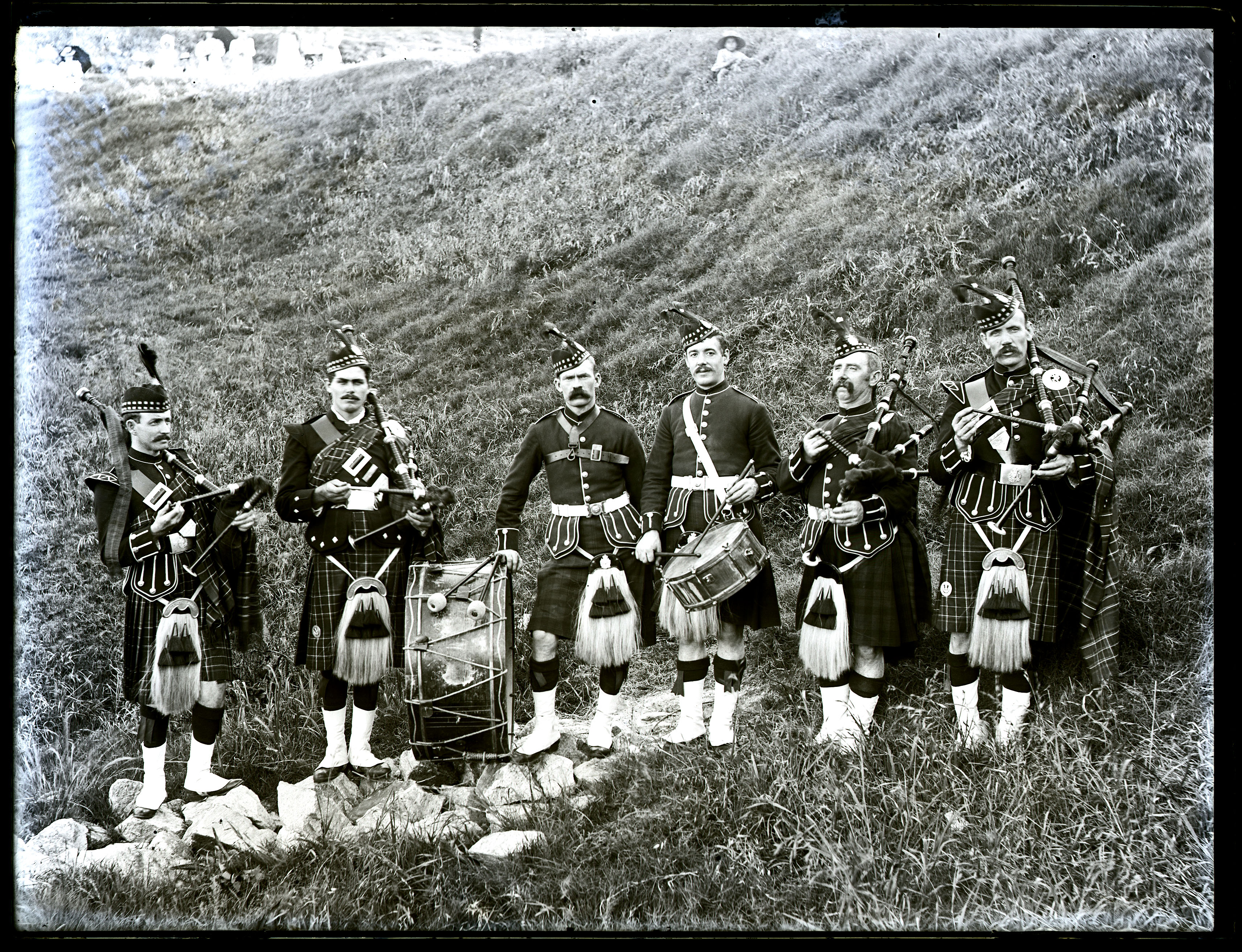
Highland Pipers, Newcastle, New South Wales, 5 November 1898

Their preponderance in pastoral industries on the Australian frontier and in various colonial administrative roles, meant that some Scottish migrants were involved in the injustices against Indigenous Australians throughout the colonial period, including: the dispossession of the indigenous from their lands, the creation of discriminatory administration regimes, and in killings and massacres.

Throughout the 19th century, Scots invested heavily in the industries of the Australian colonies. In the 1820s, the Australian Company of Edinburgh & Leith exported a variety of goods to Australia, but a lack of return cargo led to the company's termination in 1831. The Scottish Australian Investment Company was formed in Aberdeen in 1840, and soon became one of the chief businesses in the colonies, making substantial investments in the pastoral and mining industries. Smaller companies, such as George Russel's Clyde Company and Niel & Company, also had a significant presence in the colonies. Before the 1893 Australian financial crisis, Scotland was the main source of private British loans to Australia.

=== 20th century ===
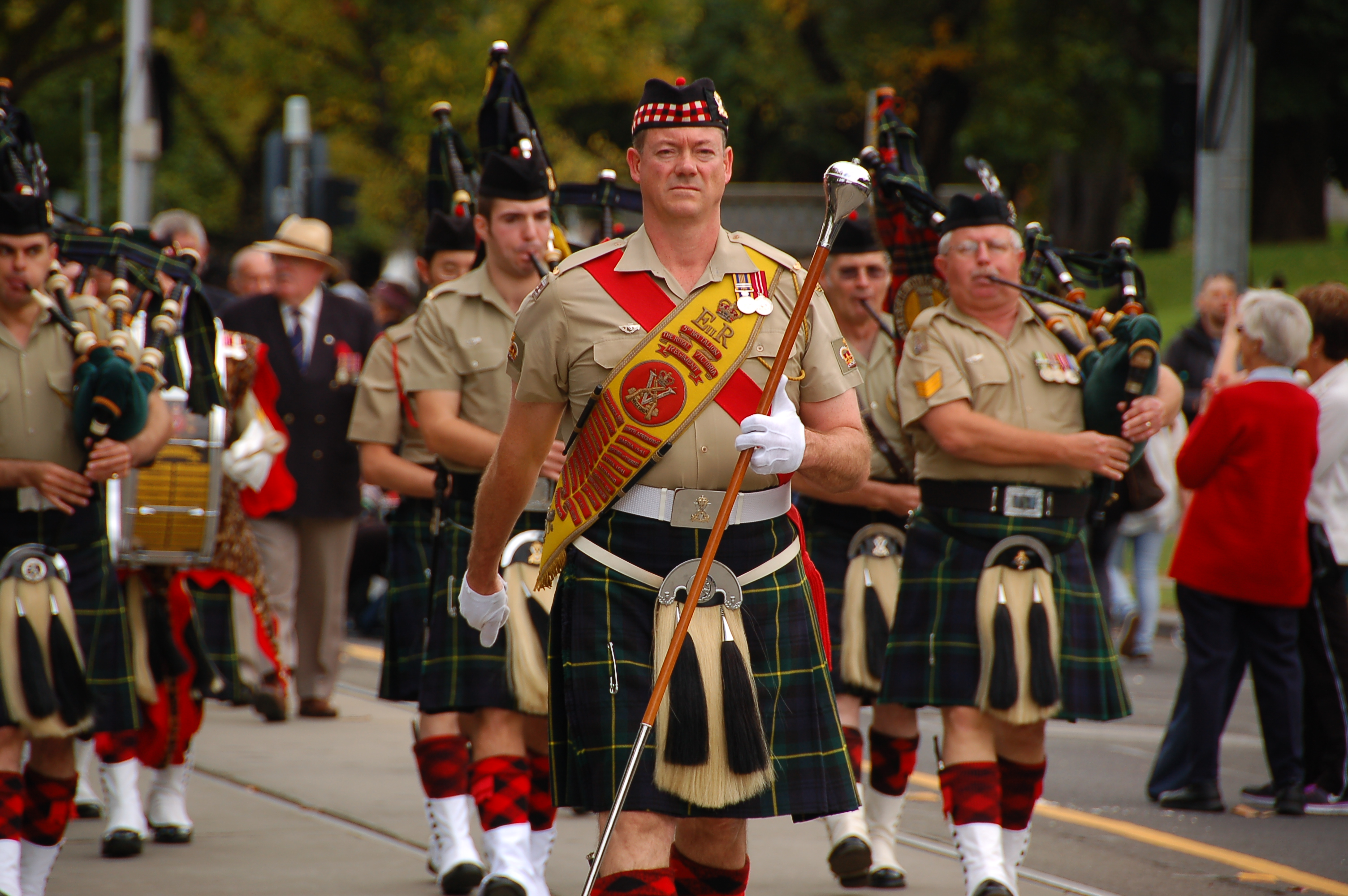
Anzac Day parade in Melbourne, 25 April 2013

A steady rate of Scottish immigration continued into the 20th century, with substantial numbers of Scots continuing to arrive after 1945. Between 1910 and 1914, around 9000 Scots arrived each year, and in 1921 the Scottish population of Australia was 109,000. Due to economic decline in Scotland after the First World War, there was an over-representation of Scots among British migrants to Australia during the interwar period, and by 1933 there were 132,000 Scottish migrants living in Australia.

By the 1920s and 1930s, a majority of Scottish migrants in Australia were living in Victoria and New South Wales. The urban working-class background of many British migrants to Australia in the early 20th century meant that Scots were most likely to settle in industrial portside suburbs, especially in Melbourne and Sydney, where they made notable contributions to the shipbuilding industry. In the late-19th and early-20th century, Scottish-born workers had a significant influence in the labour movement, and played key roles in trade unions and the Australian Labor Party, as well as becoming leaders in the Communist Party of Australia. In 1928, a significant delegation of Scottish Australians to Scotland was influential in the opening of a direct trade route between Australia and Glasgow, and by 1932 traders on the Clyde had reported a three-fold increase in imports from Australia and New Zealand.

Today, a strong cultural Scottish presence is evident in the Highland games, dance, Tartan day celebrations, Clan and Gaelic-speaking societies found throughout modern Australia. In the early 2000s, the number of Australians claiming to have Scottish ancestry increased almost three-fold; the majority of those who claim Scottish ancestry are third or later generation Australians.

== Demographics ==
Self reported Scottish ancestry 1986–2021
Year	Population	Pop. (%)	Ref
1986	740,522	4.7	
2001	540,046	2.9	
2006	1,501,200	7.6	
2011	1,792,622	8.3	
2016	2,023,470	8.7	
2021	2,176,777	8.6	

People with Scottish ancestry as a percentage of the population in Australia divided geographically by statistical local area, as of the 2011 census

=== 2021 ===
The 2021 national census reported that 2,176,777 or 8.7% of the population self reported Scottish ancestry. An increase numerically and percentage over the previous 2011 census.

=== 2011 ===
According to the 2011 Australian census 133,432 Australian residents were born in Scotland, which was 0.6% of the Australian population. This is the fourth most commonly nominated ancestry and represents over 8.3% of the total population of Australia.

=== 2006 ===
At the 2006 Census 130,205 Australian residents stated that they were born in Scotland. Of these 80,604 had Australian citizenship. The majority of residents, 83,503, had arrived in Australia in 1979 or earlier.

== Culture ==
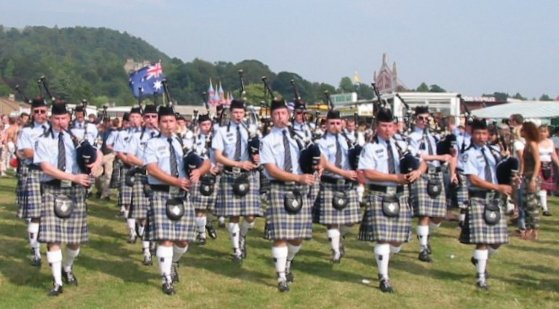
The Western Australia Police Pipe Band at Bridge of Allan Highland Games in Scotland

Some aspects of Scottish culture can be found in Australia:

- Bagpiping and pipe bands.
- Burns Supper
- Ceilidhs
- Hogmanay, the Scottish New Year
- Presbyterianism - the majority of Scottish settlers were Presbyterian, some were Roman Catholic or Episcopalian.
- Tartan, some regions of Australia have their own tartan.
- Tartan Day, in Australia, falls on 1 July, the date of the repeal proclamation in 1792 of the Act of Proscription that banned the wearing of Scottish national dress.

=== Highland gatherings ===
Highland gatherings are popular in Australia. Notable gatherings include:

- Bundanoon, New South Wales established in 1976, claimed to be one of the largest Highland Gatherings in the Southern Hemisphere, and the biggest in Australia.
- Maclean, New South Wales first held in 1904. A gathering that attracts pipe bands from all over Australia and includes massed bands, dancing and a street parade.
- Maryborough, Victoria held since 1857 on New Year's Day

=== Scottish schools ===
The Scots in Australia started a number of schools, some of which are state run, and some of which are private:

- The Scots College, in Bellevue Hill, Sydney, New South Wales.
- Presbyterian Ladies' College PLC in Croydon, New South Wales.
- The Scots PGC College, in Warwick, Queensland, formed by the merger of The Scots College, Warwick and The Presbyterian Girls' College.
- The Scots School Albury, in Albury, New South Wales.
- The Scots School, Bathurst, in Bathurst, New South Wales.
- Presbyterian Ladies' College, Armidale PLCA in Armidale, New South Wales.
- Scotch College, Adelaide, in Torrens Park and Mitcham, South Australia.
- Scotch College, Melbourne, in Hawthorn, Victoria.
- Scotch College, Perth, in Swanbourne, Western Australia.
- Presbyterian Ladies' College, Perth, in Peppermint Grove, Western Australia
- Scotch College, Launceston, in Tasmania; amalgamated with Oakburn College in 1979 to form Scotch Oakburn College.
- Seymour College, Adelaide, South Australia.
- Bagpipe Uni, Melbourne (George), in Victoria Australia

== Scottish placenames ==
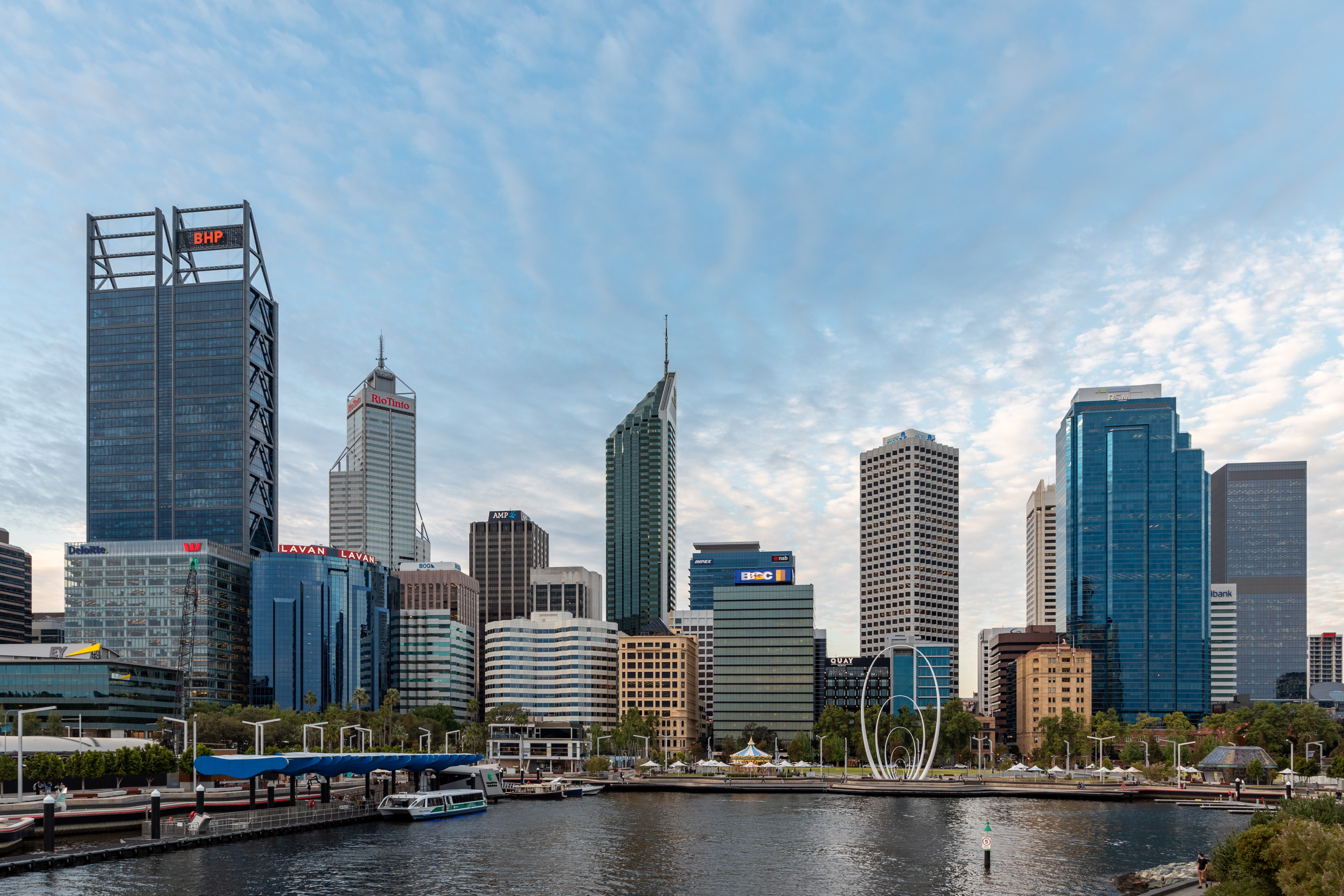
The Perth skyline viewed from Elizabeth Quay

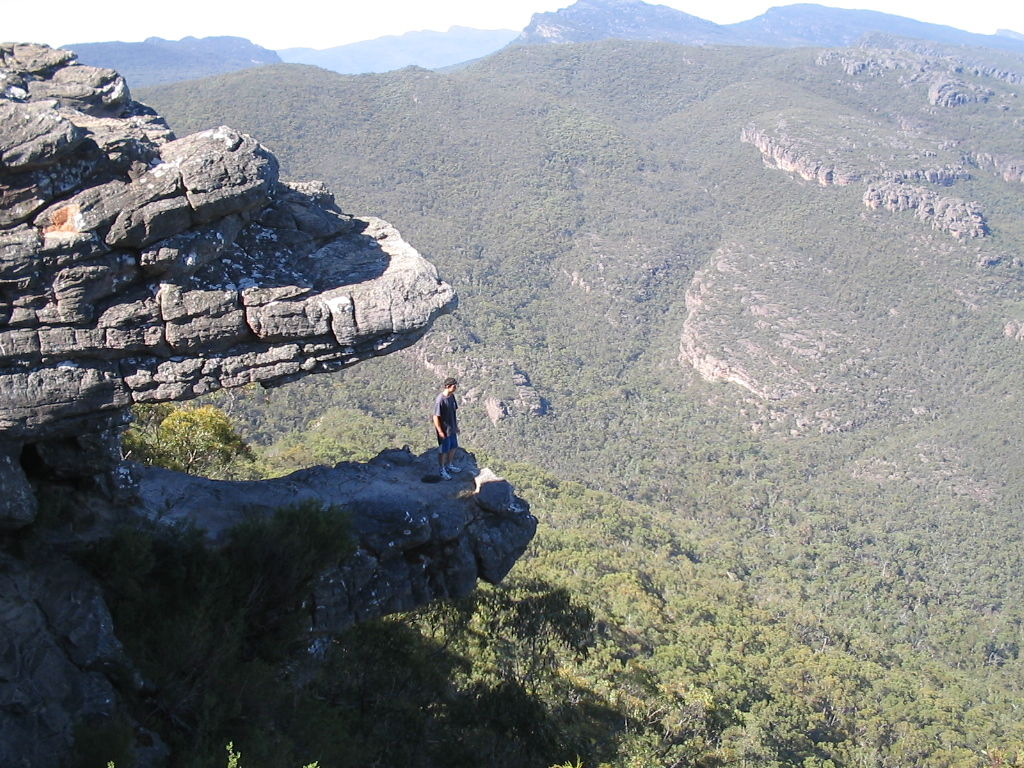
The Balconies (formerly known as the 'Jaws of Death') - Grampians National Park, Victoria, Australia

In Australia, Scottish names make up 17 per cent of all non-Indigenous placenames. Many are of Lowland origins, but Highland names are also common in areas of concentrated Highland settlement. There are also many other landscape features, properties, and streets in Australia with Scottish origins.

Notable Scottish placenames in Australia include:

- Western Australia
  - Perth
  - Albany
  - Marvel Loch, Western Australia
  - Stirling Range
- New South Wales
  - Maclean
  - Ben Lomond
  - Glen Innes
- Northern Territory
  - MacDonnell Ranges
- Queensland
  - Brisbane (Thomas Brisbane)
- South Australia
  - St Kilda
  - Stirling
  - Glenelg
- Tasmania
  - Ben Lomond
  - Lake Mackintosh
  - Suburbs of Hobart-Glenorchy-
    - Glenorchy & City of Glenorchy
- Victoria
  - St. Kilda

=== Places named after Lachlan Macquarie ===
Many places in Australia have been named in Macquarie's honour (some of these were named by Macquarie himself). They include:

At the time of his governorship or shortly thereafter:

- Macquarie Island between Tasmania and Antarctica.
- Lake Macquarie on the coast of New South Wales between Sydney and Newcastle renamed after Macquarie in 1826.
- Macquarie River a significant inland river in New South Wales which passes Bathurst, Wellington, Dubbo and Warren before entering the Macquarie Marshes and the Barwon River.
- Lachlan River, another significant river in New South Wales
- Port Macquarie, a city at the mouth of the Hastings River on the North Coast, New South Wales.
- Macquarie Pass, a route traversing the escarpment between the Illawarra district and the Southern Highlands district of New South Wales.
- Macquarie Rivulet, a river 23 kilometers long which rises near Robertson, New South Wales and drains into Lake Illawarra.
- In Tasmania:
- Macquarie Harbour on the west coast of Tasmania.
- Lachlan a small town named by Sir John Franklin in 1837.
- Macquarie River.
- Macquarie Hill, formerly known as Mount Macquarie, in Wingecarribee Shire, Southern Highlands, New South Wales.
- Macquarie Pass, north-east of Robertson, New South Wales.
- Lachlan Swamps, in Centennial Parklands.

Many years after his governorship:

- Macquarie Park and Macquarie Links, suburbs of Sydney.
- Macquarie, a suburb of Canberra, Australia.
- Division of Macquarie, one of the first 75 Divisions of the Australian House of Representatives created for the Australian Parliament in 1901.

== Notable Australians of Scottish descent ==
Name	Born - Died	Notable for	Connection with Australia	Connection with Scotland
John Mackay	1839–1914	Explorer, blackbirder, harbourmaster	Came to Australia in 1854	Born Inverness, Scotland
Jimmy Chi	1948–2017	Australian composer, musician and playwright	Born in Australia	Ancestor were Scottish.
Margot Robbie	1990–	Australian actress and film producer	Born in Australia	Parents are Scottish.
Isla Fisher	1976–	Hollywood actress	Emigrated to Australia from Scotland in 1982 with her family and was raised in Perth, Western Australia	Born to Scottish parents in Muscat, Oman and spent her early childhood years in Bathgate, Scotland.
Jordan Smith	1989–	Actor	Arrived in 2003	Born and raised in Fife, Scotland. He emigrated to Australia from Scotland at age 14 with his family, where he later became an actor, best known for playing Andrew Robinson in the Australian soap opera Neighbours.
Captain James Cook	1728–1779	Cartographer, navigator and Captain of the Endeavour who made first landfall at Botany Bay and named New South Wales.	Arrived on the Endeavour in 1770	Son of a Scottish ploughman
Air Chief Marshal Allan Grant "Angus" Houston, AC, AFC	1947–	Retired senior officer of the Royal Australian Air Force.	He served as Chief of Air Force (CAF) from 20 June 2001 and then as the Chief of the Defence Force (CDF) from 4 July 2005. He retired from the military on 3 July 2011. Since then Houston has been appointed to a number of positions, including chairman of Airservices Australia. In March 2014 he was appointed to head the Joint Agency Coordination Centre (JACC) during the search for Malaysia Airlines Flight 370.	Houston was born on 9 June 1947 in Ayrshire, Scotland and educated at Strathallan School in Forgandenny, Perthshire, Scotland. He emigrated to Australia in 1968 at age 21.
James Boag I	1804–1890	Founder of Boag's Brewery in Tasmania	Emigrated 1853, settled in Tasmania after some time on the Victorian Gold Fields. Founder and proprietor of J. Boag & Sons, owner of the Boag's Brewery in Launceston, Tasmania, Australia.	Born Paisley, Renfrewshire, Scotland.
Robert McCracken	1813–1885	Brewer and founder of the Essendon Football Club in 1873	Emigrated from Ardwell Farm near Girvan in Ayrshire, Scotland in 1840. The Essendon Club was formed at a meeting at his family home "Ailsa" at Ascot Vale.	Born Ayrshire, Scotland.
Keith Ross Miller	1919–2004	Legendary Australian Test cricketer and St Kilda and Victoria, Australian Rules Footballer	Member of Bradmans 1948 Australian cricket 'Invincibles' touring team to England	His paternal and maternal grandparents were Scottish.
Dave Bryden	1928–2013	Australian Rules Footballer	Member of the 1954 Footscray now Western Bulldogs premiership team	His father was Scottish.
Roy Cazaly	1893–1963	Australian Rules Footballer	Roy Cazaly was a champion ruckman who played for St Kilda (1909–1920) and then South Melbourne (1921–1926). His teammate's constant cry of 'Up there Cazaly' entered the Australian idiom and became part of folk-lore'.	His mother was Elizabeth Jemima, née McNee from Scotland.
Thomas Brisbane	1773–1860	Sixth governor of New South Wales	Appointed governor in 1821	Born near Largs in Ayrshire; educated at University of Edinburgh
John Hunter	1737–1821	Second governor of New South Wales	Arrived with the First Fleet in 1788	born in Leith
Rt Hon. Andrew Fisher	1862–1928	Prime Minister three times, the most successful of Australia's early politicians and started the Commonwealth Bank.	Arrived in Queensland 1885	Born at Crosshouse, Ayrshire, Scotland.
Right Honourable John Malcolm Fraser	1930–2015	Prime Minister.	Born Australia	Father was Scottish
Forby Sutherland	c. 1741–1770	First British born national to be buried in Australia by Captain Cook on his voyage on the Endeavour.	arrived on the Endeavour in 1770	Born Orkney Islands Scotland
James Busby	1801–1871	Grew up in Australia and was key to the peace treaty and negotiations between the British and the united tribes of the Maori in New Zealand.	Arrived in 1824	Born Edinburgh
James Grant	1772–1833	British Royal Navy officer who was the first to sail through Bass Strait from west to east, charting the then unknown coastline and the first European to land on Phillip Island where the south west point is named after him, and Churchill Island.	Arrived in Australia 1800	Born Morayshire Scotland
William Balmain	1762–1803	Naval surgeon who sailed as an assistant surgeon with the First Fleet to establish the first European settlement in Australia, and later became its principal surgeon.	Arrived Port Jackson in January 1788	From Rhynd Perthshire Scotland
Peter Miller Cunningham	1789–1864	Scottish naval surgeon and pioneer in Australia.	Arrived in 1819	From Dumfriesshire Scotland
Robert Campbell	1982–	Australian Rules footballer.	Born in Australia	Ancestors were Scottish.
Elle Macpherson	1964–	Australian supermodel, actress and business woman.	Born in Australia	Ancestors from Scotland.
Sir Francis Forbes	1784–1841	First Chief Justice of the Supreme Court of New South Wales.	Arrived 1820	Parents were Scottish
John Murray	1827–1876	Lieutenant in the Native Police force.	Arrived in Australia 1843	Born Langholm, Scotland
William Lithgow	1784–1864	Auditor General of the colony of Sydney in Australia. The city of Lithgow in New South Wales was named in honour.	Arrived in Sydney 1824	Born Scotland
Colonel William Paterson	1755–1810	Scottish soldier, explorer, and botanist best known for leading early settlement in Tasmania.	Arrived to Australia 1789	Born Montrose Scotland
Charles Frazer	1788–1831	Colonial botanist of New South Wales who collected and catalogued numerous Australian plant species, and participated in a number of exploring expeditions.	Arrived in 1815	From Blair Atholl Perthshire Scotland
Andrew McDougall	1983–	Australian Rules footballer.	Born Australia	Ancestors were Scottish
Rod Wishart	1968–	Australian former rugby league footballer who played for Illawarra Steelers, St. George Illawarra Dragons, New South Wales and Australia.	Born Australia	Ancestors were Scottish
James Alpin McPherson	1842–1895	Explorer and bush ranger, best known as the 'Wild Scotchman'.	Arrived in 1855	Born Inverness-shire Scotland
Paul McGregor	1967–	Australian rugby league footballer, he played for the Illawarra Steelers and, St George Illawarra Dragons and has represented New South Wales in the State of Origin and the Australian national rugby league team.	Born Australia	Ancestors were Scottish
George Reid	1845–1918	Prime Minister of Australia	Arrived Victoria 1852	Born Renfrewshire
Sir Thomas Livingstone Mitchell	1792–1855	Surveyor-General and explorer.	Arrived 1811	From Stirlingshire Scotland
Andrew Petrie	1798–1872	Engineer who made important contributions as a private builder and was the first white Australian to climb Mount Beerwah.	Arrived 1831	Born Fife Scotland
Alexander McLeay	1767–1848	Appointed Colonial Secretary for New South Wales and was the foundation president of the Australian Club.	Arrived with family in 1826	Born Ross-shire Scotland
Margie Abbott	1958–	Spouse of the Prime Minister of Australia and wife of Tony Abbott.	Born in New Zealand and emigrated to Australia	Scottish ancestry from both her parents
Campbell Drummond Riddell	1796–1858	Public servant who served as Colonial Treasurer.	Arrived Sydney 1830	Born Argyllshire, Scotland
John Murray	1775–1807	Scottish naval officer, seaman and explorer, who also made a marked contribution to medicine.	Arrived 1800	Born Edinburgh
Sir Charles Menzies	1783–1866	Officer of marines who became the first commandant at Newcastle secondary Penal establishment.	Arrived 1810	Born at Bal Freike, Perthshire, Scotland
Patrick Logan	1791–1830	Arrived Sydney 1825	From Berwickshire Scotland	
John Stephen	1771–1833	First Puisne Judge of New South Wales who also became the first Solicitor-General.	Arrived 1824	Born Aberdeen Scotland
Robert Brown	1773–1858	Botanist who made extensive collections during Flinders' coastal surveys. Held in high regard by his contemporaries, he received numerous academic honours and made several major discoveries in his subject, including molecular agitation now called 'Brownian movement'.	Arrived 1800	From Aberdeen Scotland
Francis Melville	1822–1857	Francis McCallum, calling himself Captain Francis Melville and posing as a gentleman, he reached Victoria about October 1851. He became a bushranger and claimed leadership of the Mount Macedon gang.	Arrived in the 1830s	Born Inverness-shire
James Macpherson Grant	1822–1885	Politician and prosperous Melbourne solicitor, who became vice-president of the land and works board and commissioner of railways and roads in 1864.	Arrived 1850	Born Scotland
John Flynn (minister)	1880–1951	Presbyterian minister and aviator who founded the Royal Flying Doctor Service, the world's first air ambulance. Appears on the Australian $20 dollar note	Born Melbourne, Victoria.	Minister of the Church of Scotland
Catherine Helen Spence	1825–1910	Author, teacher, journalist, politician (Australia's first female political candidate) and leading suffragette. Appears on the Australian $5 dollar note	Emigrated to South Australia in 1839	Born Melrose Scotland
John Dunmore Lang	1799–1878	Presbyterian clergyman, writer, politician and activist	Arrived Australia 1823 and lived there since that time	Born Scotland
Mary Gilmore	1865–1962	Prominent Australian socialist, poet and journalist. Appears on the Australian $10 dollar note	Born New South Wales	Family were from Scotland
Andrew Barton Paterson	1864–1941	Composer of Australia's most widely known country folk song, Waltzing Matilda features on the Australian $10 dollar note	Born Orange, New South Wales	Father was Andrew Bogle Paterson, a Scottish immigrant from Lanarkshire.
Lachlan Macquarie	1762–1824	Fifth governor of New South Wales	Appointed governor in 1809 (often referred to as the Father of Australia)	Born on the island of Ulva off the coast of the Isle of Mull; buried on the Isle of Mull
Thomas Mitchell	1792–1855	Surveyor and explorer	Arrived Australia 1827	Born Scotland
Nellie Melba	1861–1931	Legendary Australian opera soprano and one of the most famous sopranos, and the first Australian to achieve international recognition in the form. Appears on the Australian $100 dollar note	Born in Melbourne Victoria	Father was a Scottish building contractor
John McDouall Stuart	1815–1866	Surveyor and the most accomplished and most famous of all Australia's inland explorers	Born Dysart, Fife Scotland	
David Lennox	1788–1873	Australian bridge builder, responsible for the construction of historic Lansdowne Bridge over Prospect Creek, Lennox Bridge over the Parramatta River and Lennox Bridge over Brookside Creek at Lapstone as well as a further fifty-three bridges in Victoria.	Arrived 1832 in New South Wales	Born Ayr Scotland
Peter Dodds McCormick	1834?–1916	Composer of the Australian national anthem Advance Australia Fair	Arrived Australia 1855	Born Port Glasgow
Bill Dundee	1943–	Professional wrestler	Arrived Australia 1959	Born Dundee
Bon Scott	1946–1980	AC/DC vocalist	Arrived Australia 1952	Born Forfar and lived in Kirriemuir until the age of 6
Angus Young	1955–	AC/DC guitarist	Arrived Australia 1963	Born Glasgow
Malcolm Young	1953–2017	AC/DC guitarist	Arrived Australia 1963	Born Glasgow
George Young (rock musician)	1946–2017	Easybeats guitarist	Arrived Australia 1963	Born Glasgow
Colin Hay	1953–	Men at Work vocalist	Arrived Australia 1967	Born North Ayrshire
Fely Irvine	1989–	Member of Hi-5 from 2009 to 2011 and successor to Kathleen de Leon Jones and Sun Park	Born in Aberdeen, Scotland	Of half-Filipino and half-Scottish ancestry
Sean Wight	1964–2011	Australian rules footballer	Arrived Australia mid-1980s	Born in Scotland
Roseanna Cunningham	1951–	Scottish National Party politician serving as a Member of the Scottish Parliament	Raised in Perth, Australia	Born in Glasgow
Mary MacKillop	1842–1909	Roman Catholic nun only Australian to be beatified	Born Fitzroy, Victoria	Daughter of Scottish immigrants
Queen Mary of Denmark	1972–	Queen Consort of Denmark	Born Hobart, Tasmania	Father is Scottish-born John Dalgleish Donaldson. Née Mary Donaldson.
Robert Menzies	1894–1978	Prime Minister of Australia	Born Jeparit, Victoria	Scottish grandparents.
Ralph Abercrombie	1881–1957	Public servant who became auditor-general for the Commonwealth.	Born Mount Duneed Victoria	Father was Scottish
Doug Cameron	1951–	Australian Labor Party politician who served as Senator for New South Wales 2008-2019	Arrived in 1973	Born Bellshill, Scotland
Kaiya Jones	1996–	Actress	Arrived in 2004	Born Glasgow, Scotland
Jamie Young	1985–	Footballer	Born in Brisbane	Of Scottish descent
Abbey Lee	1987–	Actress and Model	Born in Melbourne.	Of Scottish descent
Jackson Irvine	1993–	Footballer	Born in Melbourne. Began career with Scottish-Australian club Frankston Pines and plays for the Australian national football team	Father is Scottish. Played for Celtic F.C. in the Scottish Premiership
Miranda Kerr	1983–	Model	Born in Sydney. Victoria's Secret Angel from 2007 to 2012.	Kerr stated that her ancestry is mostly English, with smaller amounts of Scottish and French.
Calum Hood	1996–	Bassist	Born in Sydney. Bassist and backing singer in Australian band 5 Seconds of Summer.	Hood has stated that his dad is of Scottish descent.
Catriona Gray	1994–	Model, beauty pageant titleholder represented the Philippines including Miss Universe 2018	Born in Cairns to Filipino immigrant mother	Father is of Scottish descent.
Steven M. Smith	1951-	Biologist	Worked at CSIRO Canberra 1980–82, Migrated in 2005 as an Australian Research Council Federation Fellow. Australian citizen 2007. Employed at the University of Western Australia and subsequently at the University of Tasmania.	Mother born in Paisley, wife born in Falkirk, daughter born in Edinburgh. Employed at the University of Edinburgh 1983–2004. Married in Glasgow 1997. Drummer in the City of Hobart Highland Pipe Band.

== See also ==
- Scottish diaspora
- Anglo-Celtic Australians
- Scottish placenames in Australia
- English Australians
