= Demographics of Australia =

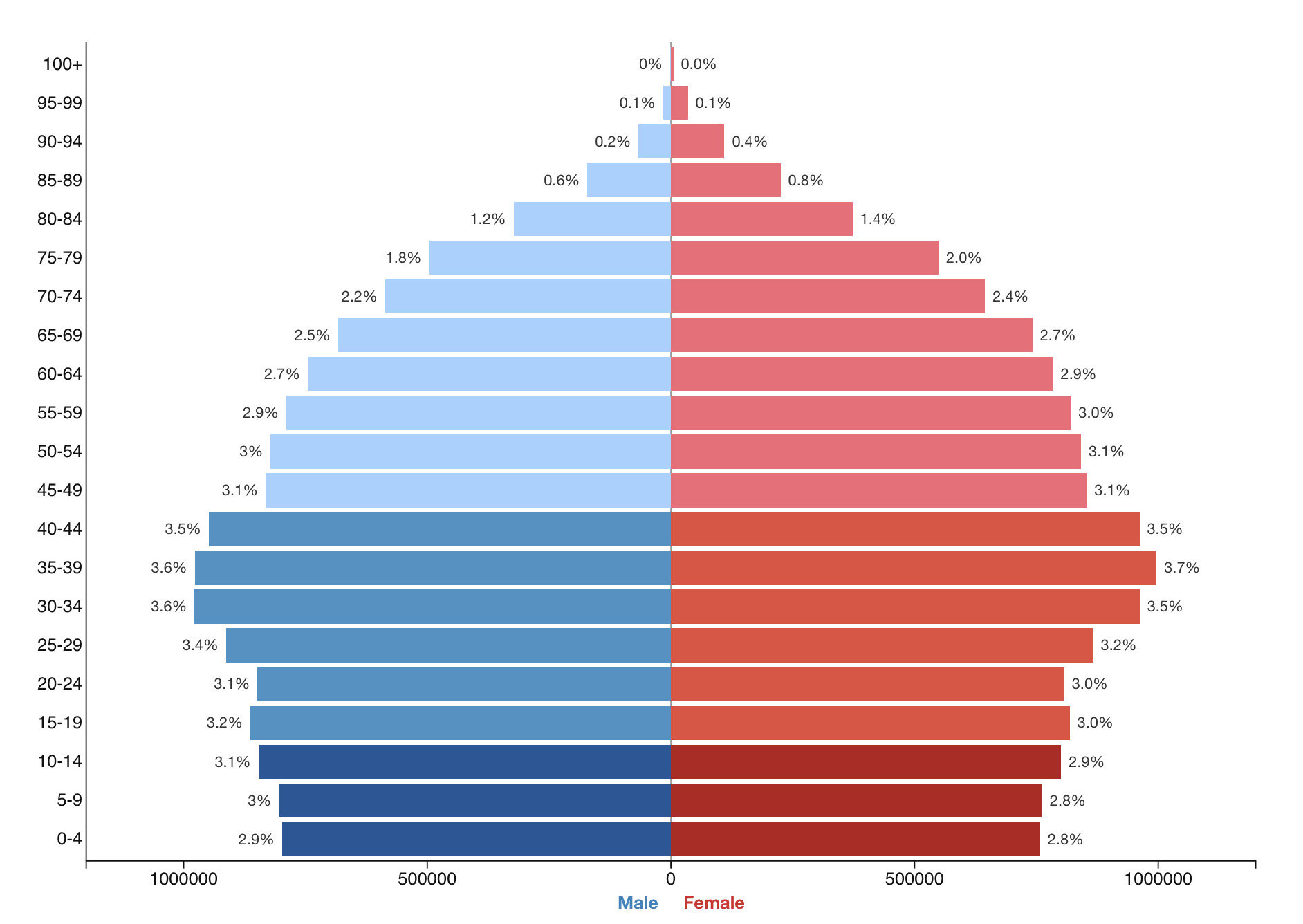
- Population pyramid of Australia in 2026
- Population: 27,994,737 (as of 25 June 2026)
- Growth rate: 1.60% (2023 est.)
- Birth rate: 12.3 births/1,000 population
- Death rate: 6.77 deaths/1,000 population
- Life expectancy: 83.09 years
  - male: 80.93 years
  - female: 85.36 years
- Fertility rate: 1.42 children
- Infant mortality: 3.01 deaths/1,000 live births
- Net migration rate: 6.93 migrant(s)/1,000 population
- Immigrant share: 30.4% (2024)

Age structure
- 0–14 years: ▼17.7% (2025 est.)
- 15–64 years: ▼64.2% (2025 est.)
- 65 and over: ▲18.1% (2025 est.)

Sex ratio
- Total: 0.99 male(s)/female (2022 est.)
- At birth: 1.05 male(s)/female

Nationality
- Nationality: Australian
- Major ethnic: European (54.65%) (Note: Lowest range value as it only represents the percentage of Australians who nominated at least one European Ancestry. This is likely an undercount and should incorporate the additional Australians who nominated only Australian as an ancestry.); Anglo-Celtic (51.63%) (Note: Due to the option to nominate up to two ancestries, the total amount of those that nominated an Anglo-Celtic Ancestry is lower than the summation of each individual ancestry); English (32.99%); Irish (9.48%); Scottish (8.56%); Welsh (0.60%); German (4.04%); Dutch (1.50%); South & East European (10.52%) (Note: Due to the option to nominate up to two ancestries, the total amount of those that nominated a Southern & Eastern European Ancestry is lower than the summation of each individual ancestry); Italian (4.36%); Greek (1.67%); Polish (0.82%); Maltese (0.78%); Croatian (0.65%); Others (3.27%); Australian ancestry (14.82%) (Note: The Australian Bureau of Statistics has stated that most who nominate "Australian" as their ancestry have at least partial Anglo-Celtic ancestry.)
- Minor ethnic: Asian (without the Middle East) (17.02%) (Note: Due to the option to nominate up to two ancestries, the total amount of those that nominated an Asian Ancestry is lower than the summation of each individual ancestry); Chinese (5.47%); Indian (3.08%); Filipino (1.61%); Vietnamese (1.32%); Nepalese (0.54%); Korean (0.54%); Baloch (0.1%); Others (4.86%); Indigenous (3.08%) (Note: Due to the option to nominate up to two ancestries, the total amount of those that nominated an Indigenous Australian Ancestry is lower than the summation of each individual ancestry); Aboriginal Australians (2.92%); Torres Strait Islanders (0.26%); Others (0.69%); Middle Eastern and North African (2.97%) (Note: Due to the option to nominate up to two ancestries, the total amount of those that nominated a Middle Eastern or North African Ancestry is lower than the summation of each individual ancestry); Lebanese (0.98%); Turkish (0.34%); Iranian (0.32%); Egyptian (0.24%); Iraqi (0.23%); Others (1.84%); Pacific Islander (1.61%) (Note: Due to the option to nominate up to two ancestries, the total amount of those that nominated a Pacific Islander Ancestry is lower than the summation of each individual ancestry); Māori (0.67%); Samoan (0.39%); Fijian (0.19%); Tongan (0.17%); Others (0.33%); Sub-Saharan African (1.57%) (Note: Likely an overcount in terms of Australians of Sub-Saharan descent/ethnicity as this figure includes ancestries such as South African which is predominantly made up of South Africans of European descent); South African (0.57%); African (0.22%) (Note: As described on the 2021 ABS Census); Mauritian (0.14%); Others (0.82%); The Americas (1.16%); American (0.29%); Canadian (0.17%); Brazilian (0.14%); Colombian (0.13%); Others (0.43%); New Zealander (0.80%); Jewish (0.44%); Afrikaner (0.02%); Other ancestries (1.42%)

Language
- Official: English
- Spoken: English (72.00%); Mandarin (2.70%); Arabic (1.44%); Vietnamese (1.26%); Others (16.87%)

The population of Australia is estimated to be 27,994,736 as of 26 June 2026. It is the 54th most populous country in the world and the most populous Oceanian country. Its population is concentrated mainly in urban areas, particularly on the Eastern, South Eastern and Southern seaboards, and is expected to exceed 30 million by 2031.

Australia's population has grown from an estimated population of between 300,000 and 2,400,000 Indigenous Australians at the time of British colonisation in 1788 due to numerous waves of immigration during the period since. Also due to immigration, the European component's share of the population rose sharply in the late 18th and 19th centuries, but is now declining as a percentage.

Australia has an average population density of 3.7 persons per square kilometre of total land area, which makes it one of the most sparsely populated countries in the world. This is generally attributed to the semi-arid and desert geography of much of the interior of the country. Another factor is urbanisation—with 89% of its population living in a handful of urban areas, Australia is one of the world's most urbanised countries. The life expectancy of Australia in 2015–2017 was 83.2 years, among the highest in the world.

== Population ==
Estimated resident population of Australia since 1981

Population estimates in the table below do not include the Aboriginal population before 1961. Estimates of Aboriginal population before European settlement range from 300,000 to one million, with archaeological finds indicating a sustainable maximum population of around 750,000. Where available, actual population figures from census years are included.

=== Population growth rates ===
Australia is continuing to grow, with the annual growth rate being 423,400 people or 1.6% in March 2025. The quarterly growth rate in 2025 was 0.5% or 144,238 people. As of 31 March 2025, all Australian states and territories reported positive population growth. Tasmania had the slowest population growth rate of 0.2% as of March 2025.Western Australia had the fastest population growth rate of 2.3% as of March 2025. As of 31 March 2025, Australia had a positive natural increase of 107,400 people. This is an increase of 2,000 people or 1.9% since 31 March 2024.Natural increase is the number of births minus the number of deaths in an area. The state of Victoria had the highest natural increase of 33,730 people in the year ending on 31 March 2025. Tasmania had the lowest natural increase of 179 people in the year ending on 31 March 2025.

Historic population (estimated)

Pre-1788
Year	Indigenous population	±%
pre 1788	300,000 to 1,000,000	—

Settlement – Federation
Year	Non-indigenous population	±% p.a.
1788	859	—
1798	4,588	+18.24%
1808	10,263	+8.38%
1818	25,859	+9.68%
1828	58,197	+8.45%
1838	151,868	+10.07%
1848	332,328	+8.15%
1858	1,050,828	+12.20%
1868	1,539,552	+3.89%
1878	2,092,164	+3.11%
1888	2,981,677	+3.61%
1898	3,664,715	+2.08%

Settlement – Post-Federation
Year	Non-indigenous population	±%
1901	3,788,123	—
1906	4,059,083	+7.2%
1911	4,489,545	+10.6%
1916	4,943,173	+10.1%
1921	5,455,136	+10.4%
1926	6,056,360	+11.0%
1931	6,526,485	+7.8%
1936	6,778,372	+3.9%
1941	7,109,898	+4.9%
1946	7,465,157	+5.0%
1951	8,421,775	+12.8%
1956	9,425,563	+11.9%
Note: Estimated populations prior to 1961 do not include the Indigenous population. Source:

Post-Federation
Year	Pop.	±%
1961	10,548,267	—
1966	11,599,498	+10.0%
1971	13,067,265	+12.7%
1976	14,033,083	+7.4%
1981	14,923,260	+6.3%
1986	16,018,350	+7.3%
1991	17,284,036	+7.9%
1996	18,224,767	+5.4%
2001	18,769,249	+3.0%
2006	19,855,288	+5.8%
2011	21,507,717	+8.3%
2016	23,401,892	+8.8%
2021	25,417,978	+8.6%

=== Population by age ===
Population pyramid of Australia from 1950 to 2020

Source: Australian Bureau of Statistics.

Ages	1901	1911	1921	1931	1941	1951	1961	1971	1981	1991	2001	2007	2016
0–14 years	35.1	31.6	31.8	28.5	24.2	27.2	30.3	28.7	25.0	21.9	20.5	19.4	18.6
15–24 years	19.4	20.1	16.9	18.1	17.5	14.1	14.3	17.4	17.4	16.0	13.7	14.0	12.8
25–44 years	29.4	28.8	30.0	29.3	30.0	29.4	27.7	27.4	28.4	28.6	30.0	29.2	27.9
45–64 years	12.0	14.8	17.0	18.0	20.9	20.4	19.9	20.0	19.2	19.3	23.1	25.0	25.1
65 years and over	4.0	4.3	4.5	6.1	7.4	8.1	8.5	8.3	9.8	11.3	12.6	13.2	15.8
Total (%)	100	99.6	100	100	100	100	100	100	100	100	100	100	100

=== Median age ===
Map of the median age of Australians by Statistical Local Area in the 2011 census

Median age of the Australian population through history. Source: Australian Bureau of Statistics.

Years	1901	1911	1921	1951	1961	1971	1981	1991	2001	2015	2017
Median age of the total population	22.5	24.0	25.8	30.3	29.3	27.7	29.6	32.4	35.7	37.4	38.7
Median age of males	23.6	24.6	26.1	29.9	28.7	27.0	29.0	31.7	34.9		37.9
Median age of females	21.5	23.4	25.5	30.8	30.2	28.3	30.2	33.0	36.4		39.5

=== Structure of the population ===
Australian babies: 0 year olds as a fraction of total persons, in Australia, according to the 2011 census results

Australian babies: 0–4 year olds as a fraction of total persons, in Australia, according to the 2011 census results

Population by sex and age group (Census 09.VIII.2016) (These data sets have been randomly rounded to protect confidentiality. Individual figures may not add up to totals, and values for the same data may vary in different tables.):

Age group	Male	Female	Total	%
Total	11 546 638	11 855 248	23 401 892	100
0–4	752 142	712 638	1 464 779	6.26
5–9	771 055	731 592	1 502 646	6.42
10–14	717 629	679 553	1 397 183	5.97
15–19	727 677	693 915	1 421 595	6.07
20–24	795 423	771 369	1 566 793	6.70
25–29	824 084	840 525	1 664 602	7.11
30–34	839 821	864 026	1 703 847	7.28
35–39	773 132	788 548	1 561 679	6.67
40–44	777 702	805 551	1 583 257	6.77
45–49	773 170	808 282	1 581 455	6.76
50–54	748 954	774 601	1 523 551	6.51
55–59	709 115	745 214	1 454 332	6.21
60–64	632 357	667 048	1 299 397	5.55
65–69	581 230	607 766	1 188 999	5.08
70–74	431 325	456 390	887 716	3.79
75–79	307 441	345 217	652 657	2.79
80–84	204 026	256 529	460 549	1.97
85–89	123 502	185 463	308 960	1.32
90–94	46 828	93 570	140 398	0.60
95–99	9 244	24 672	33 920	0.14
100+	777	2 788	3 569	0.02
Age group	Male	Female	Total	Percent
0–14	2 240 826	2 123 783	4 364 609	18.65
15–64	7 601 439	7 759 070	15 360 509	65.64
65+	1 704 373	1 972 395	3 676 768	15.71

=== Population density ===
>50% of Australia's population lives in the red LGAs.

As of June 2022, the population density of Australia was reported as 3.4/km^{2} (8.8/sq mi). This makes Australia the 3rd least densely populated country in the world, after Namibia and Mongolia.

=== Migration ===
The major contributor to the positive population growth in Australia was the positive net overseas migration. Net overseas migration is the number of overseas arrivals minus the number of overseas departures. New South Wales had the highest net overseas migration of 96,761 people for the year ending on 31 March 2025. Tasmania had the lowest net overseas migration of 3,182 people for the year ending on 31 March 2025.

Another aspect of population change within Australian states and territories is the net interstate migration. Net interstate migration is the interstate arrivals minus the interstate departures, so this only affects population changes between states and territories in Australia. Queensland had the greatest net interstate migration of 24,015 people as of 31 March 2025. New South Wales had the lowest net interstate migration of −26,560 people as of 31 March 2025. New South Wales recorded a negative net interstate migration, meaning more people left than entered.

State/territory	Population (June 2023 estimate)	Land area		Population density		% of total national population	% of population living in capital	Notes
State/territory	Population (June 2023 estimate)	km²	mi²	per km²	per mi²	% of total national population	% of population living in capital	Notes
New South Wales	8,339,300	800,642	309,130	8.64	22	32%	63%	
Victoria	6,812,500	227,416	87,806	23.54	61	26%	71%	
Queensland	5,459,400	1,730,648	668,207	2.50	6	20%	46%	
Western Australia	2,878,600	2,239,170	864,548	0.89	2	9%	73.4%	
South Australia	1,851,700	983,482	379,725	1.62	4	8%	73.5%	
Tasmania	572,800	68,401	26,410	7.24	19	2%	41%	
Australian Capital Territory	466,800	2,358	910	151.49	392	2%	100%	
Northern Territory	252,500	1,349,129	520,902	0.16	0.4	1%	54%	

=== Cities ===
Australia contains five cities (including their suburbs) that consist of over one million people. Most of Australia's population live close to coastlines.

Largest populated areas in Australia 2023 data from Australian Bureau of Statistics
Rank	Name	State	Pop.	Rank	Name	State	Pop.
1	Sydney	NSW	5,450,496	11	Wollongong	NSW	313,745
2	Melbourne	VIC	5,207,145	12	Geelong	VIC	302,046
3	Brisbane	QLD	2,706,966	13	Hobart	TAS	253,654
4	Perth	WA	2,309,338	14	Townsville	QLD	186,734
5	Adelaide	SA	1,446,380	15	Cairns	QLD	160,933
6	Gold Coast–Tweed Heads	QLD&NSW	735,213	16	Darwin	NT	150,736
7	Newcastle–Maitland	NSW	526,515	17	Toowoomba	QLD	149,817
8	Canberra–Queanbeyan	ACT&NSW	503,402	18	Ballarat	VIC	116,390
9	Sunshine Coast	QLD	407,859	19	Bendigo	VIC	104,883
10	Central Coast	NSW	354,803	20	Albury-Wodonga	NSW&VIC	100,095

View source data.
View source data.
View source data.

=== Total fertility rate ===
View source data.

The total fertility rate is the number of children born per woman. It is based on fairly good data for the entire period. Sources: Our World In Data and Gapminder Foundation.

The following figures show the total fertility rates since the first years of British colonisation.

Total fertility rate in Australia
1850s	1850	1851	1852	1853	1854	1855	1856	1857	1858	1859
1850s	4.94	5.01	4.07	5.03	4.86	5.32	5.19	5.63	5.71	5.75
1860s	1860	1861	1862	1863	1864	1865	1866	1867	1868	1869
1860s	5.71	5.67	5.8	5.59	5.75	5.64	5.33	5.41	5.43	5.19
1870s	1870	1871	1872	1873	1874	1875	1876	1877	1878	1879
1870s	5.19	5.09	4.97	5.01	4.93	4.81	4.81	4.69	4.74	4.8
1880s	1880	1881	1882	1883	1884	1885	1886	1887	1888	1889
1880s	4.73	4.73	4.62	4.66	4.77	4.78	4.74	4.77	4.76	4.65
1890s	1890	1891	1892	1893	1894	1895	1896	1897	1898	1899
1890s	4.69	4.62	4.52	4.4	4.13	4.07	3.81	3.78	3.64	3.66

== Vital statistics ==
Notable events in Australian demographics:

- 1852–1861 – Gold rush
- 1946–1964 – Post-World War II baby boom

	Average population (Note: June 1 from 1900 to 2016, since 2017 Dec 31)	Live births	Deaths	Natural change	Crude birth rate (per 1,000)	Crude death rate (per 1,000)	Natural change (per 1,000)	Crude migration change (per 1,000)	Total fertility rate (Note: In fertility rates, 2.1 and above is a stable population and has been marked blue, 2 and below leads to an aging population and the result is that the population decreases.)	Net overseas migration
1852	438,000	16,381	6,088	10,293	37.4	13.9	23.5		4.07	
1853	514,000	18,021	8,995	9,026	35.1	17.5	17.6	138.1	5.03	
1854	601,000	22,538	14,134	8,404	37.5	23.5	14.0	139.9	4.86	
1855	695,000	25,229	15,161	10,068	36.3	21.8	14.5	132.1	5.32	
1856	793,000	31,532	14,978	16,554	39.7	18.9	20.8	118.2	5.19	
1857	877,000	33,920	13,155	20,765	38.7	15.0	23.7	80.8	5.63	
1858	970,000	40,740	15,908	24,832	42.0	16.4	25.6	78.2	5.71	
1859	1,051,000	44,733	19,221	25,512	42.6	18.3	24.3	55.6	5.75	
1860	1,097,000	47,031	19,098	27,933	42.9	17.4	25.5	19.1	5.71	
1861	1,146,000	48,820	23,921	24,899	42.6	20.9	21.7	18.8	5.67	
1862	1,168,000	49,386	20,186	29,200	42.3	17.3	25.0	−2.5	5.80	
1863	1,207,000	52,193	21,263	30,930	43.3	17.6	25.7	8.3	5.59	
1864	1,259,000	52,530	21,791	30,739	41.7	17.3	24.4	17.1	5.75	
1865	1,325,000	56,893	21,573	35,320	42.9	16.3	26.6	27.3	5.64	
1866	1,390,000	58,519	23,074	35,445	42.1	16.6	25.5	21.9	5.33	
1867	1,444,000	57,431	26,858	30,573	39.8	18.6	21.2	13.1	5.41	
1868	1,484,000	59,954	27,157	32,797	40.4	18.3	22.1	6.4	5.43	
1869	1,540,000	62,370	23,870	38,500	40.5	15.5	25.0	15.3	5.19	
1870	1,592,000	61,451	23,402	38,049	38.6	14.7	23.9	8.9	5.19	
1871	1,648,000	63,758	23,442	40,316	38.7	14.2	24.5	9.7	5.09	
1872	1,701,000	64,638	22,457	42,181	38.0	13.2	24.8	6.5	4.97	
1873	1,743,000	64,665	25,274	39,391	37.1	14.5	22.6	1.3	5.01	
1874	1,795,000	67,157	26,387	40,770	37.4	14.7	22.7	6.3	4.93	
1875	1,849,000	67,991	29,779	38,212	36.8	16.1	20.7	8.7	4.81	
1876	1,898,000	68,088	37,321	30,767	35.9	19.7	16.2	9.7	4.81	
1877	1,959,000	70,358	34,538	35,820	35.9	17.6	18.3	13.1	4.69	
1878	2,031,000	71,085	32,603	38,482	35.0	15.9	18.9	16.8	4.74	
1879	2,092,000	74,057	34,124	39,933	35.4	16.3	19.1	10.2	4.80	
1880	2,161,000	77,364	31,667	45,697	35.8	14.7	21.2	11.0	4.73	
1881	2,232,000	78,566	32,563	46,003	35.2	14.6	20.6	11.4	4.73	
1882	2,307,000	81,548	33,939	47,609	35.3	14.7	20.6	12.1	4.62	
1883	2,388,000	82,386	38,208	44,178	34.5	16.0	18.5	15.7	4.66	
1884	2,506,000	87,209	38,842	48,367	34.8	15.3	19.3	28.5	4.77	
1885	2,606,000	92,774	42,999	49,775	35.6	16.5	19.1	19.7	4.78	
1886	2,695,000	96,212	43,120	53,092	35.7	16.0	19.7	13.6	4.74	
1887	2,788,000	98,695	42,935	55,760	35.4	15.4	20.0	13.6	4.77	
1888	2,881,000	102,564	42,063	60,501	35.6	14.6	21.0	11.5	4.76	
1889	2,982,000	105,861	43,537	62,324	35.5	14.6	20.9	13.2	4.65	
1890	3,062,000	106,251	47,155	59,096	34.7	15.4	19.3	6.9	4.69	
1891	3,151,000	110,285	45,059	65,226	35.0	14.3	20.7	7.6	4.62	
1892	3,241,000	111,815	47,961	63,854	34.5	14.8	19.7	8.2	4.52	
1893	3,306,000	111,412	42,647	68,765	33.7	12.9	20.8	−1.2	4.40	
1894	3,362,000	110,274	46,045	64,229	32.8	13.7	19.1	−2.5	4.13	
1895	3,427,000	105,552	43,545	62,007	30.8	12.7	18.1	0.9	4.07	
1896	3,492,000	106,157	43,650	62,507	30.4	12.5	17.9	0.7	3.81	
1897	3,553,000	100,911	45,478	55,433	28.4	12.8	15.6	1.6	3.78	
1898	3,618,000	102,068	43,778	58,290	28.2	12.1	16.1	1.9	3.64	
1899	3,665,000	99,462	51,677	47,785	27.1	14.1	13.0	−0.2	3.66	
1900	3,715,000	102,221	44,060	58,161	27.3	11.8	15.5	−2.2	3.66	
1901	3,765,000	102,945	46,330	56,615	27.1	12.2	14.9	−1.6	3.64	
1902	3,824,000	102,776	48,078	54,698	26.7	12.5	14.2	1.4	3.39	
1903	3,875,000	98,443	47,293	51,150	25.3	12.1	13.2	12.0	3.58	
1904	3,916,000	104,113	43,572	60,541	26.4	11.0	15.4	−4.9	3.54	
1905	3,974,000	104,941	43,514	61,427	26.2	10.9	15.3	−0.6	3.51	
1906	4,032,000	107,890	44,333	63,557	26.6	10.9	15.7	−1.2	3.35	
1907	4,091,000	110,347	45,305	55,042	26.7	11.0	15.7	1.2	3.35	
1908	4,161,000	111,545	46,426	55,119	26.6	11.1	15.5	3.9	3.35	
1909	4,232,000	114,071	44,172	59,899	26.7	10.3	16.4	2.9	3.35	
1910	4,323,000	116,801	45,590	61,211	26.7	10.4	16.3	7.3	3.35	
1911	4,425,000	122,193	47,869	74,324	27.2	10.6	16.6	6.8	3.51	
1912	4,573,000	133,088	52,177	80,911	28.6	11.2	17.4	15.8	3.51	
1913	4,820,172	135,714	51,789	83,925	28.2	10.7	17.5	36.6	3.51	
1914	4,893,000	137,983	51,720	86,263	28.0	10.5	17.5	−2.5	3.51	
1915	4,971,000	134,871	52,782	82,089	27.1	10.6	16.5	−0.6	3.51	
1916	4,969,000	131,426	54,197	77,219	26.6	11.0	15.6	−15.9	3.07	
1917	4,917,000	129,965	48,029	81,936	26.3	9.7	16.6	−27.1	3.35	
1918	4,982,000	125,739	50,249	75,490	25.0	10.0	15.0	−1.9	3.07	
1919	5,080,000	122,290	65,930	56,360	23.6	12.7	10.9	8.6	3.07	
1920	5,303,000	136,406	56,289	80,117	25.5	10.5	15.5	28.8	3.07	
1921	5,411,000	136,198	54,076	82,122	24.9	9.9	15.0	5.2	3.12	
1922	5,510,000	137,496	51,311	86,185	24.7	9.2	15.5	2.7	3.11	
1923	5,637,000	135,222	56,236	78,986	23.7	9.9	13.8	9.0	3.02	
1924	5,755,000	134,927	54,980	79,953	23.2	9.4	13.8	7.0	2.97	
1925	5,882,000	135,792	54,658	81,134	22.9	9.2	13.7	8.3	2.95	
1926	6,000,000	133,162	56,952	76,210	22.0	9.4	12.6	7.4	2.85	
1927	6,124,000	133,698	58,282	75,716	21.6	9.4	12.2	8.3	2.80	
1928	6,251,000	134,078	59,378	74,700	21.3	9.4	11.9	8.8	2.77	
1929	6,355,000	129,480	60,857	68,623	20.2	9.5	10.7	5.8	2.64	
1930	6,436,000	128,399	55,331	73,068	19.8	8.6	11.2	1.4	2.58	
1931	6,500,000	118,509	56,560	61,949	18.2	8.7	9.5	0.4	2.36	
1932	6,552,000	110,933	56,757	54,176	16.9	8.6	8.3	−0.3	2.19	
1933	6,603,000	111,269	59,117	52,152	16.8	8.9	7.9	−0.1	2.17	
1934	6,656,000	109,475	62,229	47,246	16.4	9.3	7.1	0.9	2.11	
1935	6,707,000	111,325	63,599	47,726	16.5	9.4	7.1	0.5	2.12	
1936	6,755,000	116,073	63,932	52,141	17.1	9.4	7.7	−0.6	2.18	
1937	6,810,000	119,131	64,496	54,635	17.4	9.4	8.0	0.1	2.21	
1938	6,871,000	120,415	66,451	53,964	17.4	9.6	7.8	1.1	2.21	
1939	6,935,000	122,891	69,147	53,744	17.6	9.9	7.7	1.6	2.22	
1940	7,004,000	126,347	68,384	57,963	17.9	9.7	8.2	1.7	2.26	
1941	7,077,000	134,525	71,176	63,349	18.9	10.0	8.9	1.5	2.36	
1942	7,143,000	136,708	75,191	61,517	19.1	10.5	8.6	0.7	2.38	
1943	7,201,000	149,295	74,486	74,809	20.6	10.3	10.3	−2.3	2.57	
1944	7,269,000	153,344	69,596	83,748	21.0	9.5	11.5	−2.1	2.63	
1945	7,347,000	160,560	70,231	90,229	21.7	9.5	12.2	−1.6	2.74	
1946	7,430,000	176,379	74,661	101,718	23.6	10.0	13.6	−2.4	2.99	
1947	7,517,000	182,384	73,468	108,916	24.1	9.7	14.4	−2.8	3.08	
1948	7,637,000	177,976	76,839	101,137	23.1	10.0	13.1	2.7	2.98	
1949	7,792,000	181,261	75,260	106,001	22.9	9.5	13.4	6.7	2.99	
1950	8,045,000	190,591	78,187	112,404	23.3	9.6	13.7	18.5	3.01	
1951	8,307,000	193,298	81,788	111,510	23.0	9.7	13.3	31.2	3.06	
1952	8,527,000	201,650	81,597	120,053	23.4	9.5	13.9	12.4	3.15	
1953	8,739,000	202,235	80,188	122,047	22.9	9.1	13.8	10.9	3.23	
1954	8,902,000	202,256	81,805	120,451	22.5	9.1	13.4	5.1	3.3	
1955	9,089,000	207,677	82,036	125,641	22.6	8.9	13.7	7.2	3.35	
1956	9,311,000	212,633	86,088	126,545	22.5	9.1	13.4	10.8	3.39	
1957	9,530,000	220,358	84,953	135,405	22.9	8.8	14.1	9.3	3.41	
1958	9,744,000	222,504	83,723	138,481	22.6	8.5	14.1	8.2	3.42	
1959	9,947,000	226,976	89,212	137,765	22.6	8.9	13.7	7.0	3.41	
1960	10,160,000	230,326	88,464	141,862	22.4	8.6	13.8	7.5	3.39	
1961	10,391,000	239,986	88,961	151,025	22.8	8.5	14.3	8.2	3.35	
1962	10,642,000	237,081	93,163	143,918	22.1	8.7	13.4	10.6	3.3	
1963	10,846,000	235,689	94,894	140,795	21.5	8.7	12.8	6.2	3.24	
1964	11,055,000	229,149	100,594	128,555	20.5	8.7	11.8	7.6	3.17	
1965	11,280,000	222,854	99,715	123,139	19.6	8.8	10.8	9.4	2.97	
1966	11,505,000	223,731	103,929	119,802	19.3	9.0	10.3	9.5	2.89	
1967	11,704,000	229,796	102,703	127,093	19.4	8.7	10.7	6.4	2.85	
1968	11,912,000	240,906	109,547	131,359	20.0	9.1	10.9	6.7	2.89	
1969	12,145,000	250,175	106,496	143,681	20.4	8.7	11.7	7.7	2.93	
1970	12,407,000	257,516	113,048	144,468	20.5	9.0	10.5	9.9	2.94	
1971	12,663,000	276,361	110,650	165,711	21.5	8.6	12.9	7.5	2.98	
1972	13,067,000	271,960	110,191	161,769	20.6	8.4	12.2	19.5	2.74	
1973	13,303,000	255,848	111,336	144,512	19.1	8.3	10.8	7.2	2.49	
1974	13,504,000	243,658	110,179	133,479	17.9	8.1	9.8	5.2	2.32	
1975	13,771,400	239,794	114,501	125,293	17.4	8.3	9.1	10.7	2.15	
1976	13,915,500	231,135	110,610	120,525	16.6	7.9	8.7	1.8	2.06	
1977	14,074,100	226,954	111,490	115,464	16.1	7.9	8.2	3.2	2.01	
1978	14,248,600	226,359	108,059	118,300	15.9	7.6	8.3	4.1	1.95	
1979	14,521,700	223,370	108,315	115,055	15.5	7.5	8.0	11.2	1.91	
1980	14,695,400	223,664	106,654	117,010	15.3	7.3	8.0	4.0	1.89	
1981	14,923,300	230,920	109,429	121,491	15.6	7.4	8.2	7.4	1.94	
1982	15,178,400	237,076	110,990	116,086	15.7	7.4	8.3	9.4	1.93	128,100
1983	15,393,500	241,764	112,918	128,846	15.8	7.4	8.4	5.8	1.92	73,300
1984	15,579,400	240,544	110,887	129,657	15.5	7.2	8.3	3.8	1.84	49,100
1985	15,788,300	241,814	114,197	127,617	15.4	7.3	8.1	5.3	1.92	73,800
1986	16,018,400	239,115	116,069	123,046	15.0	7.3	7.7	6.9	1.87	100,500
1987	16,263,900	242,977	116,139	126,838	15.0	7.2	7.8	7.5	1.85	125,800
1988	16,532,200	246,200	120,463	125,737	15.0	7.3	7.7	8.9	1.83	149,400
1989	16,814,400	250,155	118,767	131,388	15.1	7.1	8.0	9.3	1.84	157,500
1990	17,065,100	257,521	125,112	132,409	15.3	7.4	7.9	7.2	1.90	124,700
1991	17,284,000	261,158	119,572	141,586	15.2	7.0	8.2	4.6	1.85	86,500
1992	17,494,700	259,200	120,836	138,800	14.9	6.9	8.0	4.3	1.89	68,600
1993	17,667,100	259,959	121,338	138,621	14.8	6.9	7.9	2.9	1.86	30,100
1994	17,854,700	258,314	123,496	134,818	14.5	7.0	7.5	3.1	1.84	46,600
1995	18,071,800	258,210	126,232	131,978	14.4	7.0	7.4	4.9	1.82	80,200
1996	18,310,700	250,438	126,400	124,038	13.8	6.9	6.9	6.4	1.80	104,000
1997	18,517,600	253,660	127,298	126,362	13.7	6.9	6.8	4.5	1.78	87,200
1998	18,711,300	249,105	129,255	119,850	13.4	6.9	6.5	4.1	1.75	79,100
1999	18,925,900	249,965	128,278	121,487	13.3	6.8	6.5	5.0	1.75	96,500
2000	19,153,400	249,310	128,392	120,918	13.1	6.7	6.4	5.7	1.75	107,200
2001	19,413,200	247,500	128,913	118,587	12.8	6.7	6.1	7.5	1.73	135,700
2002	19,654,900	247,400	130,300	117,200	12.9	6.9	6.0	6.5	1.77	110,600
2003	19,902,700	247,400	132,239	115,200	12.5	6.7	5.8	6.8	1.75	116,500
2004	20,139,800	252,100	133,231	115,851	12.4	6.7	5.7	6.2	1.76	100,000
2005	20,409,100	255,800	131,354	124,580	12.6	6.5	6.1	7.3	1.79	123,800
2006	20,697,900	263,500	134,000	129,500	12.8	6.5	6.3	7.9	1.82	146,700
2007	21,015,900	277,700	136,000	141,700	13.2	6.4	6.8	8.6	1.87	232,700
2008	21,384,400	289,500	140,800	148,700	14.4	6.8	7.6	10.6	2.02	277,400
2009	21,778,800	297,100	143,700	153,400	13.9	6.6	7.3	11.4	1.97	299,800
2010	22,031,900	304,200	141,500	162,600	13.4	6.4	7.0	4.2	1.95	172,038
2011	22,340,000	301,200	145,400	155,800	13.5	6.6	6.9	7.0	1.92	205,679
2012	22,733,500	306,000	147,200	158,800	13.6	6.5	7.1	10.6	1.93	241,151
2013	23,128,100	311,100	149,200	161,900	13.3	6.4	6.9	10.4	1.88	235,797
2014	23,475,700	307,000	150,000	157,000	12.8	6.5	6.3	8.3	1.80	179,000
2015	23,816,000	307,700	155,900	151,800	12.8	6.7	6.1	8.1	1.80	181,000
2016	24,385,600	311,800	157,400	154,400	12.9	6.5	6.4	10.2	1.79	243,800
2017	24,770,700	308,500	160,300	148,200	12.7	6.6	6.1	9.7	1.74	241,700
2018	25,180,200	314,900	158,500	156,400	12.7	6.4	6.3	10.2	1.75	248,400
2019	25,522,169	305,800	166,700	139,100	12.1	6.6	5.5	8.1	1.67	210,700
2020	25,694,400	294,400	161,400	133,000	11.5	6.3	5.2	1.5	1.59	3,300
2021	25,422,788(C)	309,996	171,469	138,527	12.1	6.7	5.4	−2.6	1.70	−3,600
2022	26,268,359	300,684	190,745	109,800	11.6	7.3	4.3	15.2	1.63	387,000
2023	26,966,789	286,998	183,131	103,867	10.8	6.9	3.9	21.1	1.50	547,300
2024	27,400,013	292,418	187,268	105,150	10.7	6.9	3.8	12.1	1.48	340,800
2025	27,801,023	299,903	188,421	111,482	10.9	6.8	4.1	11.0	1.497	301,000

=== Current vital statistics ===
Period	Live births	Deaths	Natural increase
January—March 2025	72,400	42,800	+29,600
January—March 2026	75,200	45,300	+29,900
Difference	▲ +2,800 (+3.9%)	▲ +2,500 (+5.8%)	▲ +300

=== Total fertility rates by state or territory ===
2024
State/territory	TFR
Northern Territory	1.63
Victoria	1.52
Queensland	1.51
Tasmania	1.49
Australia	1.48
New South Wales	1.46
South Australia	1.46
Western Australia	1.43
Australian Capital Territory	1.27

=== Births by country of birth of the mother ===
Country of birth mother	Numbers
Total	286,998
Total overseas-born	100,011
Oceania and Antarctica	196,654
Australia (includes External Territories)	186,811
New Zealand	7,420
Papua New Guinea	288
Fiji	736
Samoa	701
Other	698
North-West Europe	10,486
United Kingdom	6,986
Ireland	1,153
Austria	55
France	563
Germany	835
Netherlands	295
Switzerland	102
Denmark	64
Other	433
Southern and Eastern Europe	3,846
Italy	478
Malta	30
Portugal	84
Spain	179
Bosnia and Herzegovina	341
Croatia	215
Cyprus	35
North Macedonia	234
Greece	183
Romania	149
Serbia	210
Czechia	95
Hungary	76
Poland	301
Russian Federation	495
Ukraine	248
Other	493
North Africa and the Middle East	7,555
Egypt	423
Iran	1,134
Iraq	1,785
Israel	105
Lebanon	1,078
Syria	490
Turkey	299
Other	2,241
South-East Asia	14,979
Myanmar	802
Cambodia	495
Laos	79
Thailand	1,368
Vietnam	3,064
Indonesia	1,361
Malaysia	1,902
Philippines	5,158
Singapore	632
Other	118
North-East Asia	10,919
China	6,791
Hong Kong	1,066
Taiwan	763
Japan	838
South Korea	1,185
Other	276
Southern and Central Asia	29,771
Bangladesh	1,363
India	16,593
Nepal	4,159
Pakistan	3,276
Sri Lanka	1,876
Afghanistan	2,014
Other	490
Americas	5,459
Canada	901
United States	1,536
Argentina	199
Brazil	1,194
Chile	285
Uruguay	22
Central America	239
Caribbean	57
Other	1,026
Sub-Saharan Africa	7,153
Kenya	489
Mauritius	293
South Africa	2,451
Zimbabwe	642
Other	3,278

=== Life expectancy ===
Life expectancy in Australia since 1885

At the time of Australian Federation in 1901, the rate of natural increase was 14.9 persons per 1,000 population. The rate increased to a peak of 17.4 per thousand population in the years 1912, 1913 and 1914. During the Great Depression, the rate declined to a low of 7.1 per thousand population in 1934 and 1935. Immediately after World War II, the rate increased sharply as a result of the start of the post–World War II baby boom and the immigration of many young people who then had children in Australia. A rate plateau of over 13.0 persons per 1,000 population occurred for every year from 1946 to 1962.

There has been a fall in the rate of natural increase since 1962 due to falling fertility. In 1971, the rate of natural increase was 12.7 persons per 1,000 population; a decade later it had fallen to 8.5. In 1996 the rate of natural increase fell below seven for the first time, with the downward trend continuing in the late 1990s. Population projections by the Australian Bureau of Statistics indicate that continued low fertility, combined with the increase in deaths from an ageing population, will result in natural increase falling below zero sometime in the mid-2030s. However, in 2006 the fertility rate rose to 1.81, one of the highest rates in the OECD.

Since 1901, the crude death rate has fallen from about 12.2 deaths per 1,000 population, to 6.4 deaths per 1,000 population in 2006.

1921–1949
1920s		1921	1922	1923	1924	1925	1926	1927	1928	1929
1920s		61.0	62.9	61.7	62.5	63.2	62.9	62.8	62.9	63.1
1930s	1930	1931	1932	1933	1934	1935	1936	1937	1938	1939
1930s	64.9	65.3	65.6	65.4	64.8	65.1	65.2	65.8	65.8	65.8
1940s	1940	1941	1942	1943	1944	1945	1946	1947	1948	1949
1940s	66.2	66.1	65.9	66.4	68.0	68.5	68.0	68.6	68.5	69.1

Source: Our World in Data

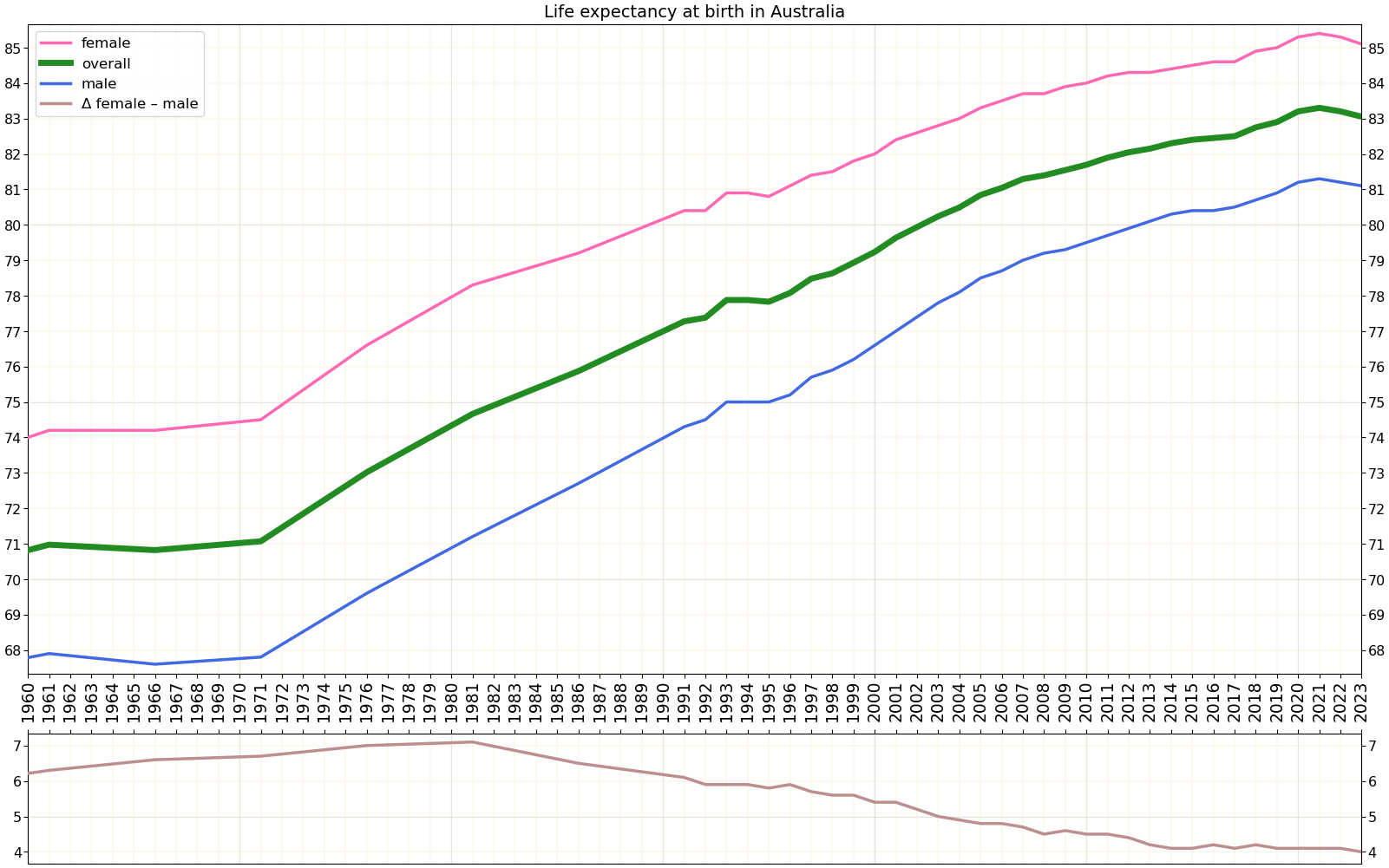
Life expectancy in Australia since 1960 by gender

1950–2015
Period	Life expectancy in years	Period	Life expectancy in years
1950–1955	69.4	1985–1990	76.2
1955–1960	70.4	1990–1995	77.7
1960–1965	70.9	1995–2000	78.8
1965–1970	70.8	2000–2005	80.3
1970–1975	71.8	2005–2010	81.5
1975–1980	73.6	2010–2015	82.3
1980–1985	75.1		

Source: UN World Population Prospects

== Indigenous population ==
Indigenous Australians as a percentage of the population as of the 2011 census

The earliest accepted timeline for the first arrivals of indigenous Australians to the continent of Australia places this human migration to at least 40,000 years ago.

Dutch navigators landed on the coasts of modern Western Australia and Queensland several times during the 17th century. Captain James Cook wrote that he claimed the east coast for Great Britain in 1770 while standing on Possession Island off the west coast of Cape York Peninsula. The west coast was later settled by Britain also. At that time, the indigenous population was estimated to have numbered between as few as 315,000 and as many as 1,100,000, divided into many tribes speaking many different languages. In the 2011 census, 495,757 respondents declared they were Aboriginal, 31,407 declared they were Torres Strait Islander, and a further 21,206 declared they were both Aboriginal and Torres Strait Islanders.

Today, most of Australia's Indigenous population live on the east coast of Australia, where almost 60% of Indigenous Australians live in New South Wales (208,476) and Queensland (188,954) which roughly represents 2–5% of those state's populations. The Northern Territory has an Indigenous population of 61,115, which represents 26.3% of the total Northern Territory population.

There were 24,737 Aboriginal and Torres Strait Islander births registered in 2023, an increase of 349 babies from 2022. This represents 8.6% of all births registered in 2023. The total fertility rate for Aboriginal and Torres Strait Islander women was 2.17 births per woman.

Of the 24,388 Aboriginal and Torres Strait Islander births registered in 2022 only 23% were births for which both parents were identified as being of Aboriginal and Torres Strait Islander origin on the birth certificate. 45% were births where only the mother was of Aboriginal and Torres Strait Islander origin (including births where paternity was not acknowledged or the father's Indigenous status was not stated), and 32% were births where only the father was of Aboriginal and Torres Strait Islander origin (including births where the mother's Indigenous status was not stated).

== Ancestry ==
European Australians from 1947 to 1966, when racial data was collected in the country

The earliest accepted timeline for the first arrivals of humans to the continent of Australia places this human migration to at least 65,000 years ago, most probably from the islands of Indonesia and New Guinea.

Captain James Cook claimed the east coast for Great Britain in 1770; the west coast was later settled by Britain also. At that time, the indigenous population was estimated to have been between 315,000 and 750,000, divided into as many as 500 tribes speaking many different languages.

Between 1788 and the Second World War, the vast majority of settlers and immigrants came from the British Isles (principally England, Ireland and Scotland), although there was significant immigration from China and Germany during the 19th century. In the decades immediately following the Second World War, Australia received a large wave of immigration from across Europe, with many more immigrants arriving from Southern and Eastern Europe than in previous decades. Since the end of the White Australia policy in 1973, Australia has pursued an official policy of multiculturalism, and there has been a large and continuing wave of immigration from across the world, with Asia being the largest source of immigrants in the 21st century.

The Australian Bureau of Statistics no longer collects data on race, but does ask each Australian resident to nominate up to two ancestries each census. These ancestry responses are classified into broad standardised ancestry groups. In the 2021 census, the most commonly nominated individual ancestries as a proportion of the total population were:

- English (33%)
- Australian (29.9%)
- Irish (9.5%)
- Scottish (8.6%)
- Chinese (5.5%)
- Italian (4.4%)
- German (4%)
- Indian (3.1%)
- Aboriginal (2.9%) (Note: Those who nominated their ancestry as "Australian Aboriginal". Does not include Torres Strait Islanders. This relates to nomination of ancestry and is distinct from persons who identify as Indigenous (Aboriginal or Torres Strait Islander) which is a separate question.)
- Greek (1.7%)
- Filipino (1.6%)
- Dutch (1.5%)
- Vietnamese (1.3%)
- Lebanese (1%)
- Polish (0.9%)
- Maltese (0.8%)
- Maori (0.6%)
- Croatian (0.6%)
- South African (0.4%)
- Macedonian (0.3%)

At the 2021 census, 3.2% of the Australian population identified as being Indigenous — Aboriginal Australians and Torres Strait Islanders. (Note: Indigenous identification is separate to the ancestry question on the Australian Census and persons identifying as Aboriginal or Torres Strait Islander may identify any ancestry.) In 2020, 7.5% of births were Aboriginal and Torres Strait Islander persons up from 5.7% in 2010; Aboriginal and Torres Strait Islander fertility rates have stayed above replacement levels even as the nation's has declined rapidly.

Although the ABS does not collect data on race and ethnic background, various studies have put together results of the census to determine the ethnic composition of Australia, the Australian Human Rights Commission has estimated the European population at 76% of the Australian population in 2016, while a media diversity study put it at 72% in 2021, the non-European proportion was 21% and 23% respectively, and the Aboriginal Australian population at 3% in both.

Immigration minister Andrew Giles had pledged to incorporate a question on ethnicity into the 2026 Australian census. However in 2024 the ABS decided against collecting data on ethnicity in favor of ancestry. As recent studies indicate that the public does not have a consistent understanding of ethnic identity, or the difference between ethnic identity and ancestry. The ABS determined that due to these complexities, collecting both ethnic identity and ancestry on the same form is not feasible for the 2026 Census.

Estimated ethnic origin of the Australian population in selected years
Ethnic origin	1947	1987
Ethnic origin	%	%
Europe	97.2%	92.9%
Britain, Ireland and New Zealand	89.8%	74.5%
Northern Europe	5.6%	7.4%
Eastern Europe	0.4%	3.9%
Southern Europe	7.4%	7.1%
Asia	1.9%	5.4%
Western Asia	1.5%	2.1%
South Asia	0.1%	0.6%
South East Asia	0%	1.2%
East Asia	0.2%	1.4%
Africa	0%	0.1%
Latin America	0.1%	0.3%
Pacific Islanders	0.1%	0.3%
Aboriginal and TSI	0.8%	1%

=== Immigration and country of birth ===
Australian and foreign born population pyramid in 2021

In 2019, 30% of the Australian resident population, or 7,529,570 people, were born overseas.

Australia's population has quadrupled since the end of World War I, much of this increase from immigration. Australia has the world's eighth-largest immigrant population, with immigrants accounting for 30% of the population, a higher proportion than in any other nation with a population of over 10 million. Asia is the largest source of immigrants in the 21st century. Net overseas migration reached a record level of 536,000 in 2022–23. Overall migration was 739,000 in 2022-23. Net permanent and long-term arrivals in 2023 were 447,790, the highest on record. Most immigrants are skilled, but the immigration quota includes categories for family members and refugees.

The following table shows Australia's population by country of birth as estimated by the Australian Bureau of Statistics in 2025. It shows only countries or regions or birth with a population of over 100,000 residing in Australia.

Source: Australian Bureau of Statistics (2025)
Place of birth	Estimated resident population (Note: Only countries with 100,000 or more are listed here.)
Total Australian-born	18,779,950
Total foreign-born	8,833,710
India	971,020
England (Note: The Australian Bureau of Statistics source lists England, Scotland, Wales and Northern Ireland separately although they are all part of the United Kingdom. These should not be combined as they are not combined in the source.)	970,950
China (Note: In accordance with the Australian Bureau of Statistics source, Mainland China, Taiwan and the Special Administrative Regions of Hong Kong and Macau are listed separately.)	731,540
New Zealand	637,680
Philippines	412,530
Vietnam	326,630
South Africa	229,950
Nepal	213,580
Sri Lanka	184,800
Malaysia	184,320
Italy	152,560
Pakistan	143,920
Indonesia	128,140
Hong Kong	128,040
Scotland	125,690
United States	122,030
South Korea	121,660
Thailand	115,250
Iraq	111,880
(Republic of Ireland) Ireland	105,620
Germany	101,400

As of 2020, 29.8% of Australia's population was born overseas and 76% as of 2016 had European ancestry. The percentage of Australians with European backgrounds has been declining since the 1960s and 1970s, which is around the time the White Australia policy was abolished.

=== Quarterly migration data, 2013–present ===
Date	Immigration ('000)	Emigration ('000)	Net migration ('000)
Jun 2013	482.09	−251.76	230.33
Sep 2013	484.31	−263.10	221.21
Dec 2013	478.68	−270.31	208.38
Mar 2014	472.63	−270.44	202.19
Jun 2014	464.68	−276.90	187.78
Sep 2014	459.84	−276.11	183.74
Dec 2014	458.76	−276.41	182.35
Mar 2015	460.64	−279.56	181.08
Jun 2015	465.25	−281.22	184.03
Sep 2015	469.39	−285.16	184.23
Dec 2015	473.25	−286.52	186.73
Mar 2016	481.33	−285.35	195.98
Jun 2016	489.28	−283.04	206.23
Sep 2016	507.11	−277.60	229.51
Dec 2016	519.65	−275.82	243.83
Mar 2017	536.66	−277.08	259.59
Jun 2017	540.15	−276.80	263.35
Sep 2017	540.06	−280.64	259.43
Dec 2017	531.37	−289.71	241.66
Mar 2018	527.23	−289.23	238.00
Jun 2018	527.52	−289.30	238.22
Sep 2018	530.94	−288.62	242.32
Dec 2018	534.40	−282.18	252.22
Mar 2019	536.60	−285.93	250.67
Jun 2019	550.40	−309.06	241.34
Sep 2019	566.35	−324.32	242.04
Dec 2019	607.87	−360.25	247.62
Mar 2020	618.36	−379.11	239.25
Jun 2020	506.85	−314.16	192.70
Sep 2020	361.95	−286.34	75.61
Dec 2020	235.35	−240.32	−4.97
Mar 2021	113.00	−207.34	−94.34
Jun 2021	146.00	−230.93	−84.94
Sep 2021	162.49	−218.63	−56.14
Dec 2021	216.11	−209.24	6.87
Mar 2022	336.24	−208.35	127.89
Jun 2022	426.73	−223.14	203.59
Sep 2022	571.41	−229.93	341.48
Dec 2022	646.11	−223.88	422.23
Mar 2023	694.61	−221.53	473.08
Jun 2023	737.17	−219.08	518.09
Dec 2023	740.90	−205.91	534.99
Mar 2024	714.16	−211.19	502.97
Jun 2024	666.81	−221.17	445.64
Sep 2024	615.33	−250.51	364.82
Dec 2024	593.54	−263.61	329.94
Mar 2025	578.71	−267.44	311.27
Jun 2025	568.37	−262.80	305.57

== Language ==
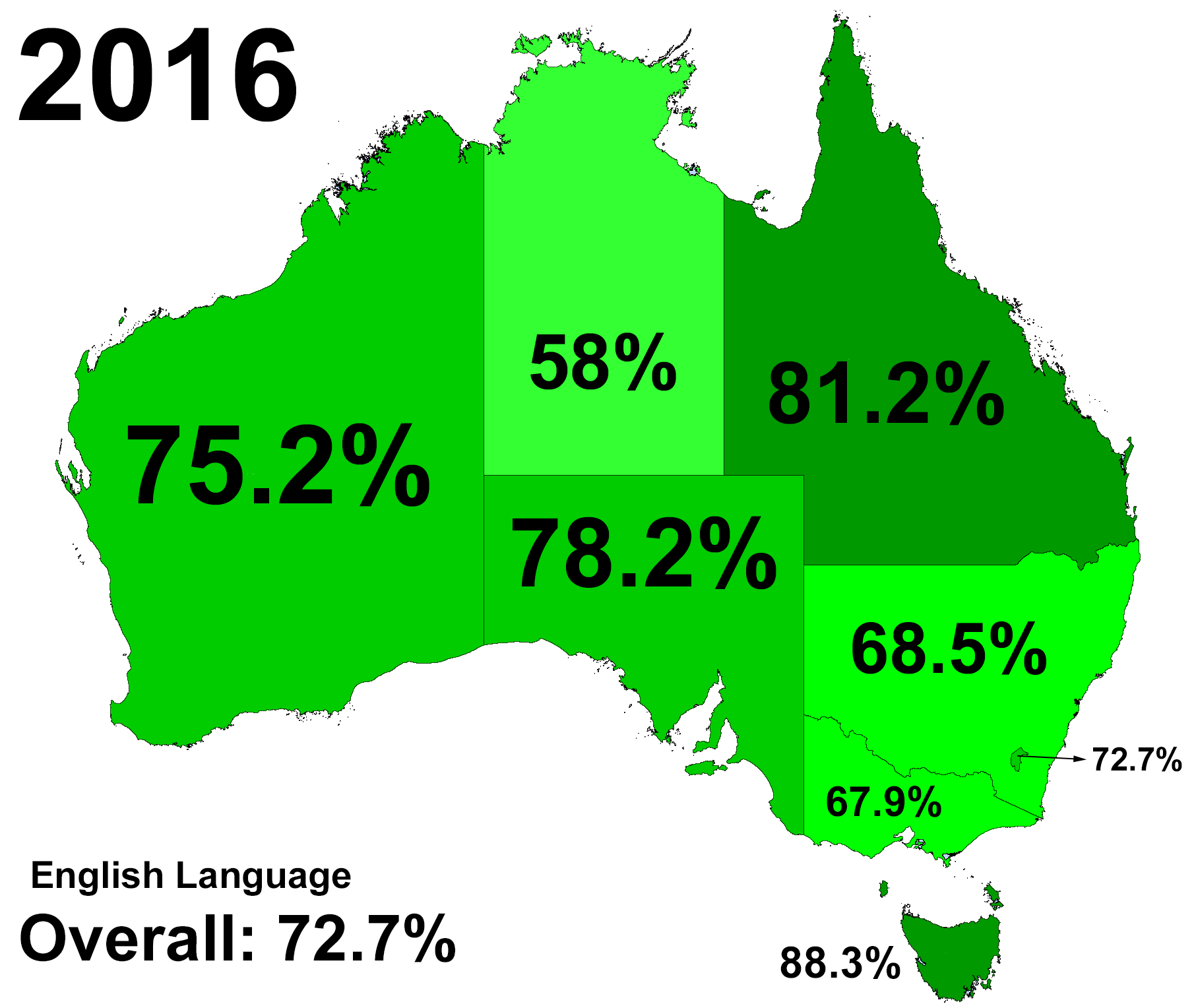
Percentage of people who speak the English language at home in 2016

The vast majority of Australians speak English at home, with the exception of some Aboriginal Australians and first-generation immigrants. Although Australia has no official language, English has always been the de facto national language and the only common tongue. Australian English is a major variety of the language, with a distinctive accent and lexicon, and differs slightly from other varieties of English in grammar and spelling. General Australian serves as the standard variety.

At the 2021 census English was the only language spoken in the homes of 72% of the population. The next most common languages spoken at home are Mandarin Chinese (2.7%), Arabic (1.4%), Vietnamese (1.3%), and Cantonese (1.2%). Considerable proportions of first- and second-generation immigrants are bilingual.

Over 250 Indigenous Australian languages are thought to have existed at the time of first European contact; fewer than 20 are still in daily use by all age groups. About 110 others are spoken exclusively by older people. At the time of the 2006 census, 52,000 Indigenous Australians, representing 12% of the Indigenous population, reported that they spoke an Indigenous language at home.

Australia has its own sign language, Auslan. The Australian Bureau of Statistics included Auslan as an option for the first time in the 2021 census when asking which language was used at home. According to the census, it is the main language of about 16,000 deaf people.

== Religion ==
Religion in Australia as declared in the 2021 census
1. Christianity (43.9%)
2. No religion (38.9%)
3. Islam (3.20%)
4. Hinduism (2.70%)
5. Buddhism (2.40%)
6. Sikhism (0.80%)
7. Other religions (0.90%)
8. Not stated or unclear (7.20%)

At the 2021 Census, 38.9% of the population identified as having "no religion", up from 15.5% in 2001. The largest religion is Christianity (43.9% of the population). The largest Christian denominations are the Roman Catholic Church (20% of the population) and the Anglican Church of Australia (9.8%). Multicultural immigration since the Second World War has led to the growth of non-Christian religions, the largest of which are Islam (3.2%), Hinduism (2.7%), Buddhism (2.4%), Sikhism (0.8%), and Judaism (0.4%).

The Australian Bureau of Statistics 2001 Census Dictionary statement on religious affiliation states the purpose for gathering such information:

Data on religious affiliation are used for such purposes as planning educational facilities, aged persons' care and other social services provided by religion-based organisations; the location of church buildings; the assigning of chaplains to hospitals, prisons, armed services and universities; the allocation of time on public radio and other media; and sociological research.

Historically, Australian Aboriginal religion and mythology was the prevalent belief system in Australia until around 1840, when European Australians first outnumbered indigenous Australians. For a period, in the 19th and 20th centuries, Australia was majority Protestant with a large Catholic minority. Catholics first outnumbered Anglicans in the 1986 census. As a result of this history, while Australia has no official religion and "no religion" constitutes the largest group by religious identification, the various governments of Australia refer to the Christian God in their ceremonies, as do the various Australian Courts. In all censuses since 1991, the percentage of Christians has been steadily decreasing, while the percentage of non-religious has been increasing.

As in many Western countries, the level of active participation in religious services is lower than would be indicated by the proportion of the population identifying themselves as affiliated with a religion; weekly attendance at Christian church services is about 1.3 million, or about 4.6% of the population. Christian charitable organisations, hospitals and schools play a prominent role in welfare and education services. The Catholic education system is the second biggest sector after government schools, with more than 795,000 students (and around 20 per cent of all secondary school enrolments).

Religious affiliation in Australia
Religion	2006		2011		2016		2021	
Religion	('000)	(%)	('000)	(%)	('000)	(%)	('000)	(%)
Christian	12,685	63.9	13,149.3	61.1	12,201.6	52.1	11,148.8	43.9
No religion	3,706.8	18.7	4,804.6	22.3	7,040.7	30.1	9,887.0	38.9
Islam	340.4	1.7	476.3	2.2	604.2	2.6	813.4	3.2
Buddhism	418.8	2.1	529.0	2.5	563.7	2.4	615.8	2.4
Hinduism	—	—	275.5	1.3	440.3	1.9	684.0	2.7
Sikhism	—	—	72.3	0.3	125.9	0.5	210.4	0.8
Other	133.8	0.5	193.2	0.9	186.7	0.8	215.0	0.8
Not stated	224.0	11.2	235.8	1.1	237.8	1.0	237.4	1.0
Total population ('000)	21,507.7	—	21,507.7	—	23,401.9	—	25,422.8	—

== Economics ==
Median weekly total household income by statistical local area in the 2011 census

In trend terms, in April 2025, the Australian labour force consisted of 14,622,100 people, representing a seasonal employment rate of 64.4%; on the same time, unemployment and underemployment rates remained at 4.1% and 6.0% respectively. At the 2021 census, the national median weekly personal income across Australia was $789, and the median weekly household income was $1,770. More than half of people had employee wages and salary as their main source of income (56.4% or more than 10.5 million people). Government benefits and allowances were the main source of income for 23.4% or 4.4 million people.

== See also ==
- Ageing of Australia
- Health care in Australia
- History of public health in Australia
- Homelessness in Australia
- White Australia Policy
- List of cities in Australia
- Demographics of Sydney
- Demographics of Melbourne
- Demographics of Brisbane
- Demographics of Canberra
- European Australians
- Asian Australians
- Aboriginal Australians
- Religion in Australia
