= Demographics of Canberra =

Canberra is Australia's capital and its largest inland city. At the 2021 census, it had 452,670 residents. This amounted to 1.8% of Australia's population.

At the 2021 census, 32.5% of Canberra's population were born overseas, a large majority of which were born in Asia and Europe. The top three overseas countries of birth were India, England and China.

The estimated population for Canberra as of 2021 was 452,670, constituting 223,365 males and 229,301 females. The 2021 unemployment rate was around 3.8%.

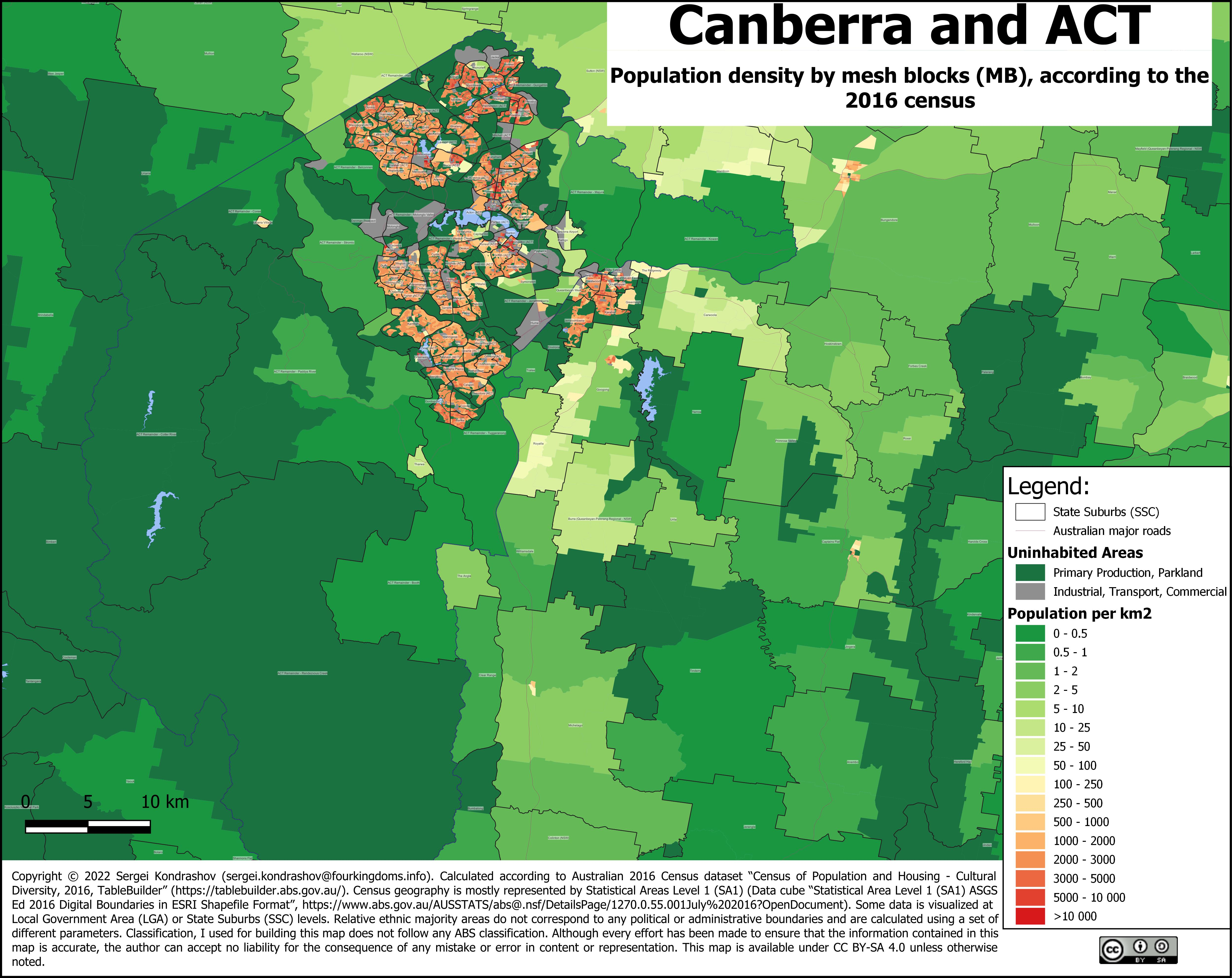
Canberra and ACT population density by mesh blocks (MB), according to the 2016 census

== History ==
The first few decades after the establishment of Canberra growth was relatively slow due to low funds after World War I. The population was nearly 2000 at the time. Until the end of World War II development was completely put on hold due to the Great Depression.

Office development accelerated rapidly in the 1960s in Civic. From 1960–1971, the population tripled from 50,000 inhabitants to 146,000 and climbing to 203,000 in 1976. The Australian economy went into recession in 1975, and a year later the construction industries in Canberra collapsed.

In modern times, growth slowed between 1996 and 2001. But the city now experiences annual growth of over 1 per cent.

Population of the ACT
| Year | Pop. | ±% |
|---|---|---|
| 1911 | 1,777 | — |
| 1921 | 2,583 | +45.4% |
| 1933 | 8,947 | +246.4% |
| 1947 | 16,905 | +88.9% |
| 1954 | 30,315 | +79.3% |
| 1961 | 58,828 | +94.1% |
| 1966 | 96,032 | +63.2% |
| 1971 | 151,169 | +57.4% |
| 1976 | 207,740 | +37.4% |
| 1981 | 227,581 | +9.6% |
| 1986 | 258,910 | +13.8% |
| 1991 | 289,320 | +11.7% |
| 1996 | 308,251 | +6.5% |
| 2001 | 307,053 | −0.4% |
| 2006 | 322,036 | +4.9% |
| 2011 | 357,222 | +10.9% |
| 2016 | 397,397 | +11.2% |
| 2021 | 453,890 | +14.2% |
Source: Censuses

== Populations by district ==
Most of Canberra's growth since 1991 has taken place in Gungahlin.

| Population of Canberra districts | 1991 | 1996 | 2001 | 2006 | 2011 | 2016 | 2021 |
|---|---|---|---|---|---|---|---|
| North Canberra | 40,249 | 38,818 | 38,585 | 43,757 | 48,030 | 53,002 | 61,188 |
| South Canberra | 22,371 | 22,730 | 23,324 | 24,581 | 24,154 | 27,007 | 31,592 |
| Belconnen | 89,519 | 85,659 | 81,701 | 87,246 | 92,444 | 96,049 | 106,061 |
| Woden Valley | 33,921 | 33,043 | 32,494 | 31,992 | 32,958 | 34,760 | 39,279 |
| Weston Creek | 27,268 | 24,879 | 23,662 | 22,886 | 22,746 | 22,988 | 24,630 |
| Tuggeranong | 74,412 | 90,104 | 90,875 | 89,666 | 86,900 | 85,154 | 89,461 |
| Gungahlin | 455 | 12,684 | 24,398 | 32,550 | 47,303 | 71,142 | 87,682 |
| Molonglo | | | | | 27 | 4,578 | 11,435 |
| Total Canberra | 288,195 | 307,917 | 307,053 | 322,036 | 355,596 | 395,790 | 452,670 |

== Ancestry and immigration ==
Country of Birth (2016)
| Birthplace (Note: In accordance with the Australian Bureau of Statistics source, England, Scotland, Mainland China and the Special Administrative Regions of Hong Kong and Macau are listed separately) | Population |
|---|---|
| Australia | 269,682 |
| England | 12,739 |
| Mainland China | 11,334 |
| India | 10,405 |
| New Zealand | 4,722 |
| Philippines | 3,789 |
| Vietnam | 3,340 |
| United States | 2,775 |
| Sri Lanka | 2,774 |
| Malaysia | 2,431 |
| South Korea | 2,283 |

At the 2016 census, the most commonly nominated ancestries were: (Note: As a percentage of 373,561 persons who nominated their ancestry at the 2016 census.)

- English (35%)
- Australian (34%) (Note: The Australian Bureau of Statistics has stated that most who nominate "Australian" as their ancestry are part of the Anglo-Celtic group.)
- Irish (14%)
- Scottish (11%)
- Chinese (6%)
- German (4.7%)
- Indian (3.9%)
- Italian (3.5%)
- Dutch (1.7%)
- Indigenous (1.6%) (Note: Of any ancestry. Includes those identifying as Aboriginal Australians or Torres Strait Islanders. Indigenous identification is separate to the ancestry question on the Australian Census and persons identifying as Aboriginal or Torres Strait Islander may identify any ancestry.)
- Filipino (1.3%)
- Vietnamese (1.3%)
- Greek (1.3%)
- Croatian (1.2%)
- Polish (1.1%)

The 2016 census showed that 32% of Canberra's inhabitants were born overseas. Of inhabitants born outside of Australia, the most prevalent countries of birth were England, China, India, New Zealand and the Philippines.

1.6% of the population, or 6,476 people, identified as Indigenous Australians (Aboriginal Australians and Torres Strait Islanders) in 2016. (Note: Of any ancestry. Includes those identifying as Aboriginal Australians or Torres Strait Islanders. Indigenous identification is separate to the ancestry question on the Australian Census and persons identifying as Aboriginal or Torres Strait Islander may identify any ancestry.)

== Language ==
At the 2016 census, 72.7% of people spoke only English at home. The other languages most commonly spoken at home were Mandarin (3.1%), Vietnamese (1.1%), Cantonese (1%), Hindi (0.9%) and Spanish (0.8%).

== Religion ==
At the 2021 census, the most common responses for religion were no religion (43.5%), Catholic (19.3%), Anglican (8.2%), not stated (5.2%) and Hinduism (4.5%).

== Demographic Statistics ==
=== Median age ===
35 years of age

=== Age structure ===
0–14 years: 18.3% (82,674)
15–64 years: 68.0% (307,992)
65 years and over: 13.8% (62,003)

=== Population growth rate ===
2.1%

=== Birth rate ===
14.16 births/1,000 population

=== Death rate ===
4.88 deaths/1,000 population

=== Life expectancy ===
As of 2021–2023, the Australian Capital Territory has the highest life expectancy in Australia. The life expectancy at birth for males is 81.7 years and 85.7 years for females.

=== Total fertility rate ===
1.31

=== Unemployment rate ===
3.8%
