= Demographics of Brisbane =

Brisbane is the capital of and most populous city in the Australian state of Queensland, and the third most populous city in Australia. The Australian Bureau of Statistics estimates that the population of Greater Brisbane is 2,462,637 as of June 2018, and the South East Queensland region, centred on Brisbane, encompasses a population of more than 3.6 million. The Brisbane central business district stands on the original European settlement and is situated inside a bend of the Brisbane River, about 15 kilometres (9 miles) from its mouth at Moreton Bay. The metropolitan area extends in all directions along the floodplain of the Brisbane River Valley between Moreton Bay and the Great Dividing Range, sprawling across several of Australia's most populous local government areas (LGAs), most centrally the City of Brisbane, which is by far the most populous LGA in the nation. The demonym of Brisbane is Brisbanite.

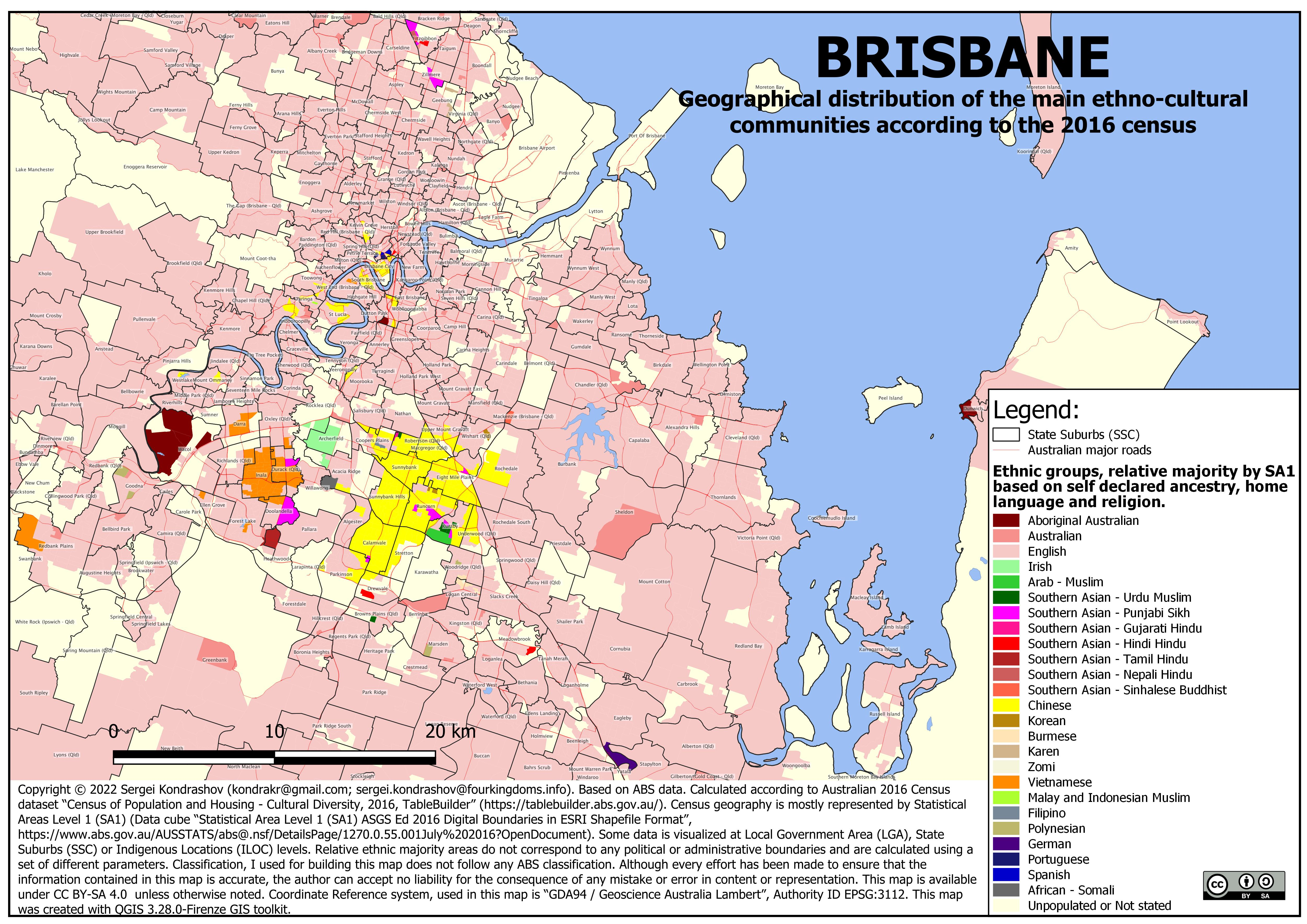
Geographical distribution of the main ethno-cultural communities according to the 2016 census.

== Country of birth ==
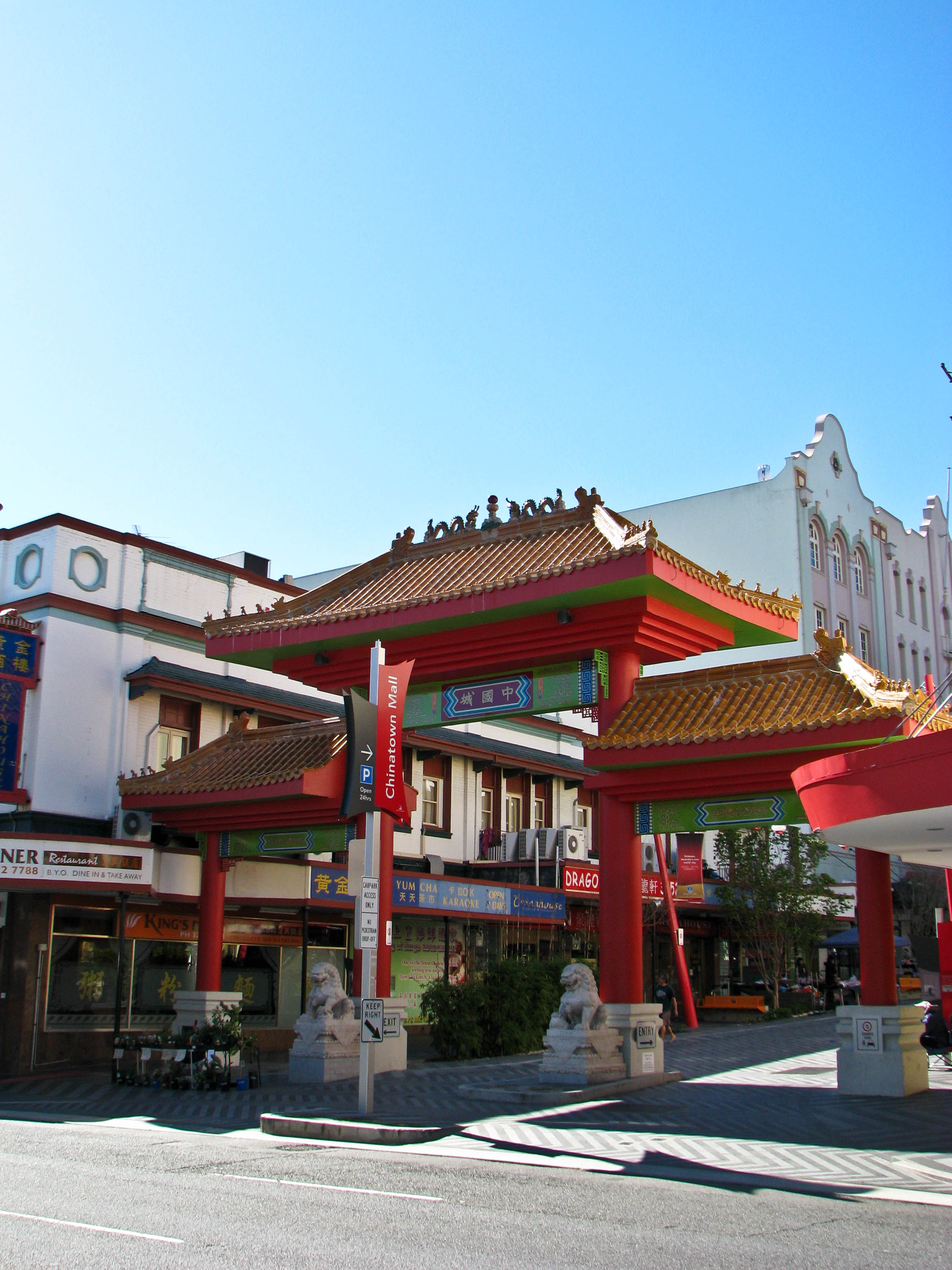
Chinatown, Brisbane

Country of birth (2021)
Birthplace (Note: In accordance with the Australian Bureau of Statistics source, England, Scotland, Mainland China and the Special Administrative Regions of Hong Kong and Macau are listed separately)	Population
Australia	1,726,655
New Zealand	111,649
England	95,284
India	51,650
Mainland China	41,978
Philippines	27,907
South Africa	26,918
Vietnam	20,308
South Korea	13,305
Taiwan	12,826
Scotland	11,956
Malaysia	11,826
Fiji	10,800
United States	10,530
Hong Kong SAR	9,799

The 2021 census showed that 31.7% of Brisbane's inhabitants were born overseas and 52.2% of inhabitants had at least one parent born overseas. Brisbane has the 26th largest immigrant population among world metropolitan areas. Of inhabitants born outside of Australia, the five most prevalent countries of birth were New Zealand, England, India, Mainland China and the Philippines. Brisbane has the largest New Zealand and Taiwanese-born populations of any city in Australia.

== Languages ==
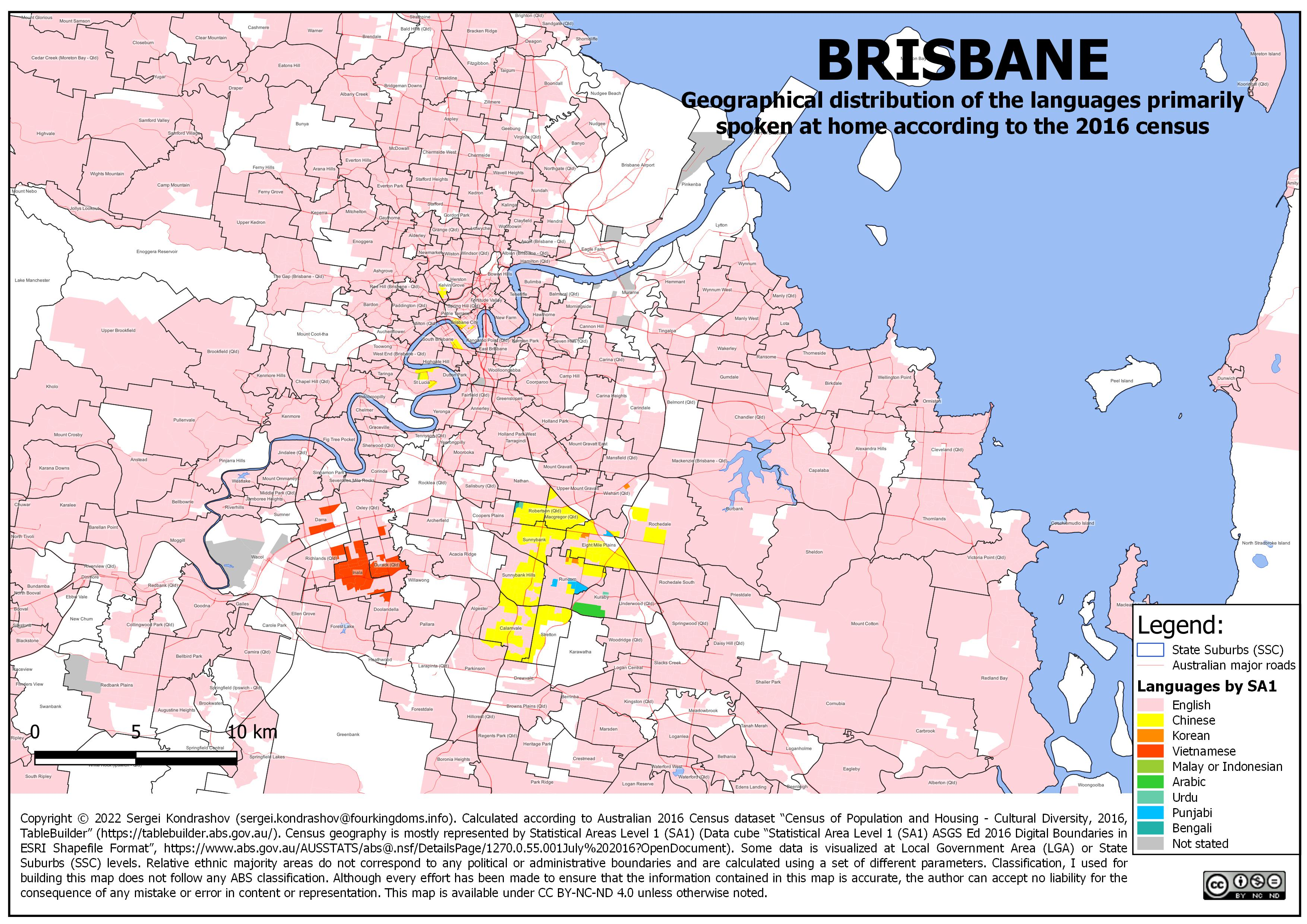
Geographical distribution of the languages primarily spoken at home according to the 2016 census

At the 2021 census, 77.3% of inhabitants spoke only English at home, with the next most common languages being Mandarin (2.5%), Vietnamese (1.1%), Punjabi (0.9%), Cantonese (0.9%) and Spanish (0.8%).

== Ancestry ==
At the 2021 census, the most commonly nominated ancestries were:

- English (36.5%)
- Australian (31.6%) (Note: The Australian Bureau of Statistics has stated that most who nominate "Australian" as their ancestry are part of the Anglo-Celtic group.)
- Irish (11.1%)
- Scottish (10.1%)
- German (5.7%)
- Chinese (4.7%)
- Aboriginal (2.8%) (Note: Those who nominated their ancestry as "Australian Aboriginal". Does not include Torres Strait Islanders. This relates to nomination of ancestry and is distinct from persons who identify as Indigenous (Aboriginal or Torres Strait Islander) which is a separate question.)
- Italian (2.7%)
- Indian (2.7%)
- Dutch (1.6%)
- Filipino (1.6%)
- Maori (1.5%)
- New Zealander (1.4%)
- Samoan (1.2%)
- Vietnamese (1.1%)

At the 2021 census, 3.0% of Brisbane's population identified as being Indigenous — Aboriginal Australians and Torres Strait Islanders. (Note: Indigenous identification is separate to the ancestry question on the Australian Census and persons identifying as Aboriginal or Torres Strait Islander may identify any ancestry.)

== Religion ==
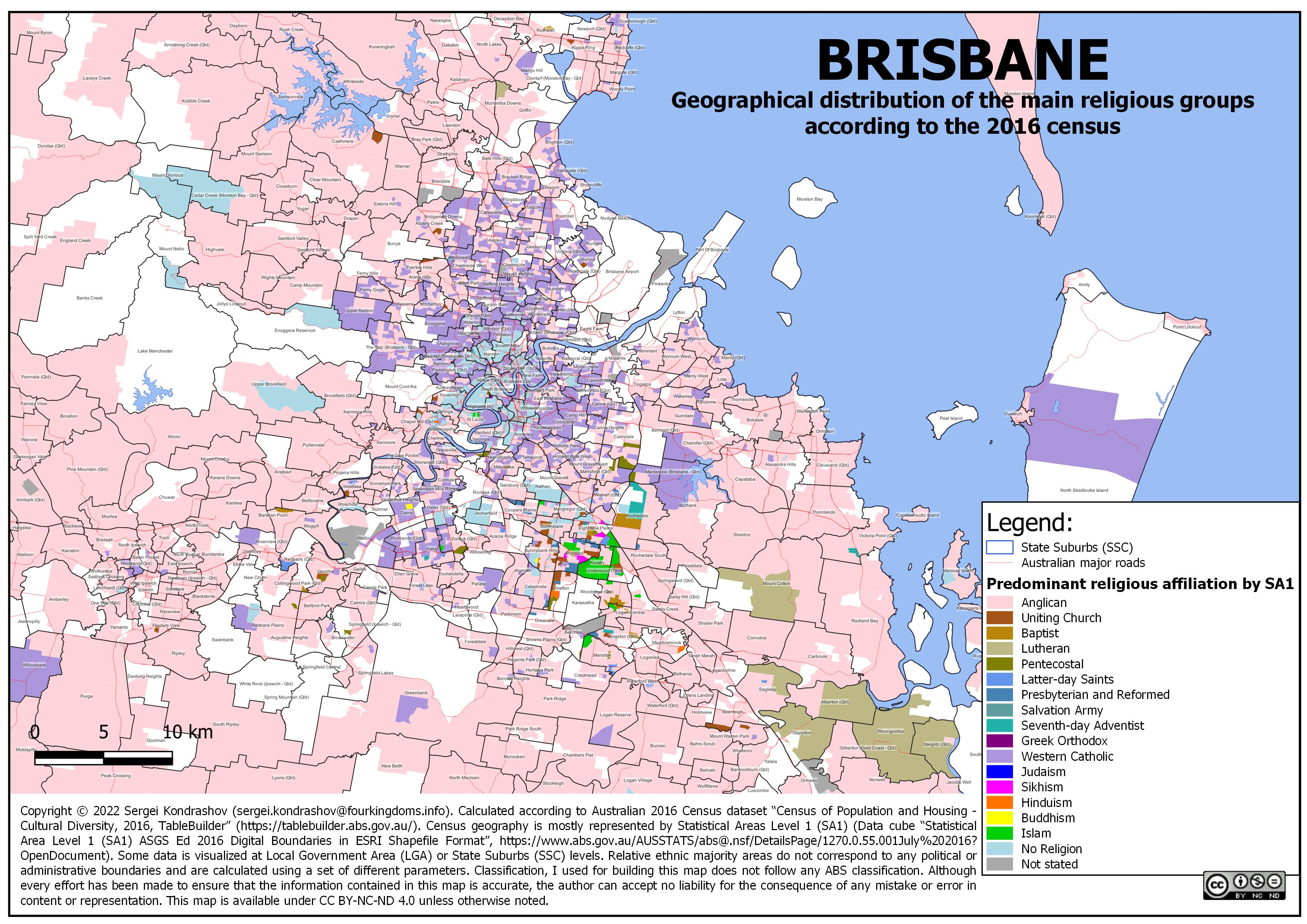
Geographical distribution of the main religious groups, according to the 2016 census.

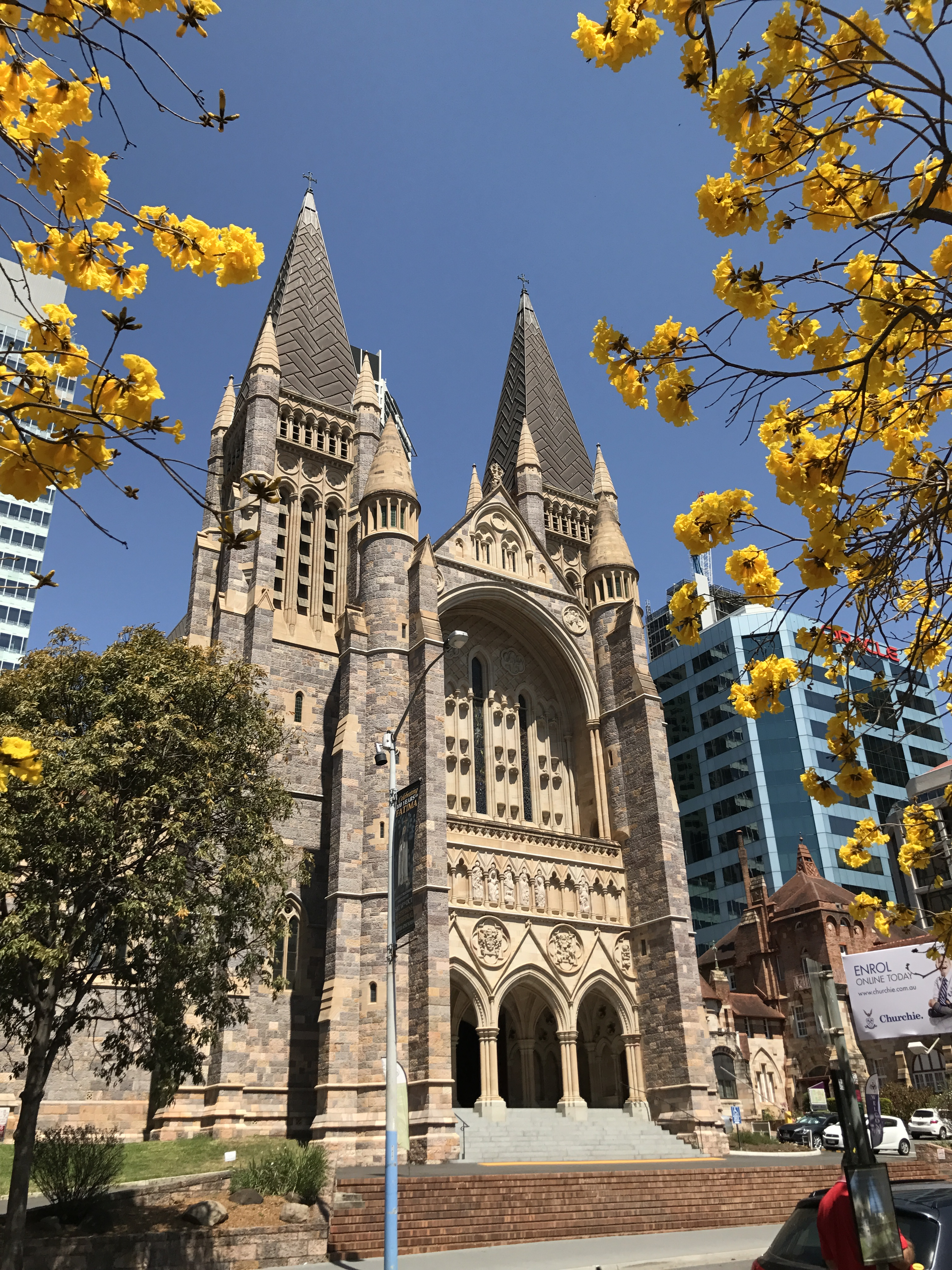
St John's Cathedral. Christianity is Brisbane's largest religion.

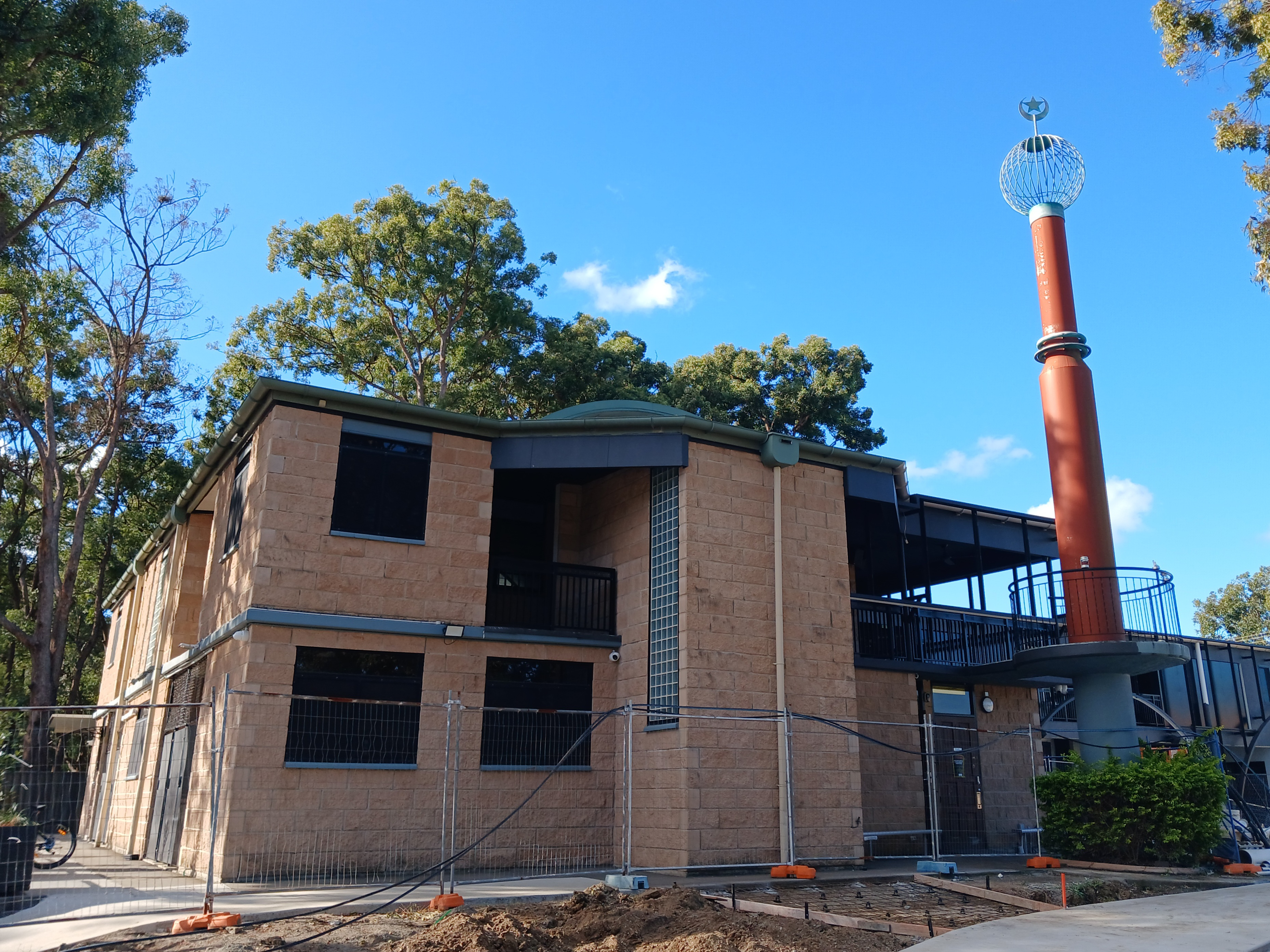
Kuraby Mosque, Brisbane

At the 2021 census, the most commonly cited religious affiliation was 'No religion' (41.4%).

Brisbane's most popular religion at the 2021 census was Christianity at 44.3%, the most popular denominations of which were Catholicism (18.6%) and Anglicanism (9.7%). Brisbane's CBD is home to two cathedrals – St John's (Anglican) and St Stephen's (Catholic).

The most popular non-Christian religions at the 2021 census were Hindu (2%), Buddhist (1.9%) and Muslim (1.8%). Brisbane's religious landscape also includes small but significant communities of Judaism (1.0%) and Sikhism (0.9%).

== Historical Populations ==
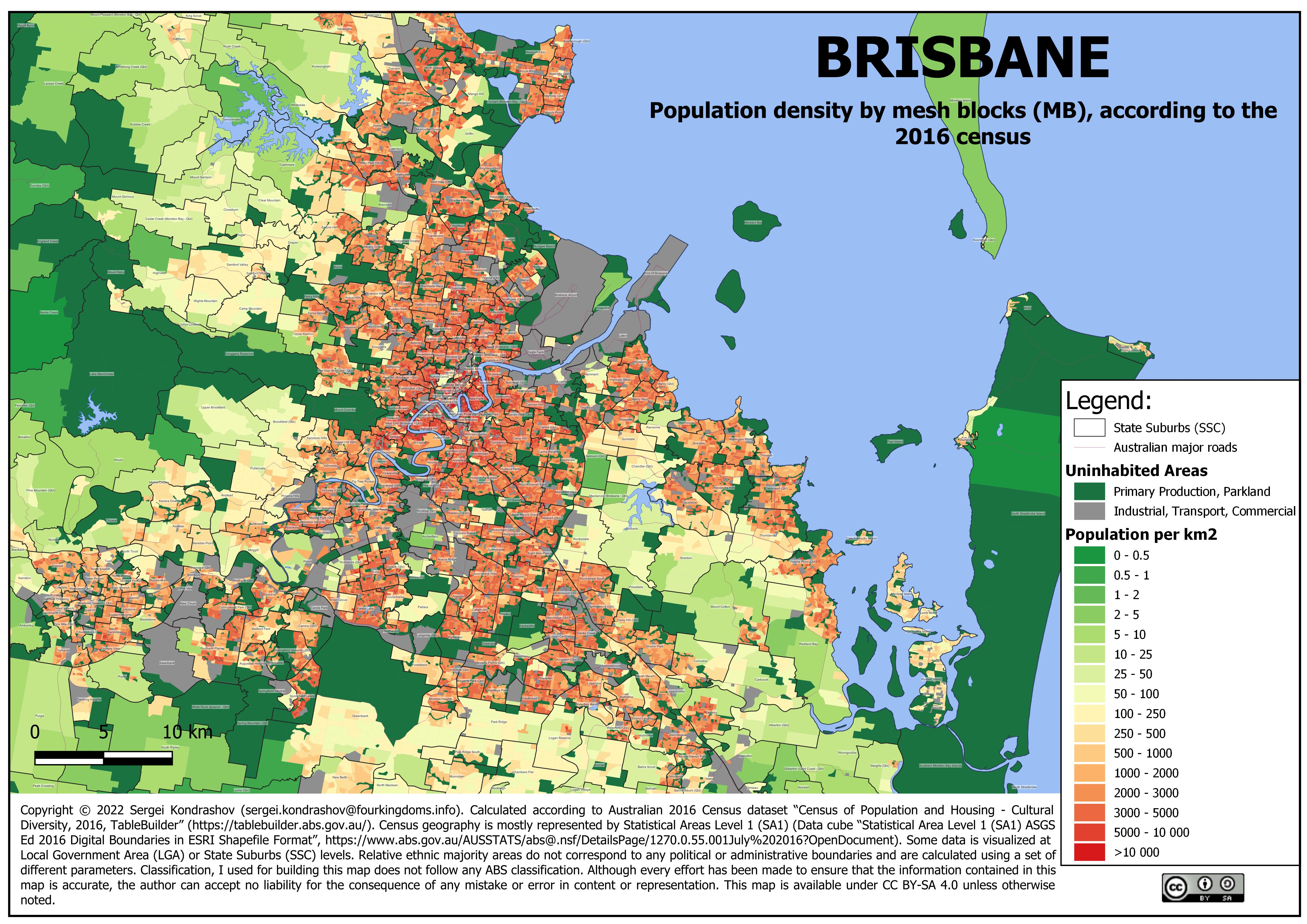
Brisbane population density

Greater Brisbane (Note: Sources: Queensland Treasury (1826-1891), Australian Bureau of Statistics (1901 onwards). Capital cities based on Greater Capital City Statistical Areas (GCCSAs) for 1971 onwards. Populations for previous years are based on earlier boundaries and may be inconsistent with GCCSAs. Pre-1971 may not include the Indigenous population.)
Year	Pop.	±% p.a.
1826	160	—
1831	1,241	+50.64%
1841	120	−20.83%
1851	2,500	+35.48%
1861	6,051	+9.24%
1871	19,413	+12.36%
1881	37,127	+6.70%
1891	88,083	+9.02%
1901	120,650	+3.20%
1911	143,510	+1.75%
1921	217,710	+4.26%
1931	283,440	+2.67%
1941	344,230	+1.96%
1951	453,660	+2.80%
1961	692,924	+4.33%
1971	957,900	+3.29%
1981	1,154,705	+1.89%
1991	1,411,773	+2.03%
2001	1,693,556	+1.84%
2011	2,147,436	+2.40%
2016	2,270,800	+1.12%
2021	2,526,238	+2.15%

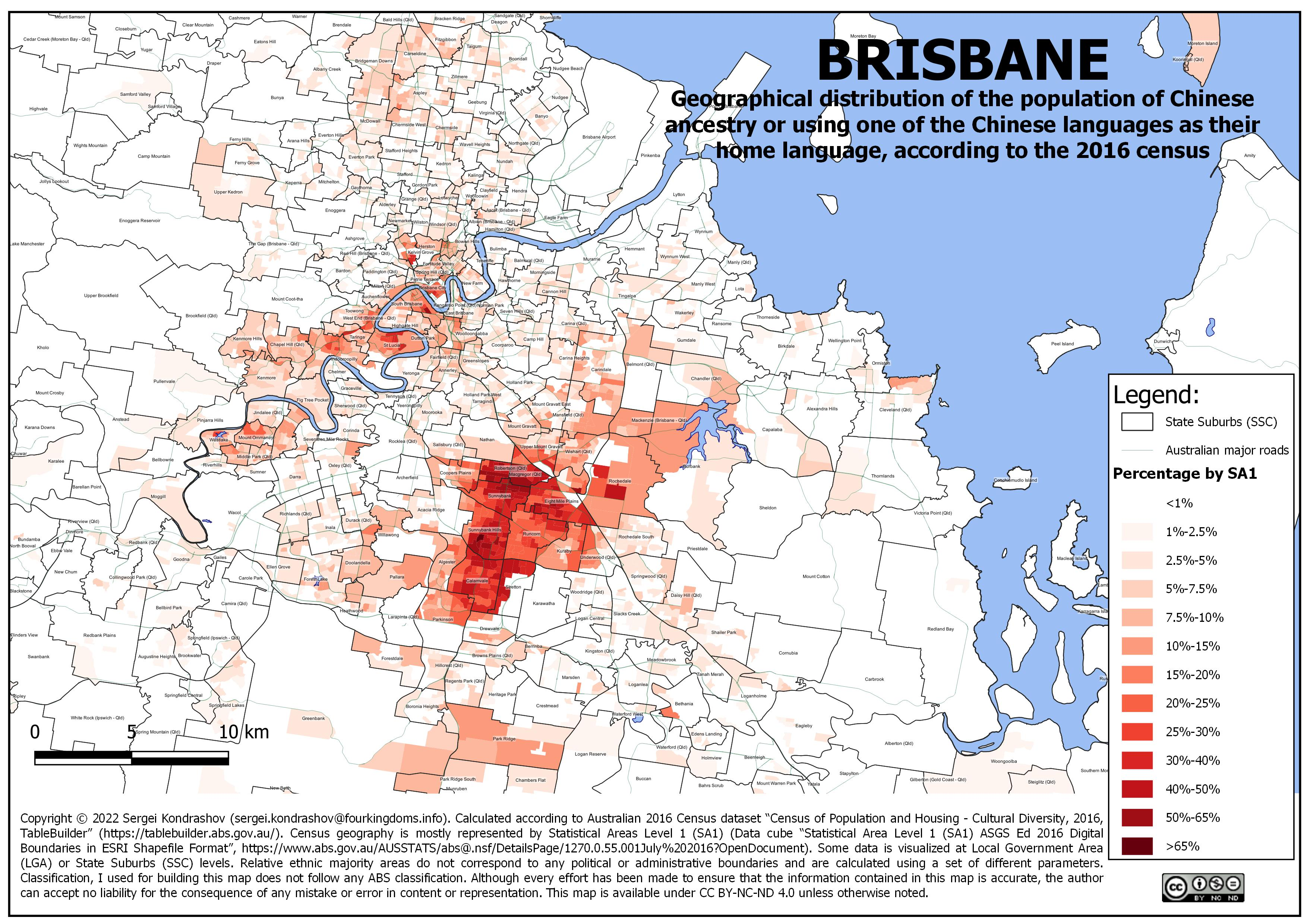
Geographical distribution of Brisbane's population of Chinese origin.

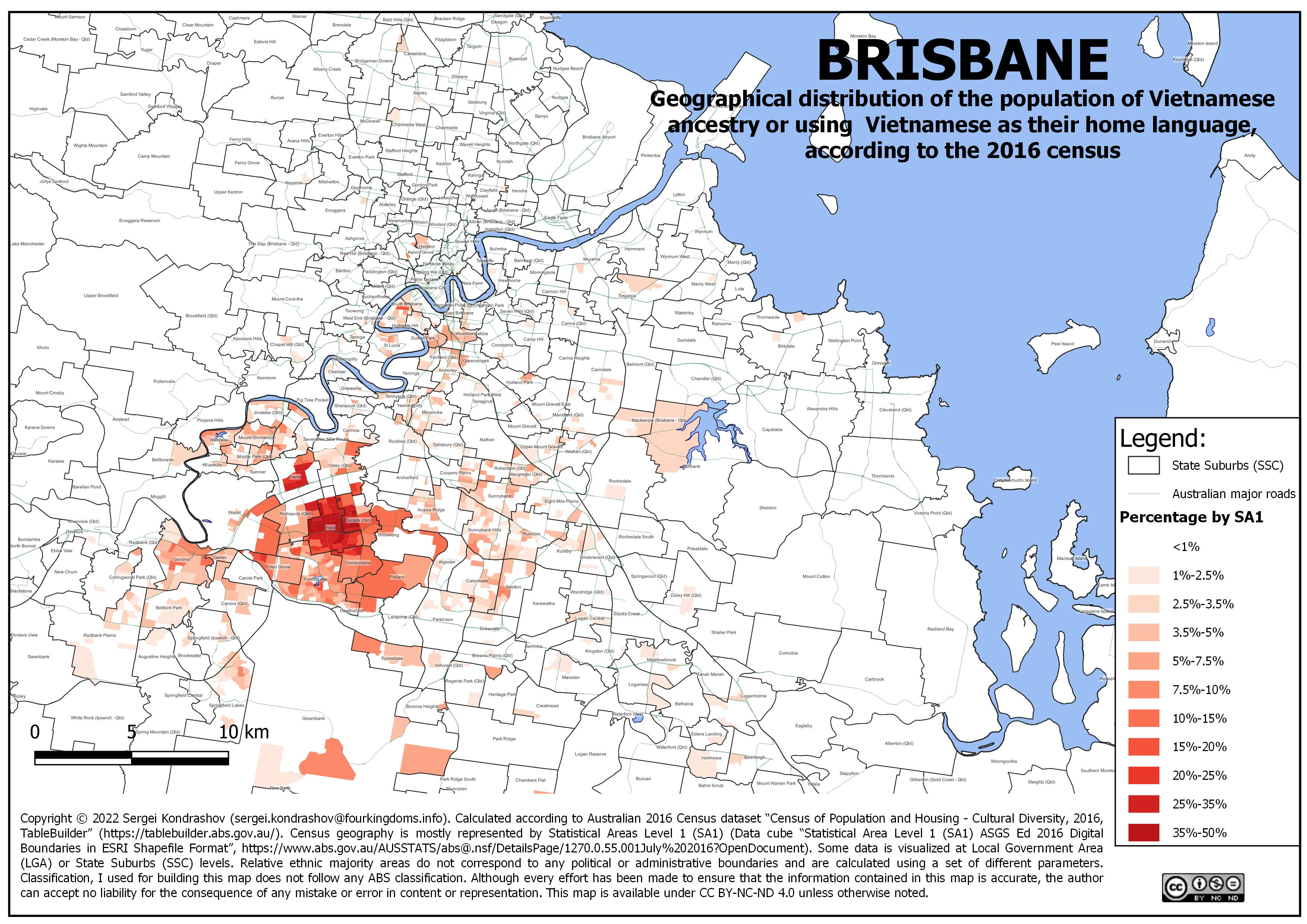
Geographical distribution of Brisbane's population of Vietnamese origin.

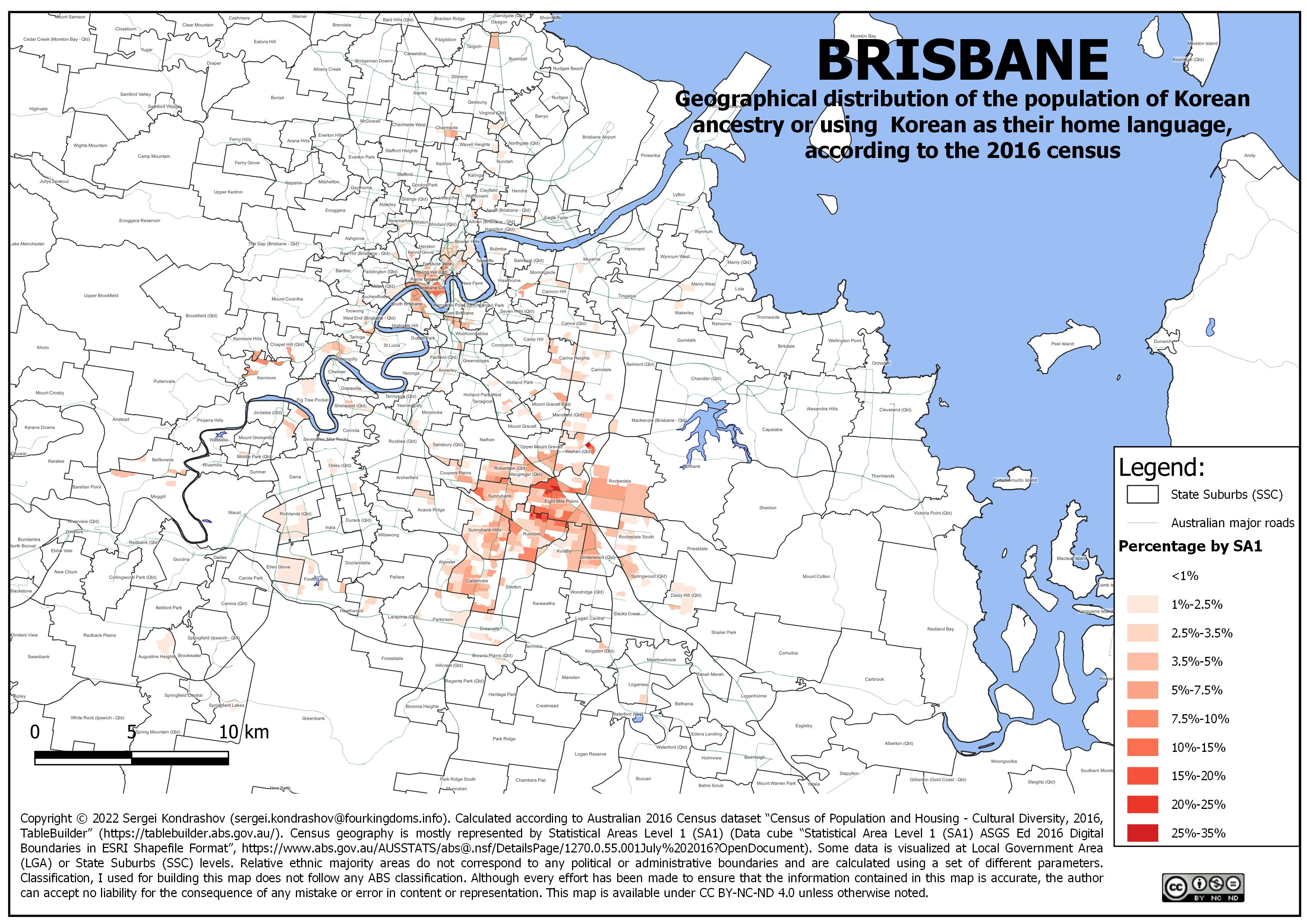
Geographical distribution of Brisbane's population of Korean origin.

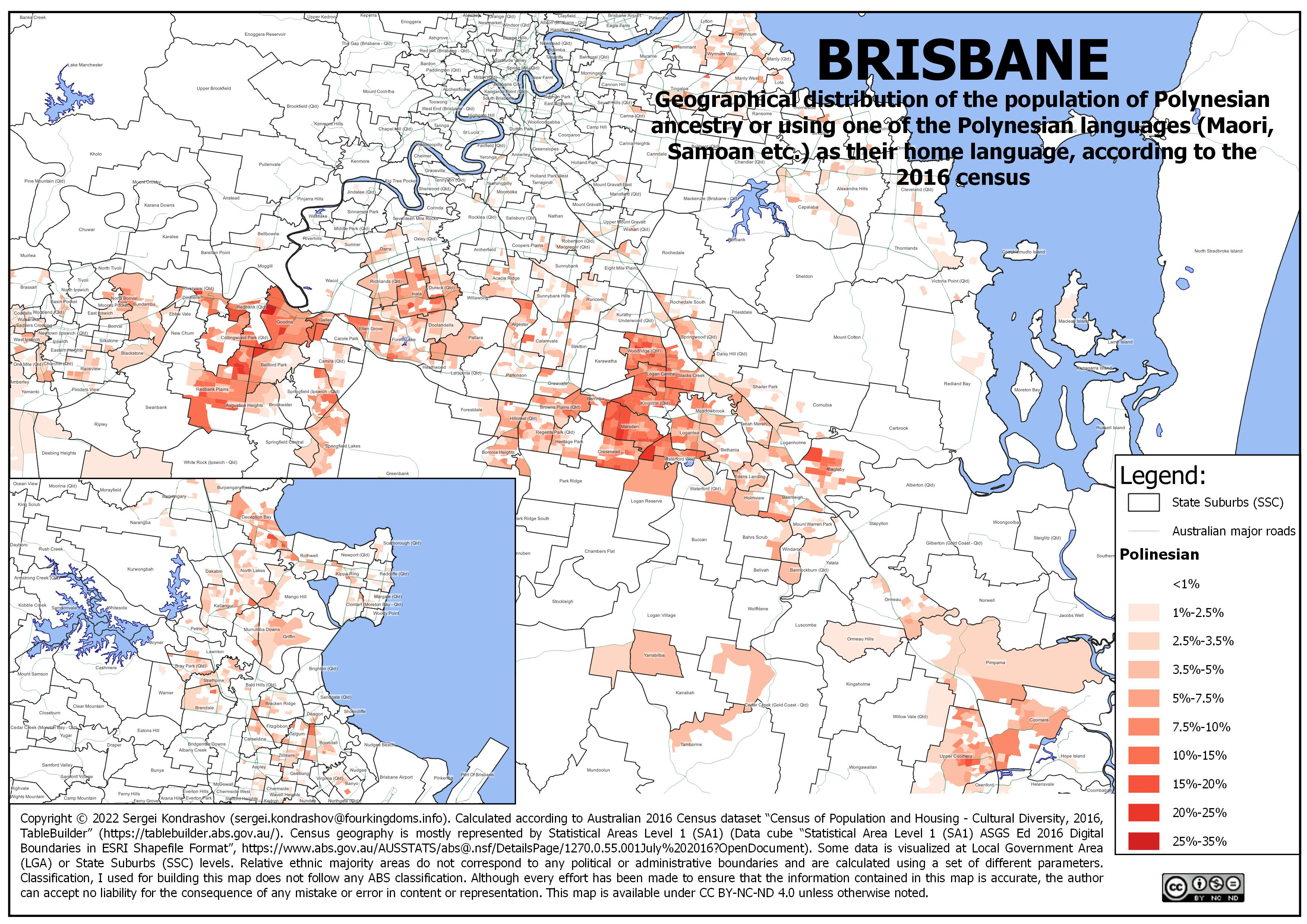
Geographical distribution of Brisbane's population of Polynesian origin.

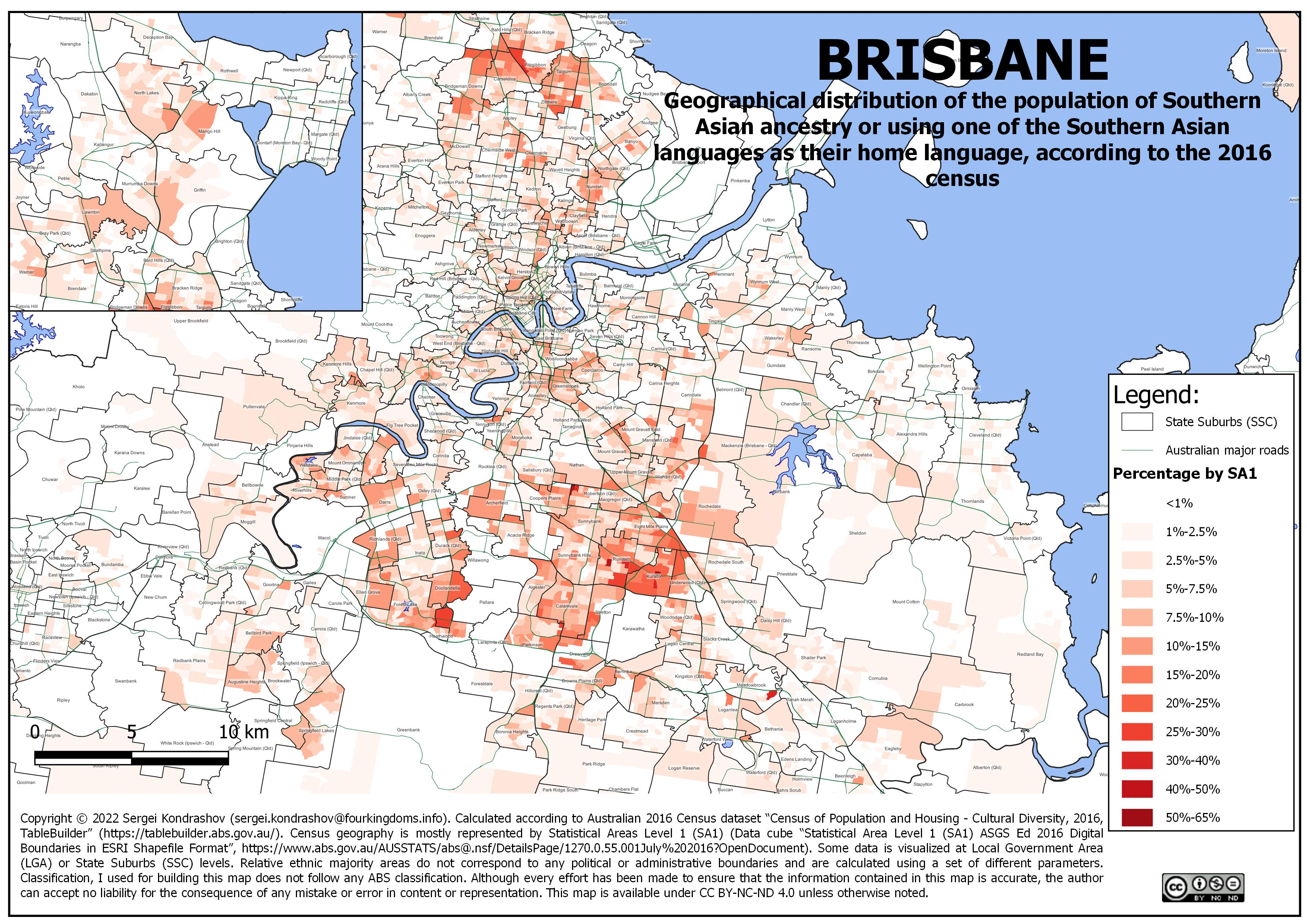
Geographical distribution of Brisbane's population of Southern Asian origin.

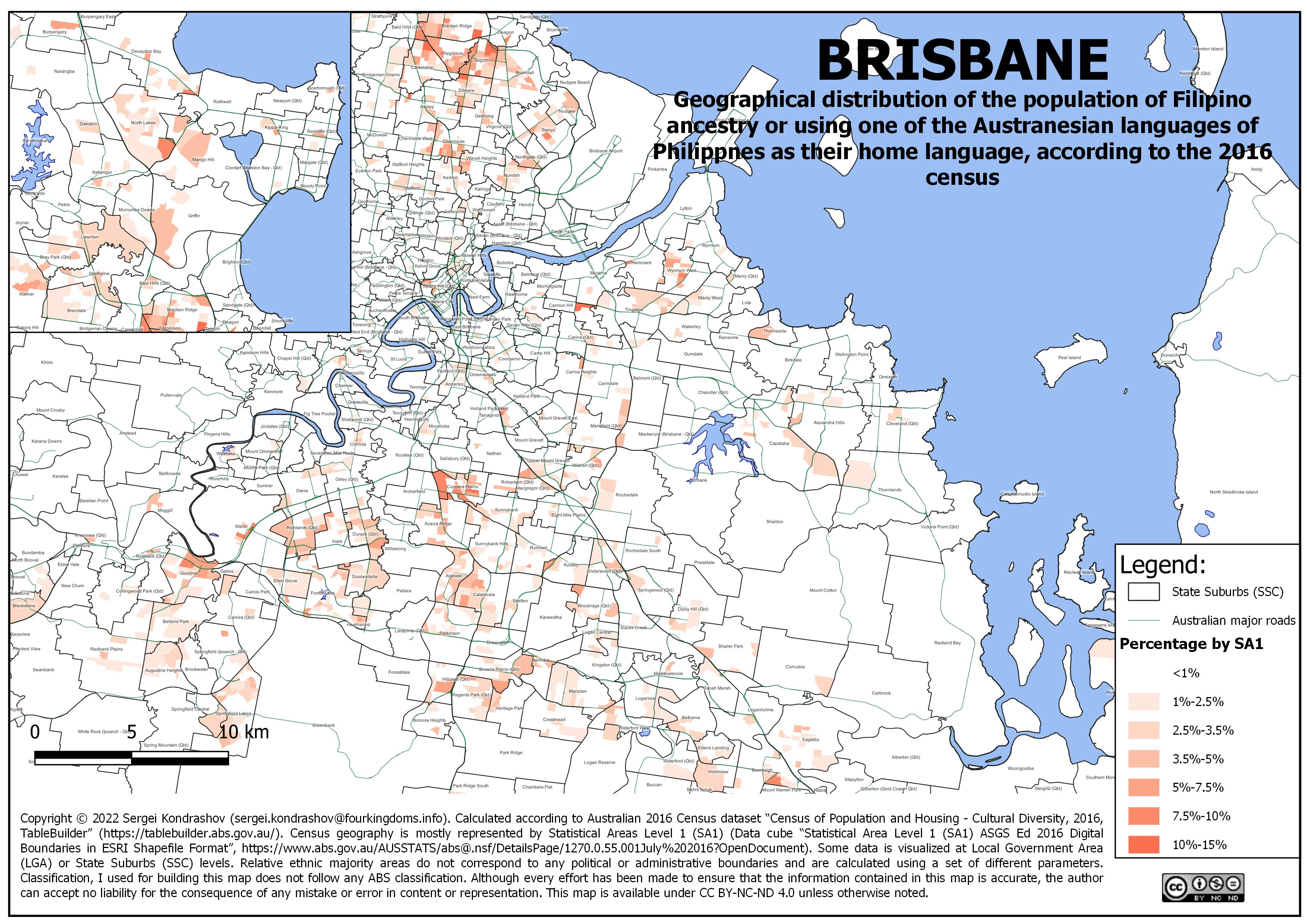
Geographical distribution of Brisbane's population of Filipino origin.

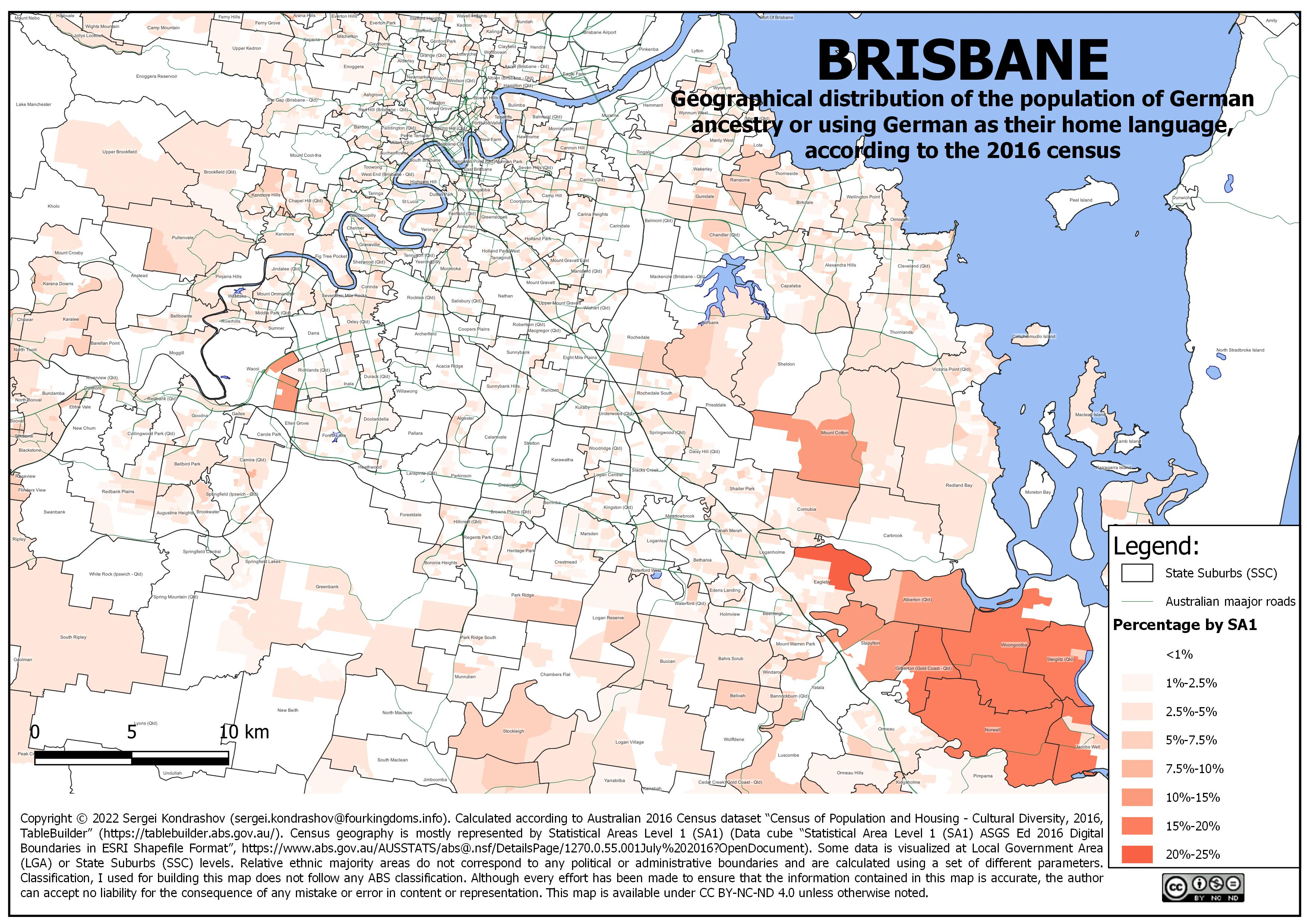
Geographical distribution of Brisbane's population of German origin.

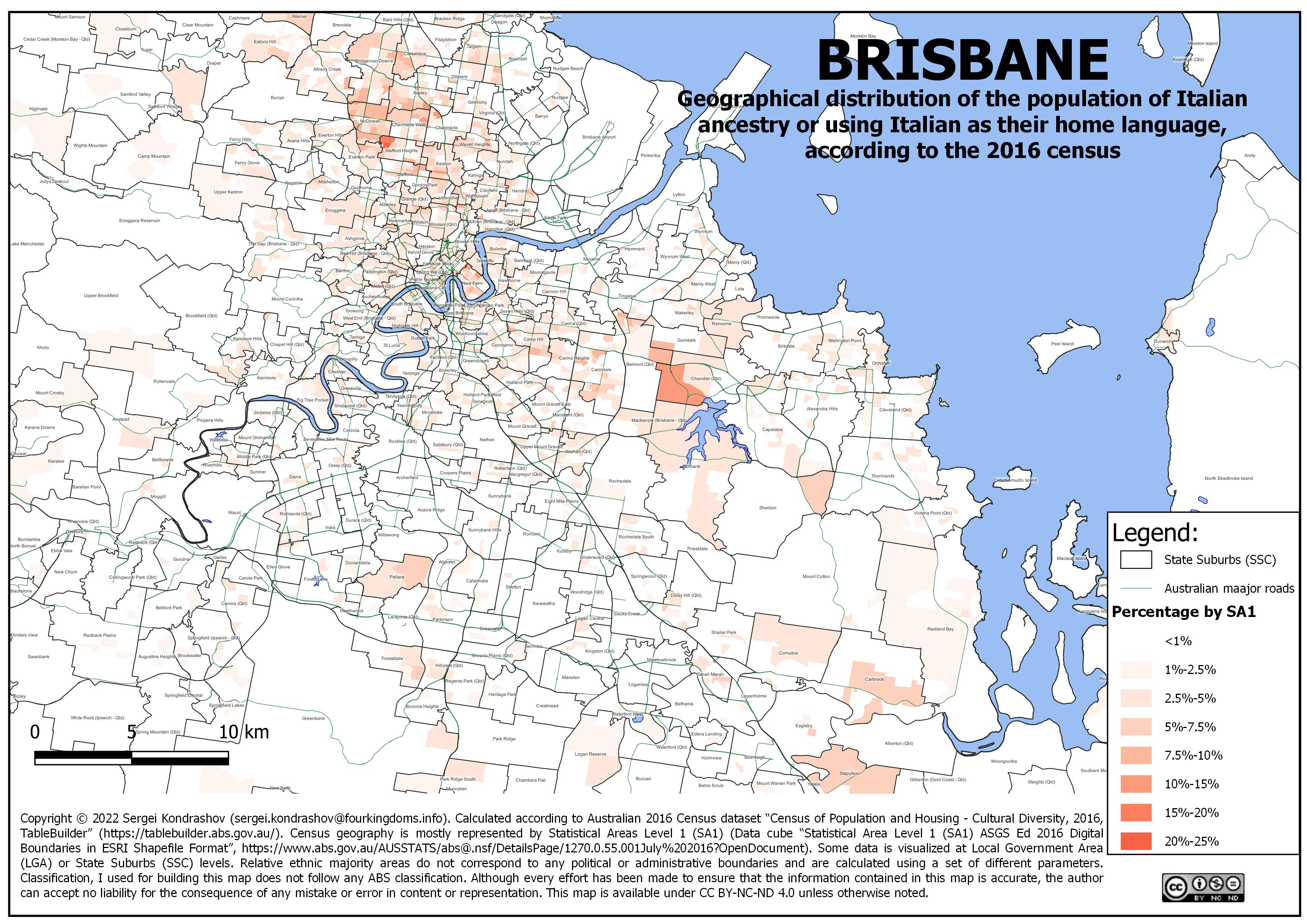
Geographical distribution of Brisbane's population of Italian origin.

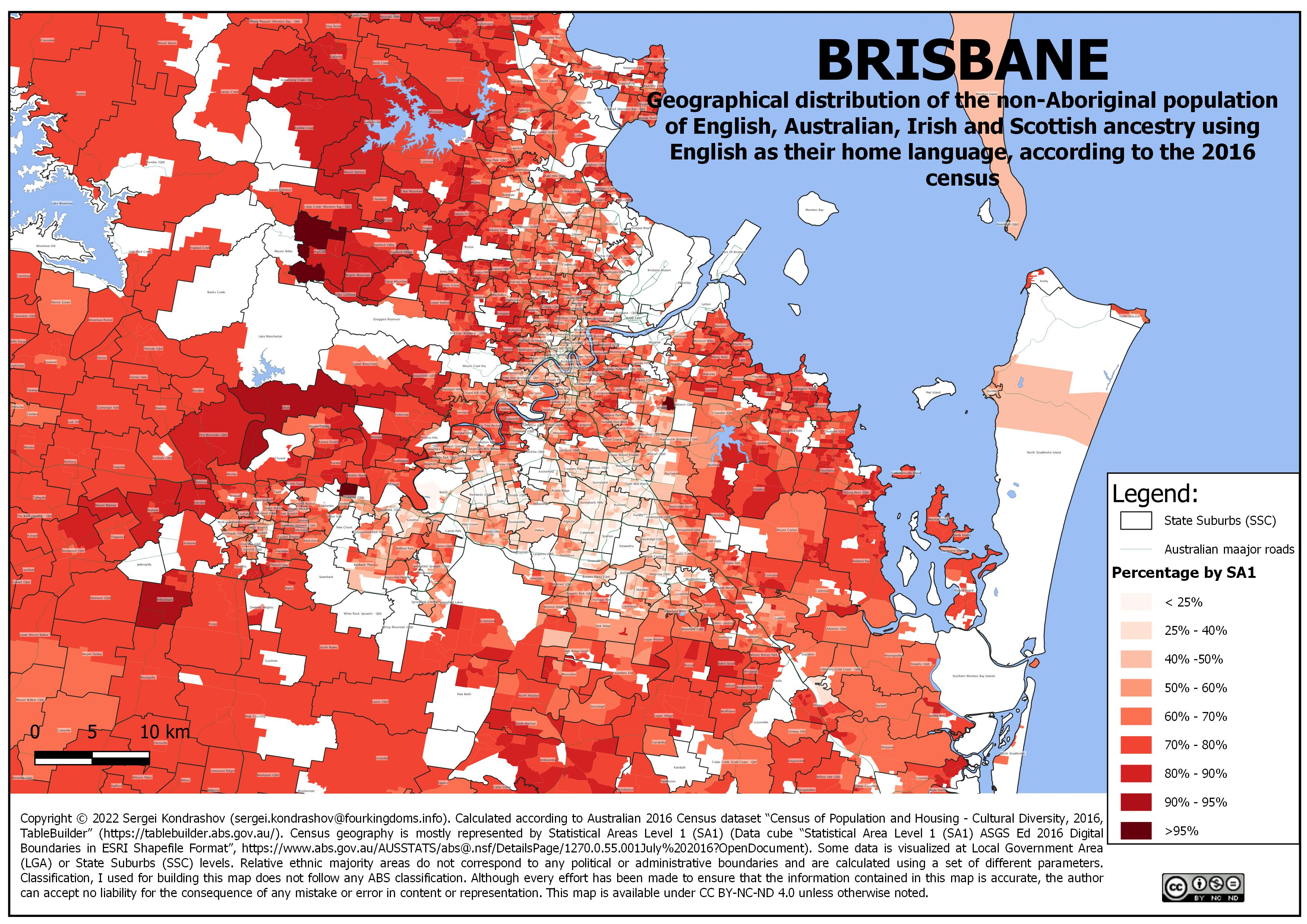
Geographical distribution of Brisbane's non-Indigenous population of English, Australian, Irish and Scottish origin.

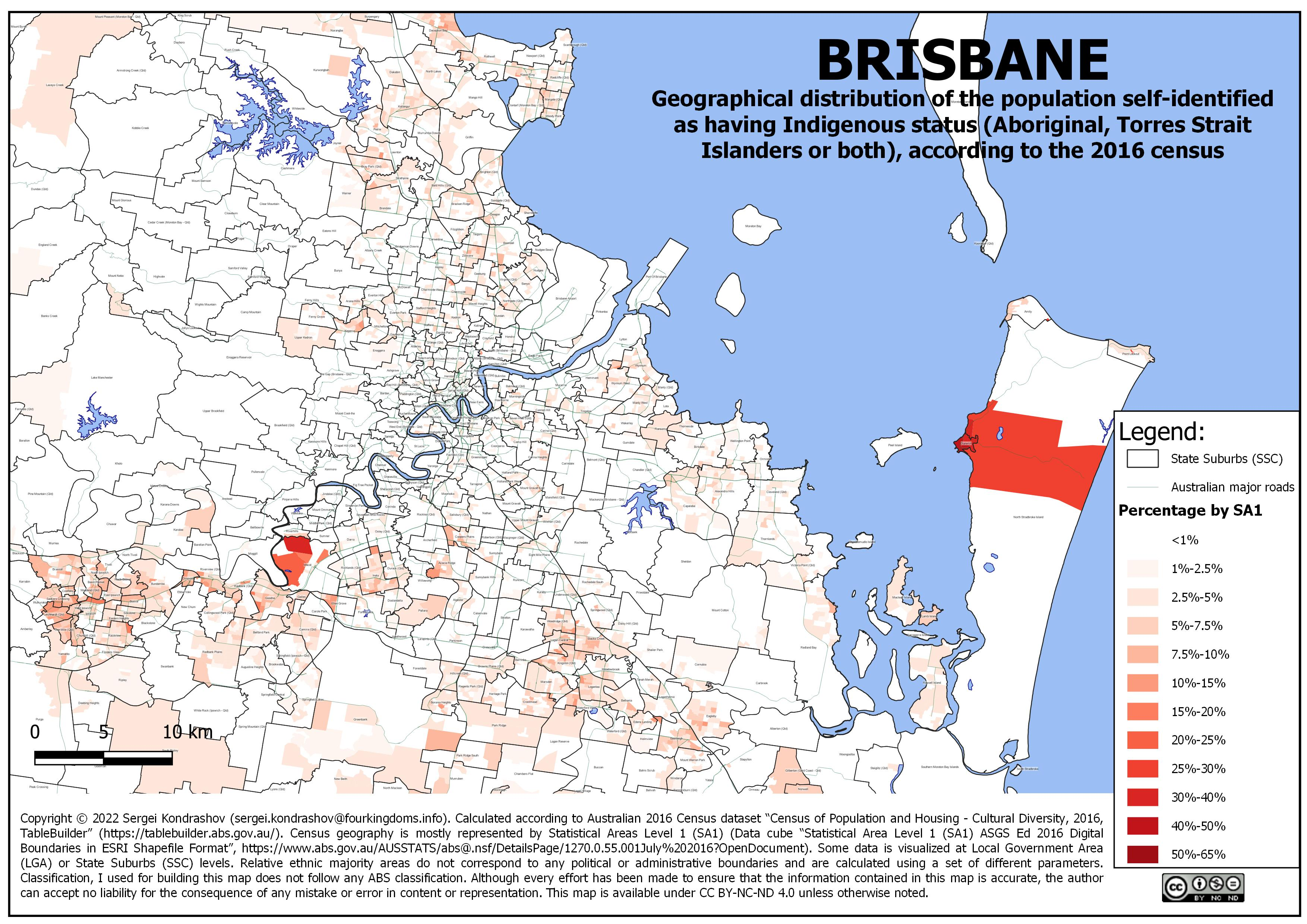
Geographical distribution of Brisbane's Indigenous Australian population.
