= Whitewashing in film =

Controversial casting practice in the film industry

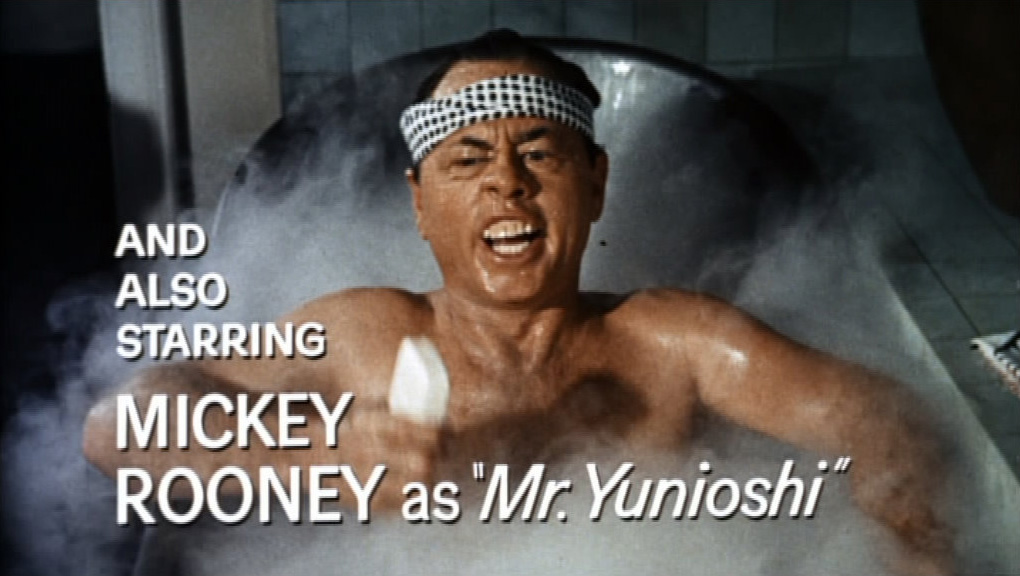
White actor Mickey Rooney wore yellowface to portray a Japanese landlord, I. Y. Yunioshi, in the 1961 film Breakfast at Tiffany's.

Whitewashing is a casting practice in the film industry in which white actors are cast in non-white roles. As defined by Merriam-Webster, to whitewash is "to alter...in a way that favors, features, or caters to white people: such as...casting a white performer in a role based on a nonwhite person or fictional character." According to the BBC, films in which white actors have played other races include all genres. African-American roles and roles of Asian descent have been whitewashed, as well as characters from the ancient world in the genre of classical and mythological films.

== History ==
In the early 20th century, white actors caricatured different ethnicities by brownface, blackface or yellowface, commonly exaggerating the perceived stereotypes of other ethnicities. For example, Swedish-born actor Warner Oland played the Chinese detective Charlie Chan in Charlie Chan Carries On (1931) and subsequent films. Because of the lack of characters of color in the film industry, these roles were well received at the time by viewers. Other non-Asian actors to portray Chinese detective Charlie Chan include Manuel Arbó, Sidney Toler, Roland Winters, Ross Martin, and Peter Ustinov.

There was a greater color diversity in film by the mid-20th-century and blackface mostly disappeared from the industry. The film Othello (1965) was an exception, as the white actor Laurence Olivier was cast as "the Moor" and wore blackface as the title character. New York Times film critic Bosley Crowther was critical of the 1965 Othello, referring to it as a "minstrel show".

The practice of "yellowface" extended into the 1960s. For instance, Mickey Rooney played a Japanese landlord in Breakfast at Tiffany's (1961). Professor David A. Schlossman said of Asian characters in particular, "Many of the Asian roles portrayed by White actors also contributed to the pantheon of cultural stereotypes in US national discourse." At the start of the 21st century, minorities were still under-represented in the film industry at different stages. While historically black roles are now generally cast with black actors, the practice of whitewashing applied to other minorities.

Guy Aoki said African Americans "have long felt the full brunt of the 'whitewashing' of roles" and that Asians have experienced it as well. Native Americans have also had their historic leaders and warriors portrayed by whites.

== Role of executives ==
The BBC said in 2015, "The practice of casting white actors in non-white roles is still prevalent in Hollywood – despite widespread condemnation and protest." A report in 2013 showed that 94% of film executives were white and that non-white people were under-represented as filmmakers and actors. The BBC explored two reasons for the casting practice: institutional racism and a belief that well-known white actors attract more audiences and maximize profits. Tom Rothman, the chairman of the Sony Pictures Motion Picture Group said, "I guess there's a certain institutional force and memory that exists out there. ... I think the industry's improving but I certainly agree with those who say we haven't come far enough fast enough."

Jeffery Mio, author of Multicultural Psychology: Understanding Our Diverse Communities, hypothesizes that the film industry, mostly white, hires people of similar backgrounds. Mio said of the rationale that only the most qualified actors are cast, "That's the argument that directors and casting directors make, but a lot of times ethnic actors will tell us that when they say we're just choosing the best actor, they mean we're choosing our friends, or people we're used to." Craig Detweiler, professor of film history at Pepperdine University, said, "There are [sic] a shortage of African American, Asian and Latino stars. For all Hollywood's progressive politics, its casting decisions look remarkably retrograde." In 2010, TheWrap ascribed the lack of racial diversity to institutional racism and a lack of bankable actors of color and that whitewashing in films like Prince of Persia: The Sands of Time and The Last Airbender aggravated the issue.

== Business aspect ==
Film professor Mitchell W. Block said studios adhered to casting norms as a matter of practicing business to appeal to investors and producers. Assistant professor of telecommunications Andrew J. Weaver said, "There is an assumption in Hollywood that whites would avoid movies with majority black casts, or any race cast for that matter. You see this whitewashing of films – even films that have minority characters written into them are being cast with whites." USA Today noted with films like Breakfast at Tiffany's (1961), A Mighty Heart (2007), and Pan (2015), "White actors continue to be top of mind for plum roles, despite the under-representation of people of color at the acting, directing and producing levels."

Director Ridley Scott said without the casting of big-name actors, his 2014 biblical epic film Exodus: Gods and Kings would never have been made, saying, "I can't mount a film of this budget ... and say that my lead actor is Mohammad so-and-so from such-and-such. ... I'm just not going to get financed." On casting white actors to maximize profits, David White, National Executive Director of the actors' union SAG-AFTRA said popular black actors such as Will Smith, Denzel Washington, and David Oyelowo refuted the casting rationale.

== Anti-whitewashing campaigns ==
Media watchdog groups have sought more authentic representations on screen, taking issue with casting decisions such as actor Johnny Depp as a Native American in The Lone Ranger (2013). With films from the United States receiving promotion in more global markets, the groups argue for roles that represent the diversity of audiences, who are seeking more authenticity. SAG-AFTRA's David White demurred on groups' opposition to casting white actors in non-white roles, "The laws insist that one's race not be part of the qualifications for a job," but he recognized that there was a lack of diversity in roles available. Law professor John Tehranian said, "Of course, there is nothing inherently wrong with race-blind casting, as long as it works both ways. But in reality, it never has; one rarely sees, for example, an African American, Latino, or Asian actor cast as a white character."

In 2016, a social media movement #StarringJohnCho created by Willam Yu trending on Twitter with photoshopped images of John Cho on popular movie posters. This sparked a discussion about the whitewashing of Asian characters in the media and the demand of Asian Americans in lead roles.

== Examples of associated cases ==
Below is a list of some of the films that have had their casting criticized as whitewashing:

Film	Year	Description
21	2008	The film about card counting features actors Jim Sturgess, Kate Bosworth, Jacob Pitts and Kevin Spacey in the lead roles. The film is based on the true story where a group of Asian American students and their teacher applied card counting to win significantly in gambling. Jeff Ma, who was among the students, said that the controversy was "overblown" and that the important aspect is that a talented actor would portray him. Ma, who is Chinese American, told USA Today, "I would have been a lot more insulted if they had chosen someone who was Japanese or Korean, just to have an Asian playing me."
30 Days of Night	2007	In the vampire horror film, actor Josh Hartnett plays Sheriff Eben Oleson in an Alaskan town. The originating comic book mini-series featured the character as Sheriff Eben Olemaun, who is of Inuit descent.
The Adventures of Buckaroo Banzai Across the 8th Dimension	1984	In the science fiction film, actor Peter Weller plays the titular Dr. Buckaroo Banzai, who is half-Japanese.
Aloha	2015	The romantic comedy features an all-white principal cast and is set in the state of Hawaii, which is over 70% non-white. One of the actors, Emma Stone, portrayed the character Allison Ng; the character is stated as having a mother of Swedish descent and a father of half Native Hawaiian and half Chinese descent.
Anna and the King of Siam	1946	In the historical drama film, actor Rex Harrison plays the Siamese king Mongkut.
Annihilation	2018	In the science fiction film, actresses Natalie Portman and Jennifer Jason Leigh play characters who in the novel are, respectively, of East Asian and half Native American descent. The characters' physical descriptions were only mentioned in passing in the second novel, following Annihilation.
Apache	1954	In the Western film, actor Burt Lancaster plays an Apache warrior.
Argo	2012	In the political thriller film based on a true story, actor Ben Affleck plays Tony Mendez, a CIA technical operations officer who is of Mexican descent. Tony Mendez said he did not think of himself as Hispanic.
Artemis Fowl	2020	In the science fantasy adventure film, actress Lara McDonnell plays Captain Holly Short, who in the book series was portrayed as having "nut-brown skin" of a "coffee complexion" (also described as "dark" and "coffee-coloured" in a scene set in a spa in the short story The Seventh Dwarf).
Avengers: Age of Ultron	2015	In the superhero film, Elizabeth Olsen and Aaron Taylor-Johnson play, respectively, Wanda and Pietro Maximoff—characters based on Scarlet Witch and Quicksilver, respectively—who in earlier comic incarnations were depicted as the children of white Americans, but were later depicted in most comics as being partly of Roma descent.
Batman Begins	2005	In the Batman film, actor Liam Neeson plays Ra's al Ghul, who in the comic books was portrayed as of Middle Eastern or East Asian descent.
A Beautiful Mind	2001	In the biographical film about John Nash, actress Jennifer Connelly plays Alicia Nash, who was born in El Salvador.
The Beguiled	2017	The drama film set in the Southern United States during the American Civil War was based on a 1966 novel that featured the mixed-race teenager Edwina and the black enslaved maid Mattie. Edwina was recast as a white teacher (played by Kirsten Dunst) and Mattie was cut out of the film. Director Sofia Coppola explained the removal, "I didn't want to brush over such an important topic in a light way. Young girls watch my films and this was not the depiction of an African-American character I would want to show them."
The Big Wedding	2013	In the comedy film, actor Ben Barnes sports a tan to play a Colombian character.
The Birth of a Nation	1915	Many black characters in the film are portrayed by white actors in blackface
Blade Trilogy	1998	In the superhero film series, actor Kris Kristofferson plays Blade's mentor Abraham Whistler, who is based on Jamal Afari, a character depicted as African-American in the comic books.
Breakfast at Tiffany's	1961	In the romantic comedy film, actor Mickey Rooney plays Mr. I. Y. Yunioshi, Holly Golightly's Asian neighbor.
Bullet Train	2022	In the action film based on the Japanese novel by Kōtarō Isaka, actors such as Brad Pitt and Joey King played the main characters while the setting was in Japan. The few Japanese characters in the movie had smaller roles, and many of extras were of non-Japanese descent, although Isaka would argue he did not write the characters with ethnicity in mind.
Charlie Chan Carries On	1931	Actor Warner Oland plays Chinese detective Charlie Chan in the film, as well as 15 other films featuring the character.
Clown in a Cornfield	2025	Actress Cassandra Potenza plays Janet, a character who was described as being Asian American in the book the movie is based on.
Cocaine Godmother	2018	In the biographical crime-drama television film, actress Catherine Zeta-Jones plays real-life Colombian drug lord Griselda Blanco.
The Conqueror	1956	In the historical film, actor John Wayne plays the title character Genghis Khan, a Mongol emperor.
The Dark Knight Rises	2012	In the Batman film, British actor Tom Hardy portrays Bane, who in the comics has origins in a fictional Latin American country located in the Caribbean. French actress Marion Cotillard portrays Talia al Ghul, who in the comics is of Middle Eastern or East Asian descent.
Death Note	2017	The English-language adaptation of the Japanese manga relocates the story to Seattle and renamed the protagonist Light Turner. USA Today reported that the film received backlash for whitewashing in casting white actors when Asian American actors could have been cast.
Divergent	2014	In the science fiction film, actor Theo James plays Four, whom the novel's author Veronica Roth had confirmed to be biracial.
Dr. No	1962	In the spy film, the first James Bond film, white actor Joseph Wiseman plays the titular Julius No, who is half-Chinese, while British actress Zena Marshall plays Miss Taro, another character of Asian descent.
Doctor Strange	2016	In the superhero film, actress Tilda Swinton plays the Ancient One, who in the comics is a man from Kamar-Taj, a fictional kingdom in the Himalayas.
Dragon Seed	1944	In the war drama film, actor Katharine Hepburn plays the Chinese protagonist Jade.
Dragonball Evolution	2009	In the film based on the Japanese manga Dragon Ball, actor Justin Chatwin plays the lead character Goku.
Drive	2011	In the crime film, actor Carey Mulligan plays Irene, a Latina woman in the original novel.
Earthsea	2004	In the television miniseries adaptation of the "Earthsea" novels, most characters, including the main character Ged, are portrayed as white. In the original novels by Ursula K. Le Guin, Ged's skin is dark red-brown and the majority of people of the world are non-white; Le Guin has criticized this casting.
Edge of Tomorrow	2014	In the science fiction film, actor Tom Cruise plays William Cage, a version of the novel's Japanese protagonist Keiji Kiriya.
Exodus: Gods and Kings	2014	In the Biblical epic film, actors Christian Bale, Joel Edgerton, Sigourney Weaver and Aaron Paul play Biblical figures who are of ancient Egyptian or Hebrew origin. Director Ridley Scott said about his casting, "I can't mount a film of this budget, where I have to rely on tax rebates in Spain, and say that my lead actor is Mohammad so-and-so from such-and-such. I'm just not going to get it financed. So the question doesn't even come up."
The Face of Fu Manchu	1965	In the thriller film, as well as four other films featuring the character, white actor Christopher Lee plays Asian Dr. Fu Manchu.
Fiesta	1947	In the musical drama film, actress Esther Williams plays the Mexican woman Maria Morales.
Firestarter	1984	In the novel the film is based on, the character of John Rainbird was written as Native American, but in the film, the character is portrayed by George C. Scott. Rainbird was also played by Malcolm McDowell in Firestarter: Rekindled (2002).
Ghost in the Shell	2017	The U.S. live action adaptation of the Japanese franchise featured several white actors, including Scarlett Johansson, Pilou Asbæk, and Michael Pitt, in the roles of Japanese animated characters. Pavan Shamdasani of Asia Times said, "The original is about as Asian as things get: Japanese cult manga, ground-breaking anime, Hong Kong-inspired locations, Eastern philosophy-based story. Most of that's been downright ignored with its big-screen adaptation, and Scarlett Johansson's casting as the dark-haired, obviously originally Asian lead sent netizens into a rage." Mamoru Oshii, director of the animated series, stated that the inspiration for the world of the film is not specifically Asian, nor is the ethnicity of the "shell" of the main character, specifically Japanese.
The Girl with All the Gifts	2016	In the science fiction film, Gemma Arterton plays Helen Justineau, a character depicted as black in the novel.
Gods and Monsters	1998	In the biographical drama about the last years of film director James Whale, white actress Lynn Redgrave plays Whale's housemaid Hanna. In the original book Father of Frankenstein by Christopher Bram, the character of Hanna is Maria, a maid of Mexican descent. Bill Condon, scriptwriter of the film, excused it saying that the European servants of that time were considered of "more value" and thus accentuated the economic power of Whale's character.
Gods of Egypt	2016	In the fantasy film, the principal cast of the Egyptian deities are portrayed by white European actors. No actual Egyptians were involved.
The Good Earth	1937	In the drama film about Chinese farmers, actors Paul Muni and Luise Rainer play Chinese characters.
The Great Wall	2016	In the film set in the Northern Song dynasty of ancient China, Matt Damon stars in the lead role of William Garin. Director Zhang Yimou defended the casting choice, stating that Damon is not playing a role that was originally conceived for a Chinese actor. Two examples of critics providing differing opinions on the film: Pavan Shamdasani of Asia Times said, "His 'white man saves China' shtick brought together the wide spectrum of film critics, respected historians and the internet's most thin-skinned trolls, in an outpouring of sheer outrage against blatant Hollywood whitewashing." Ann Hornaday, chief film critic for The Washington Post, writes that "early concerns about Damon playing a 'white savior' in the film turn out to be unfounded: his character, a mercenary soldier, is heroic, but also clearly a foil for the superior principles and courage of his Chinese allies."
Hell to Eternity	1960	In the war drama film based on a true story, actor Jeffrey Hunter plays Guy Gabaldon, who in real life was of Mexican descent.
The Hole	2027	In the psychological thriller film based on the 2016 novel of the same name by Pyun Hye-young, actor Theo James plays the protagonist Owen, an American professor, whereas the protagonist of the original novel, Oghi, is Korean.
The House of the Spirits	1993	In the period drama set in Chile, actors Meryl Streep, Glenn Close, Jeremy Irons, Antonio Banderas and Winona Ryder play Latin characters.
Hud	1963	In the drama film, actor Patricia Neal plays Alma, a housekeeper at a ranch, where in the original novel, Horseman, Pass By, the character was a black housekeeper named Halmea. A co-writer said of casting a white actor for the character, "We would have loved to keep her black for the movie. She has moral strength, she's benevolent, she's tough-minded, and she's secure in herself. So we would have loved to say to the world, 'Look, here's a hell of a woman, and she's black,' but in those days you simply couldn't do it, and not because the talent wasn't there — there were at least a half-dozen powerhouse black actresses who could have played that role. But the times weren't ready for it yet, and it was, of course, further complicated by the attempted rape."
The Human Stain	2003	In the drama film, actor Anthony Hopkins plays Coleman Silk, a former professor who is African-American and has been passing as white.
The Hunger Games	2012	In the science fiction adventure film, actor Jennifer Lawrence stars as Katniss Everdeen, who author Suzanne Collins described to have the typical look of her district: olive skin, straight black hair, and grey eyes. Nicola Balkind in Fan Phenomena: The Hunger Games said that readers perceived Katniss and her people to be non-white; the film's casting call for Katniss specified a Caucasian appearance. Collins said Katniss as well as Gale "were not particularly intended to be biracial" as readers thought, "It is a time period where hundreds of years have passed from now. There's been a lot of ethnic mixing." Deidre Anne Evans Garriott, Whitney Elaine Jones and Julie Elizabeth Tyler said about the casting call, "Calling for a Caucasian actress clearly excludes other capable actresses and privileges whiteness in Hollywood. ... This casting choice over an actress who may look more like the Katniss Collins describes—and who may or may not self-identify as Caucasian—may challenge traditional ideas of beauty, and how Western society associates beauty with heroism."
Imitation of Life	1959	In the romantic drama film, actor Susan Kohner plays Sarah Jane, a mixed ethnicity woman who can pass as white.
The King and I	1956	In the musical film, Yul Brynner plays the Thai king Mongkut. Despite Brynner claiming to have distant Mongolian ancestry, Brynner is widely considered a white actor.
The King of Fighters	2010	In the martial arts action film based on the video game series, actor Sean Faris stars as the Japanese Kyo Kusanagi.
The Last Airbender	2010	In the fantasy adventure film based on the TV series Avatar: The Last Airbender, white actors play the protagonists, whose characters are depicted as East Asian and Inuit in the TV series. In contrast, the antagonists, whose characters have some of the palest skin of the nations portrayed in the original animation, were largely played by darker-skinned South Asian and Middle Eastern actors. Nicola Peltz, who plays the main female character Katara, is half Jewish on her father's side. In August 2020, Joey King, who had auditioned to play Katara in the film and is also half-Jewish, stated that "I do not believe a white woman should play a character of color. Not me or any white woman for that matter."
Lawrence of Arabia	1962	In the historical epic film, actor Alec Guinness plays the Arab Prince Faisal.
Lilo & Stitch	2025	In the science fiction comedy remake of the 2002 film Lilo & Stitch, mixed White, Filipino, and Hawaiian actress Sydney Agudong portrays Nani, who is of native Hawaiian descent.
The Lincoln Lawyer	2011	In the legal drama film based on the novel by Michael Connelly, actor Matthew McConaughey portrays Mickey Haller, who is of Mexican descent. The 2022 Netflix series rectified this.
The Lone Ranger	2013	In the Western film, actor Johnny Depp plays the Comanche sidekick Tonto. Depp has claimed on several occasions that he has some Cherokee or Comanche ancestry.
Lost Boundaries	1949	In the drama film based on a true story, white actors play members of a family that is partly African-American but passes as white.
Lost Horizon	1973	In this fantasy drama film, English actor John Gielgud plays the role of Chang, a Tibetan lama. The same role was played by other British actors in versions of the story filmed in 1937 (H. B. Warner) and 1960 (Claude Rains).
Maestro	2023	In the biographical drama film, actress Carey Mulligan plays Felicia Montealegre Bernstein, who was of Costa Rican and Jewish descent. Similar criticism was leveled against star Bradley Cooper in portraying the film's Jewish subject Leonard Bernstein with a large prosthetic nose.
A Majority of One	1961	In the comedy film, actor Alec Guinness plays a Japanese businessman.
The Martian	2015	In the science fiction film based on the 2011 novel, actress Mackenzie Davis plays Mission Control satellite planner Mindy Park. Author Andy Weir said he "perceived" Mindy Park as Korean but said he did not explicitly write her as Korean. Another character from the book, Venkat Kapoor, who is of Hindu descent, also became Vincent Kapoor in the film, and is played by Chiwetel Ejiofor, a British actor of Nigerian descent.
The Mask of Fu Manchu	1932	In the adventure film, Anglo-Indian actor Boris Karloff and white actress Myrna Loy play Asians Fu Manchu and Fah Lo See. The Chinese embassy in Washington, D.C. issued a formal complaint against the film.
A Mighty Heart	2007	In the drama film based on the memoir, white actor Angelina Jolie plays Mariane Pearl, a French-born woman of Afro-Cuban descent.
Mortal Kombat	1995	In the martial arts action film based on the video game series, actor Christopher Lambert plays Raiden, a Japanese god.
The Mysterious Dr. Fu Manchu	1929	In the drama film, white actor Warner Oland plays Asian Fu Manchu, and does so in three other films featuring the character.
The New Mutants	2020	In the horror comic book film, actor Henry Zaga, who is light-skinned and of mixed Afro-Brazilian heritage, plays Sunspot, who in the original comics was a dark-skinned Afro-Brazilian. On this matter, comics co-creator Bob McLeod said: "I was very disappointed that Roberto isn't short and dark-skinned. Yet another example of Hollywood white-washing. There's just no excuse. So basically, [director Josh Boone] erased everything I contributed to the way the characters look."
Nightflyers	1987	In the science fiction film, actor Catherine Mary Stewart plays Miranda Dorlac, who in the originating 1980 novella by George R. R. Martin was the black character Melantha Jhirl.
Noah	2014	The Biblical epic film features an all-white cast. White actor Russell Crowe plays the Biblical figure Noah. However, "fittingly for a Biblical story", two of the characters are played by Ashkenazi actors (Jennifer Connelly and Logan Lerman). Screenwriter Ari Handel said, "From the beginning, we were concerned about casting, the issue of race. What we realized is that this story is functioning at the level of myth, and as a mythical story, the race of the individuals doesn't matter. They're supposed to be stand-ins for all people. ... You either try to put everything in there, which just calls attention to it, or you just say, 'Let's make that not a factor, because we're trying to deal with everyman.'" Handel said the race of Noah's family was cast based on the foremost casting of Russell Crowe and that he avoided casting other races for people outside the family as not to show "racial differences between who lived and who died" and as a result make "a terrible, terrible statement".
Not Without My Daughter	1991	In the drama film, actor Alfred Molina, who is of Italian and Spanish descent, plays Sayyed Bozorg "Moody" Mahmoody, an Iranian physician.
Octopussy	1983	In this James Bond film, white actor Louis Jourdan plays Kamal Khan, an Afghan prince.
Othello	1951	In the film based on William Shakespeare's tragedy play Othello (c. 1603), actor Orson Welles plays in blackface the character Othello, the Moor of Venice.
Othello	1955	In the film based on William Shakespeare's tragedy play Othello (c. 1603), actor Sergei Bondarchuk plays in blackface the character Othello, the Moor of Venice.
Othello	1965	In the film based on William Shakespeare's tragedy play Othello (c. 1603), actor Laurence Olivier plays in blackface the character Othello, the Moor of Venice.
The Outsider	1961	In the biographical film, actor Tony Curtis plays Ira Hayes, a U.S. Marine of Native American descent.
Pan	2015	In the fantasy film, actor Rooney Mara plays Tiger Lily, a Native American character.
The Party	1968	In the comedy film, actor Peter Sellers plays an Indian actor.
A Passage to India	1984	In the historical drama film, actor Alec Guinness plays the Indian character Professor Godbole.
Pay It Forward	2000	In the drama film based on a novel, actor Kevin Spacey plays teacher Eugene Simonet. In the original book, the teacher is Reuben St. Clair, who is of African American descent.
Pinky	1949	In the race drama film, actor Jeanne Crain plays a partly African American character who can pass as white.
Power Rangers	2017	In the superhero film based on the television series, actress Elizabeth Banks plays Rita Repulsa, a role previously played by Japanese actress Machiko Soga in its source series Kyōryū Sentai Zyuranger and in additional footage created specifically for use in American superhero show Power Rangers. While Soga's appearances were dubbed in English for the first season of Mighty Morphin Power Rangers, Hispanic actress Julia Cortez physically played the part in Mighty Morphin Power Rangers: The Movie. Soga later reappeared as the character in Power Rangers Mystic Force, though her performance had been originally intended for a different, unrelated character in source series Mahō Sentai Magiranger. All appearances of the character were dubbed in English by American voice actress Barbara Goodson, with the exception of the later appearance of Soga in Mystic Force, in which Rita Repulsa was voiced by New Zealand actress Susan Brady.
The Prince of Egypt	1998	A fantasy cartoon movie about the story of Moses in which the majority of the characters are voiced by actors primarily of European descent.
Prince of Persia: The Sands of Time	2010	The mostly-white ensemble cast portray Persians. The actor Jake Gyllenhaal who plays the main character is half Jewish on his mother's side.
Remo Williams: The Adventure Begins	1985	In the action-adventure film, actor Joel Grey plays a Korean martial arts master who trains Remo Williams.
The Rescuers Down Under	1990	The story team advocated for an Aboriginal Australian child actor to voice Cody. According to storyboard artist Brenda Chapman, Katzenberg overrode this idea, casting "a little white blonde kid" and giving Cody a matching design.
Scarface	1983	Al Pacino, an Italian-American actor, plays Cuban drug lord Tony Montana, while Mary Elizabeth Mastrantonio plays his sister.
Short Circuit	1986	In the science fiction films, actor Fisher Stevens plays an Indian character.
Short Circuit 2	1988	In the science fiction films, actor Fisher Stevens plays an Indian character.
Show Boat	1951	In the romantic drama film, actor Ava Gardner plays Julie, a character of mixed ethnicity. An actor of mixed ethnicity, Lena Horne, was originally cast to play Julie before the studio required a casting change.
The Social Network	2010	In the drama film, biracial actor Max Minghella plays the ConnectU co-founder Divya Narendra, who is of Indian descent. Director David Fincher said, "we had read an enormous, probably a hundred, Indian actors who came in to read for Divya and I saw footage of the actual Divya Narendra who I've met now and he's kind of like Warren Beatty. There's nothing, aside from being incredibly tan, there's almost nothing that seems particularly ethnic about him ... and we couldn't find somebody with that sort of smoothness. I looked and I looked and I looked. We went to London, Paris, Montreal, we cast from everywhere and finally in the end I just felt that Max had the most, kind of, I just wanted to make sure that Divya was an equal. He was the most important third wheel in this triumvirate." Actor Aziz Ansari commented, "These days, Indian people, real Indian people, pop up way more in film and television, but fake Indians are still around more than you think. I loved 'The Social Network,' but I have a hard time understanding why the Indian-American Harvard student Divya Narendra was played by Max Minghella, a half-Chinese, half-Italian British actor."
The Son of the Sheik	1926	In the adventure drama film, actor Rudolph Valentino plays the lead Arab character.
Spawn	1997	In the superhero film, actor D. B. Sweeney plays Terry Fitzgerald, who is African-American in the comics. Spawn creator and executive producer on the film Todd McFarlane said, "[the decision] was somewhat based on the cold reality that if people perceive this as a black movie there would be no way we would receive the 45 million we were after. Terry's skin color has not been a major issue but what Terry stands for is more important...Every decision that I was directly involved in was based upon what would appeal to the greatest number of people while at the same time not offending the core audience."
Speed Racer	2008	In the film, Caucasian actors play the characters that are originally Asian in the Japanese manga and anime adaptation. Similarly, the names of the characters, all originally Japanese, are changed in favor of its Western regionalization. However, the character of Taejo Togokahn, played by Korean performer Rain, was created for the film as an homage.
Star Trek Into Darkness	2013	In the science fiction film, actor Benedict Cumberbatch plays the villain Khan Noonien Singh, who is of Indian descent. In his previous cinematic and television appearances (Star Trek II: The Wrath of Khan and "Space Seed"), the character is portrayed by Mexican actor of European descent Ricardo Montalbán.
Starship Troopers	1997	In the science fiction film, actor Casper Van Dien plays John Rico. In the original book, the character was Juan Rico of Filipino descent.
Stonewall	2015	The film about the Stonewall riots constructs a white male fictional protagonist who is shown to be a powerful catalyst to the historical riots. This is done most explicitly by reframing historical moments and having them driven by him, thereby erasing the actual involvement of transgender and lesbian women of color, the historical actors. Director Roland Emmerich, himself gay, said, "I didn't make this movie only for gay people, I made it also for straight people. I kind of found out, in the testing process, that actually, for straight people, [Danny] is a very easy in. Danny's very straight-acting. He gets mistreated because of that. [Straight audiences] can feel for him." He said he and screenwriter Jon Robin Baitz consulted select historians and veterans and said, "There were only a couple of transgender women in the Stonewall ever. They were like a minority."
Street Fighter	2026	In the live action adaptation of the video games series, comedian Andrew Schulz plays Dan Hibiki, a Hong Konger of Japanese descent. Additionally, Noah Centineo plays Ken Masters, a multiracial Japanese American.
Stuck	2007	In the thriller film based on a true story, actor Mena Suvari plays Brandi Boski, who is based on Chante Jawan Mallardin who is African American.
Tetris	2023	In the biographical film, Welsh actor Taron Egerton plays video game publisher Henk Rogers, who is Dutch-Indonesian.
The Teahouse of the August Moon	1956	In the comedy film, actor Marlon Brando plays the Japanese character Sakini.
The Ten Commandments	1956	In the Biblical epic film, an ensemble cast composed almost entirely of non-Middle Eastern actors play Biblical figures of Jewish origin. Moses is played by Charlton Heston and Ramesses II is played by Yul Brynner.
The Thief of Bagdad	1924	In the swashbuckler film, actor Douglas Fairbanks plays the lead Arab character.
Touch of Evil	1958	In the crime noir, actor Charlton Heston plays Miguel Vargas, a Mexican drug enforcement official.
The Unforgiven	1960	In the western film, actress Audrey Hepburn plays a Native American.
Wanted	2008	In the action film, actress Angelina Jolie plays Fox, who is African-American in the comics and modeled on actress Halle Berry.
Warm Bodies	2013	In the zombie comedy film, actress Analeigh Tipton plays Nora, who is depicted in the book as half-Ethiopian.
The Warriors	1979	In the action film, white actors portray the main cast of characters who were originally people of color in the novel by Sol Yurick. Director Walter Hill recalled, "Paramount wasn't too high on the idea of an all black cast, as they explained, for commercial reasons."
West Side Story	1961	In the romantic musical film, actress Natalie Wood plays Maria, who is of Puerto Rican descent, while George Chakiris plays her brother.
Whiskey Tango Foxtrot	2016	In the comedy-drama film based on a memoir and set in Afghanistan, actors Christopher Abbott and Alfred Molina portray Afghan characters. Tina Fey, who produced and starred in the film, said, "I had a lot of say. If your next question is, why is Chris Abbott not Afghan? — I did beg [the casting directors], 'Guys, my preference would be a native speaker.' They pleaded their case that Chris [was] their choice." Fey added, "Tricky thing is, Afghans [can be] Caucasians."
The Wind and the Lion	1975	In the historical film, actor Sean Connery plays Mulai Ahmed er Raisuni, a leader of Berber insurrectionists.
World Trade Center	2006	In the disaster drama film based on the September 11 attacks, actor William Mapother plays Marine Sergeant Jason Thomas, who in real life is black.
Wuthering Heights	2026	In the romantic period drama film based on the novel Wuthering Heights by Emily Brontë, actor Jacob Elordi plays Heathcliff, who is described as racially ambiguous but possessing dark skin in the novel; references to Heathcliff's appearance included being "a dark-skinned gipsy" to "a little Lascar, or an American or Spanish castaway".
The Year of Living Dangerously	1982	In the drama film, actress Linda Hunt plays a male Chinese Australian dwarf.

== Examples of whitewashing experiences in pre-production ==
Prior to Kiss the Girls (1997), author James Patterson was offered seven figures for the movie rights to the Alex Cross books on the condition that the African-American central character be changed to white. Patterson refused, saying of the incident, "When I wrote the first Alex Cross book, I didn’t have a lot of money and Hollywood came calling — knock, knock, knock, knock, knock. They offered seven figures, and I did not have a lot of money. They said, 'We just want one change; we want Alex to be a white guy.' And I said, 'Fuck you.'”

Salma Hayek stated that she was passed over for two large comedy roles due to her ethnicity. While the directors thought Hayek was the best actress for those roles, they believed studios would not want a Mexican lead at time. The directors later said that they regretted their decision and that Hayek's audition was better than who they cast for the movies. She also mentioned that producers of The House of the Spirits (1993) did not want to cast Latinos outside of stereotypical roles. Hayek asserted that she was denied even a chance to audition for the film because "they were not hiring Latinos for Latino roles. They were not hiring Latinos period — unless it was the maid or the prostitute. And that part was not a maid or a prostitute."

Justin Lin, director of Better Luck Tomorrow (2002), revealed that he was told by potential investors - some of whom were Asian Americans - to add a white male lead, Macaulay Culkin, if he wanted million dollar investment for his movie, which was based on an Asian American story. Lin turned down the offer. MC Hammer provided funding and Lin was very grateful for his generosity.

The writers of Harold & Kumar Go to White Castle (2004), Jon Hurwitz and Hayden Schlossberg, said that they were really sick of seeing teen movies that were one-dimensional and that had characters that did not match the diversity of their group of friends. Because the main characters were Asian American, they had difficulty pitching their screenplay to studios. John Cho, who played the lead character Harold Lee, stated that, to avoid studios’ attempt to cast white actors, the writers included scenes that directly related to the characters’ ethnicities. Cho recalled, “It had to be rooted in that as a defense mechanism so that they wouldn’t get turned white.” Kal Penn mentioned that the reason the movie was greenlit was because there were two junior execs at New Line Cinema who were given this new project and decided to take a chance on it. Penn added, "The older people around Hollywood, the older people in town were like, 'We don't know if America is ready for two Asian American men as leads in a comedy.'"

According to author Kevin Kwan, a potential producer wanted to change the heroine into a white girl for Crazy Rich Asians (2018). He responded that the producer missed the entire point of his book and rejected the offer. Shirley Li of Entertainment Weekly wrote, "To whitewash Rachel would take away an integral part of the character’s identity and also be a detriment to the story itself."

Lulu Wang, director of The Farewell (2019), also faced whitewashing obstacles with her film about a Chinese-American family. She mentioned that many disheartening encounters with American financiers who wanted to include a "prominent white character into the narrative, and punch up the nuanced drama to turn it into a broad comedy." Wang later created an episode on This American Life based on her family, which caught the attention of producer Chris Weitz who helped secure financing.

When casting for Harriet (2019), producer/writer Gregory Allen Howard said that a film studio executive said to him, "'This script is fantastic. Let's get Julia Roberts to play Harriet Tubman.' He then went on to say, "When someone pointed out that Roberts couldn’t be Harriet, the executive responded, 'It was so long ago. No one is going to know the difference.' "

Ed Skrein was initially cast in the 2019 Hellboy reboot as Major Ben Daimio, a character of Asian descent from the Hellboy comic books. After the casting received criticism on social media, Skrein withdrew, stating, "Representation of ethnic diversity is important, especially to me as I have a mixed heritage family. It is our responsibility to make moral decisions in difficult times and to give voice to inclusivity." According to The Hollywood Reporter, "this is the first time an actor has exited such a high-profile project in response to public criticism" over whitewashing. Daniel Dae Kim was cast to replace Skrein.

The filmmakers behind The Paper Tigers (2020) planned to have a male Asian-American main character with a minority leading cast for their martial arts comedy film. They knew that it would be difficult to find studio support due to whitewashing. When pitched to Hollywood producers, they were offered $4 million with a caveat that there would be no Asian-American lead character and suggested a white lead character to be played by Bruce Willis instead. They were also asked to write a role for Nicolas Cage. The team declined the offer and request. Director Bao Tran mentioned that Hollywood usually sent their mid-level executives who were also people of color to be the messengers of whitewashing. The team turned to crowdfunding via Kickstarter and a few local investors to fund their film instead and stay true to their vision.

For Everything Everywhere All at Once (2022), director Daniel Kwan talked about whitewashing with studios, "The casting was probably one of the hardest things of the whole process. They're like, 'Oh, should we try a white actor?'...or 'Should we find other types of people that might actually bring in the money?'" He continued, "We had to have some really hard conversations with people to basically put our foot down and say, 'No, this was written for a Chinese family.'" Director Daniel Scheinert said that while it took a little longer, they ultimately ended up with an ideal cast.

For the Tubi film, Worth the Wait (2025), producers faced pressure from Hollywood financiers to cast white male lead instead of having an all-Asian ensemble cast. Rachel Tan recalled, "They gave me a list of white guys we could cast. If we could give one of the roles to them, we could get funded." Tan mentioned that investors held the belief that Asian male characters are not bankable with little appeal for Western audiences. Tan and her team ignored the suggestion and completed the film with their goal of an all-Asian cast breaking stereotypes.

== See also ==
- Color-blind casting
- Racebending
- White savior narrative in film
- Straightwashing
- Race in horror films
- Tokenism
- Whitewashing in art
