= The Hole (2027 film) =

Upcoming American-South Korean film

- Directed by: Kim Jee-woon
- Screenplay by: Christopher Chen
- Based on: The Hole by Pyun Hye-young
- Produced by: Sam Esmail; Chad Hamilton; Nick Krishnamurthy; Kimberly Steward; Alex Foster; Andy Sorgie; Jay Choi; Kim Jee-woon
- Starring: Theo James; Yeom Hye-ran; Jung Ho-yeon; Christian Slater
- Production companies: Anthology Studios; K. Period Media; Esmail Corp; Paisan
- Distributed by: Orion Pictures (through Amazon MGM Studios)
- Release date: June 25, 2027 (United States)
- Countries: United States; South Korea
- Languages: English; Korean

The Hole is an upcoming psychological thriller film directed by Kim Jee-woon and adapted by Christopher Chen from the 2016 novel by Pyun Hye-young. It is starring Theo James, Hoyeon, Yeom Hye-ran and Christian Slater. It is scheduled to be released by Orion Pictures on 25 June 2027.

== Cast ==
- Theo James
- Yeom Hye-ran
- Jung Ho-yeon
- Christian Slater

== Production ==
=== Development ===
In April 2024, Kim Jee-woon was reported to be directing an adaptation of the thriller novel The Hole (2016) by Pyun Hye-young, from a script by Christopher Chen. It is produced by Anthology Studios, K. Period Media, and Esmail Corp. Sam Esmail, Chad Hamilton, and Nick Krishnamurthy are producers for Esmail Corp alongside Kimberly Steward and Alex Foster for K Period Media and Andy Sorgie for Paisan with Jay Choi and Jee-woon also producers. In May 2025, Orion Pictures acquired worldwide distribution rights.

Speaking in June 2025, Pyun Hye-young said that "I hope the film will serve as an extension of its universe" with the film having aspects of female characters absent from the novel, and that she "entrusted the adaptation fully to the screenwriter".

=== Casting and whitewashing criticism ===
The cast is led by Theo James, Jung Ho-yeon, Yeom Hye-ran, and Christian Slater, with James joining the cast in October 2024 and Ho-yeon the following month.

The casting of British actor Theo James drew criticism for changing the ethnicity and nationality of the protagonist in Pyun Hye-young's original novel. While the novel centers on Oghi, a Korean university professor, the film adaptation instead features James as Owen, an American professor living in South Korea who has married into a Korean family.

In October 2024, Vanessa Armstrong of Reactor highlighted the change from a Korean protagonist to a white American character, describing it as whitewashing and questioning whether the alteration would lead to further differences from the source material.

In a June 2025 interview with The Dong-A Ilbo, Pyun discussed the adaptation's changes, explaining that the original Korean setting had been reworked to center on an international couple. She expressed hope that the film would expand upon the novel rather than reproduce it exactly, and said that linguistic and cultural differences could heighten its suspense. Pyun also stated that she had entrusted the adaptation to screenwriter Christopher Chen.

=== Filming ===
Principal photography was scheduled to start in the first half of 2025 with filming taking place in both the United States and South Korea.

== Release ==
The film is scheduled to be released in the United States by Orion Pictures on 25 June 2027.
