= Alfred Aghan =

New Zealand WWI Soldier

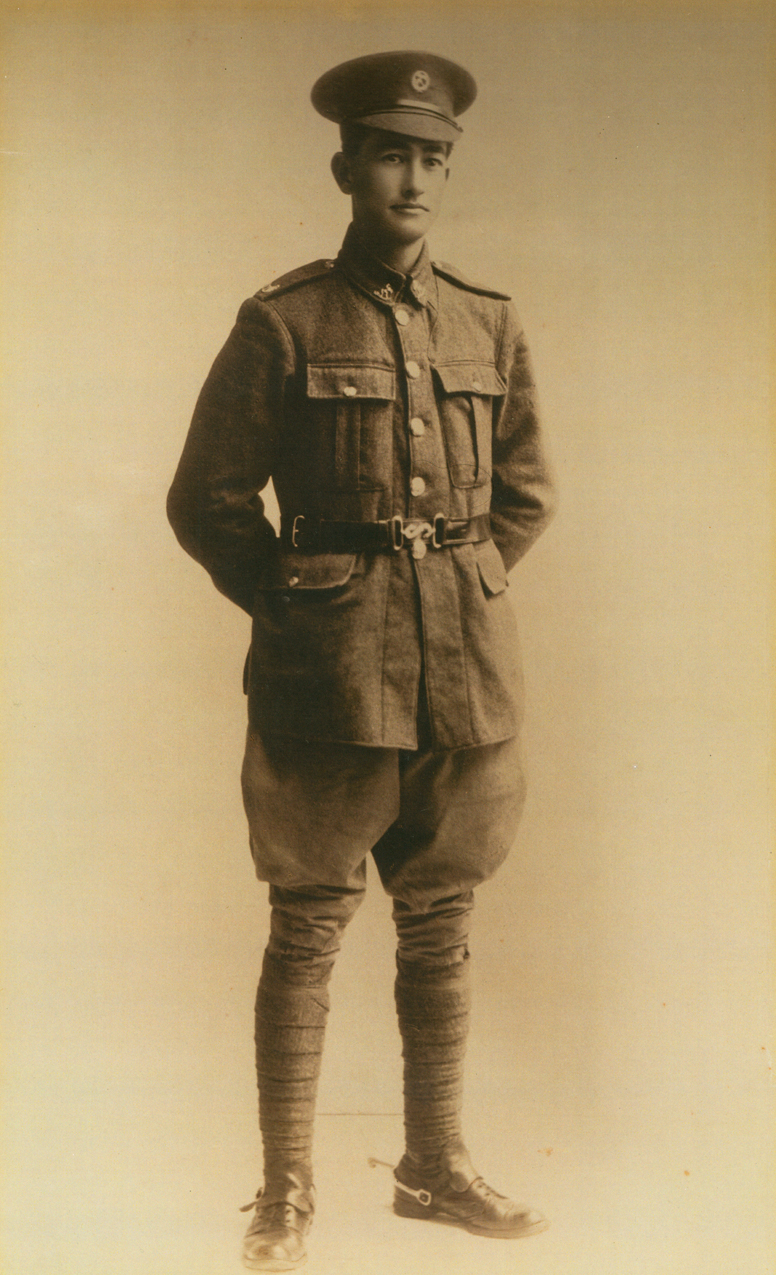
- Portrait of Alfred Aghan
- Born: 19 July 1890; Victoria, Australia
- Died: 14 October 1961 (age 71)
- Relatives: David Aghan
- Military career
- Allegiance: New Zealand Australia
- Branch: Army
- Service years: 1916–1918
- Nickname: Alf
- Service number: WWI 13300
- Unit: New Zealand Mounted Rifles
- Conflicts: 1914–1916 Egypt
- Awards: British War Medal (1914–1920)

Alfred John Aghan (19 Jul 1890 – 14 Oct 1961), also known as Alfred or Alf Ah Gan, was an Australian Chinese soldier who fought in the New Zealand Army during World War I.

== Life and First World War ==
Aghan was born in Victoria, Australia on 19 July 1890, to mother Elizabeth Southgate and father William Ah Gan and was one of eleven children. In 1904, the 'Ah Gan' family anglicised their name to Aghan during the White Australia policy. Despite being Australian-born with Chinese heritage, the brothers were unable to enlist for service in Australia. The Defence Act in place during WWI meant that some Australians with Chinese ancestry were able to overcome barriers of discrimination that were put in place to deter Chinese and other minority groups from the war effort.

At age 25, Aghan left his job in Melbourne as a French polisher and, with his brother David, moved to New Zealand. Alfred and David joined their brother and sister, who already lived in Hastings, and stayed at that address before enlistment. The brothers socialised as Australians and not Chinese, in order to successfully enlist, as they were members of the British Empire by virtue of being Australian citizens.

Aghan left New Zealand on the HMNZT Willochra on 17 April 1915. Alfred and his brother David served with the Auckland Mounted Rifles from 1916 to 1918 in Egypt and Palestine. As part of the 13 Squadron and 13th Mounted Rifles, where Aghan held the title of Private and Trooper. He also did a brief transfer to the Veterinary Corps.

== Personal life & collections ==
Aghan married Violet Catherine Reardon in 1921.

In 1935, he was president of the New Zealand branch of the Returned Soldiers' League.

In 2016, a descent of Aghan, Brett Aghan, gifted Auckland War Memorial Museum a selection of artefacts belonging to Albert Aghan to add to their collections.
