= Kim Un-su =

South Korean writer (born 1972)

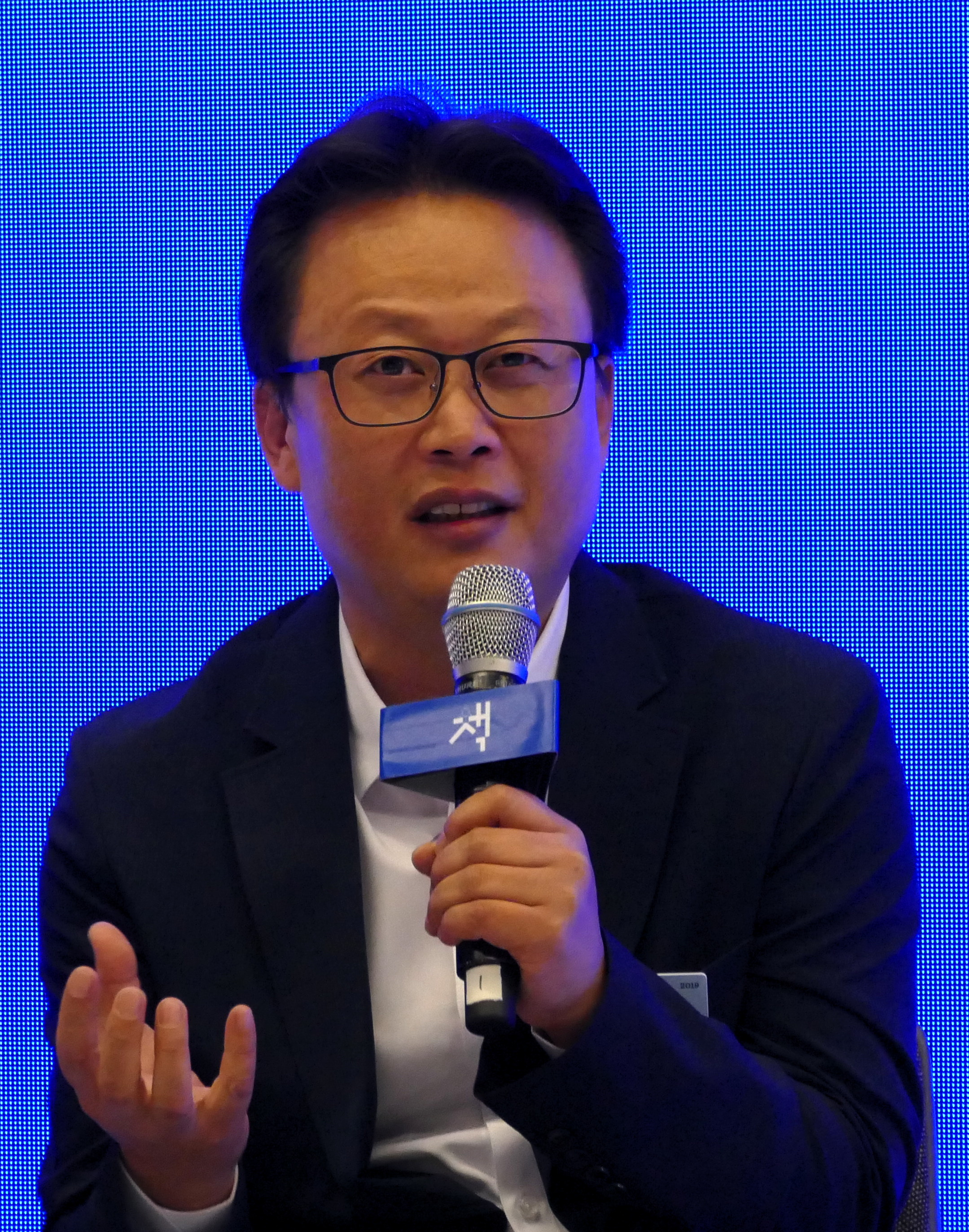
- Kim in 2019
- Born: 1972 (age 53–54); Busan, South Korea
- Education: Kyung Hee University
- Writing career
- Notable work: The Plotters (설계자들) (2010)

Korean name
- Hangul: 김언수
- RR: Gim Eonsu
- MR: Kim Ŏnsu

Kim Un-su (Korean: 김언수; born 1972) is a South Korean writer. He studied Korean literature at Kyung Hee University, where he also completed master's level coursework. He made his literary debut in the fall of 2002 with his short story ”Easy Writing Lessons” (참 쉽게 배우는 글짓기교실 ”Cham shipgye baeuneun geuljitgigyosil”) and in 2003 went on to win the Jinju News Writing Contest with ”Danbaljang Street” (단발장 스트리트 “Danbaljang seuteuriteu”). In 2006, ”Breaking up with Friday” (프라이데이와 결별하다 “Peuraidaewa gyeolbyeolhada”) won the Dong-a Ilbo New Writer's Contest, and his first novel The Cabinet (캐비닛 Kaebinit) won the 12th Munhakdongne Novel Award. His 2016 novel Hot Blood (뜨거운 피 Tteugeoun Pi) was awarded the 22nd Hahn Moo-Sook Literary Prize.

In 2017, Kim broke into the international literary scene when his 2010 literary thriller The Plotters (설계자들 Seolgyejadeul) was published in French and shortlisted for the Grand Prix de Literature Policière.The Plotters subsequently became Kim's English translation debut January 2019 when it was published by Knopf Doubleday Publishing Group to positive critical review in the United States, being listed as an “Editor's Choice" title by New York Times Book Review as well as with "This Winter's Best Thrillers" by Chicago Review of Books. The audiobook was produced in 2019 by Penguin Random House and narrated by British actor Arthur Lee.

== Life ==
Kim Un-su was born and raised in the South Korean port city of Busan, where his family has lived for generations. He explored the streets of Busan as a child, walked them with his first girlfriend whom he met at the age of 17, and aimlessly wandered them when he failed his college entrance exam. But he confesses growing tired of his hometown after spending so many years there. He only came to appreciate it again when he revisited his memories of Busan and his seaside home while writing the novel Tteugeoun Pi (뜨거운 피 Hot Blood).

== Writing ==
Kim Un-su's characters are often lonely. Loneliness, according to Kim, is the essence of human nature and stems from people's misunderstanding that they are the only ones hurt. He believes that “art communicates and shakes hands” to assuage this loneliness.

Based on that belief, Kim creates surreal stories involving dramatic and exaggerated characters. His novel Kaebinit (캐비닛 The Cabinet) is about people who, distrusting the ever-changing world around them, deny their past and erase their memories to create new ones. Seolgyejadeul (설계자들 The Plotters) is a novel based on the premise that there were professional “plotters” behind every history-changing murder. The novel is set to be made into a motion picture directed by Hur Jin-ho. Tteugeoun Pi (뜨거운 피 Hot Blood), which contains many autobiographical elements, follows the lives of thugs, loan sharks, prostitutes, and other shady characters who live by the Busan seaside.

== Works ==
- 캐비닛 (The Cabinet) - 2006
- 설계자들 (The Plotters) - 2010
- 잽 (Jab) - 2013
- 뜨거운 피 (Hot Blood) - 2016

=== Works in Translation ===
This list is incomplete.

- Les planificateurs (French)
- The Plotters (English, translated by Sora Kim-Russell)
- Short story in AZALEA- Journal of Korean Literature & Culture: Vol. 4 (English)
- The Cabinet (English, translated by Sean Lin Halbert)
- Den rätta tiden för en kula i hjärtat (The Plotters) translated into Swedish by Lars Vargö, published by Southside Stories

== Awards ==
- 2006 Munhakdongne Novel Award, for 캐비닛 (The Cabinet)
- 2017 Hahn Moo-Sook Literary Prize, for 뜨거운 피 (Hot Blood)
