= The Hole (Pyun novel) =

2016 novel by Pyun Hye-Young

- Cover art for the Korean edition of the novel
- Author: Pyun Hye-young
- Translator: Sora Kim-Russell
- Language: Korean
- Genre: Thriller
- Set in: South Korea
- Published: 23 March 2016
- Publisher: Moonji Publishing Company (Korean), Arcade Publishing (English)
- Publication place: South Korea
- English publication date: 1 August 2017
- Awards: 2017 Shirley Jackson Award for Best Novel

The Hole (Korean: 홀) is a 2016 Korean novel by Pyun Hye-young. In 2017, it was translated into English by Sora Kim-Russell. The novel won the 2017 Shirley Jackson Award for Best Novel.

== Plot ==
Oghi, a South Korean professor, causes a car accident that kills his wife. The accident leaves him paralyzed and disfigured. He awakens from a coma; his only method of communication is blinking his eyes. Oghi's mother-in-law becomes his caretaker.

Oghi is confined to his home, with his mother-in-law and an aide as his only regular contact with the outside world. Oghi's mother-in-law begins spending money on a pastor to pray for Oghi; this angers him, but he is unable to communicate his feelings.

Oghi's aide is fired for theft, shrinking his world even further. He attempts to call his mistress; even though he can't speak, he wishes to hear her voice. Oghi's mother-in-law discovers the call and learns that Oghi was having an affair. She retreats to the office. Oghi worries that she will find her daughter's private notes, which include details about Oghi's unhappy marriage.

Oghi's mother-in-law begins caring for the garden, which was formerly managed by her deceased daughter. Oghi is able to watch from his window as she digs a large hole in the center of the yard.

Oghi's graduate school friends, identified only by their initials, visit him. His mother-in-law makes inappropriate jokes, stating that being a widower means that you can sleep with other women and it won't be considered cheating. She further humiliates him by changing his catheter bag in front of his friends. The narrative implies that his friend J was his mistress.

After his friends leave, Oghi's mother-in-law further isolates him by postponing his surgery. She claims that his surgeon has been in a minor car accident, but Oghi does not know if this is true. She also fires his private physical therapist.

Oghi reflects on the night of the car accident. His wife had confronted him about the affair with J and suggested a divorce. The narrative also reveals that Oghi once slept with his student, which ended his affair with J. Oghi's wife threatened to mail a letter detailing his personal failures to his boss and work colleagues. Oghi and his wife fought, and this distraction lead to the accident. Oghi cannot be sure if his wife was trying to crash the car or stop an impending accident.

Oghi gains some strength in his arms, but his situation grows more dire. He pulls himself from the bed, hoping to get help outside the house. He painstakingly makes his way outside, but is caught by his mother-in-law. She forces him into the hole in the garden. As he lies in the hole that will become his grave, he thinks of his wife and begins to cry.

== Publication history ==
The Hole is Pyun's first novel translated into English.

== Adaptations ==
In 2025, Orion Pictures acquired distribution rights to the film version of the novel. Kim Jee-Woon directs the film, which stars Theo James as an American living abroad in South Korea. After his wife is killed in a car accident, James's character is cared for by his Korean mother-in-law.

== Reception and awards ==
Writing for International Examiner, Katie Saibara wrote that the novel explores the question of what it means to be truly alone. Saibara wrote that as the story progresses, the reader gains new insights into the characters of both Oghi and his mother-in-law. This creates an atmosphere in which "the reader is never quite sure of who to trust and who to fear." Saibara stated that the titular hole was both literal and metaphorical, as Oghi finds himself isolated and imprisoned by the events of the story.

Krys Lee of World Literature Today wrote that the novel "is rooted in character but has the suspense of a thriller." According to Lee, the novel explores the concept of inequality which pervades Korean society, and industrialized nations more broadly. At the beginning of the story, Oghi is powerful; his situation changes drastically when he becomes disabled and is unable to care for himself. The review further commented on the physical and metaphorical holes in the novel, which range from Oghi's memory loss to the "cavity" left by his dead wife. Lee concludes that "The Hole is for readers who are unafraid of knowing that our life, and our loved ones, are strangers to us."

The novel won the 2017 Shirley Jackson Award for Best Novel.
