= Sora Kim-Russell =

Korean-American translator

Sora Kim-Russell (Korean: 김소라; born 1976) is a Korean American writer and translator from California, currently residing in Seoul. She received an MA in East Asian Studies from Stanford University and has translated a number of prominent Korean writers, including Hwang Sok-yong, Pyun Hye-young, and Jeon Sungtae. Her translations have appeared in outlets such as The New Yorker and Harper's Magazine. Among other accolades, her translation of Hwang Sok-young's At Dusk (해질무렵) was longlisted for the 2019 International Booker Prize.

== Biography ==
Kim-Russell is a biracial Korean-American. She began formally studying Korean in university and worked for a Korean studies journal in Seoul, editing translation. While working as an editor, she entered The Korea Times' literature translation contest in 2005 and won for poetry, and won the Literature Translation Institute of Korea (LTI Korea) contest for new translators in 2007. As a translator, she has taught literary translation courses at Ewha Womans University's Graduate School of Translation and Interpretation, LTI Korea, and the Bread Loaf Writers' Conference, and served as a mentor for the ALTA Emerging Translator Mentorship Program. She is a member of the translation collective Smoking Tigers, whose name is derived from the stock phrase of Korean folktales 호랑이 담배 피우던 시절에 (Long, long ago, back when tigers used to smoke tobacco), for Korean-to-English translators, which includes authors and translators such as Sung Ryu, Stella Kim, Soje, and Deborah Smith.

Kim-Russell has often commented on challenges in Korean translation, namely of certain untranslatable words and concepts in Korea, such as han, dapdaphada (a physical sensation of suffocation caused by feeling frustrated or unable to speak or act freely), and eogulhada (to feel that something is unfair or undeserved), and a perception of 'vagueness' in Korean writing because of the relatively sparse nature of Korean compared to English as a topic-prominent language with minimal pronouns. Her essays on topics including mixed-race Koreans, LGBTQ representation in Korean film, and North Korea have been published by a variety of publications.

== Translations ==
- Bae, Suah (2015), Nowhere to Be Found, Seattle: Amazon Crossing, ISBN 9781477827550
- Bae, Yong-joon (2010), A Journey in Search of Korea's Beauty, Seoul: Hollym, ISBN 9781565913073
- Gong, Ji-young (2014), Our Happy Time, New York: Marble Arch Press, ISBN 9781476730455
- Hwang, Sok-yong (2015), Princess Bari, Periscope, ISBN 9781859641743
- Hwang, Sok-yong (2017), At Dusk, Melbourne: Scribe, ISBN 9781947534667
- Hwang, Sok-yong (2017), Familiar Things, Victoria, Australia: Scribe, ISBN 9781947534049
- Hwang, Sok-yong (2021), The Prisoner, New York: Verso, ISBN 9781839760839
- Hwang, Sok-yong (2023), Mater 2-10, translated by Kim-Russell, Sora; Bae, Youngjae Josephine, Melbourne: Scribe, ISBN 9781922586940
- Jeon, Sungtae (2017), Wolves, Buffalo, New York: White Pine Press, ISBN 9781945680014
- Jeon, Sungtae (2019), Old Wrestler, Norwich: Strangers Press, ISBN 9781911343592
- Kim, Bo-young (2021), On the Origin of Species and Other Stories, Los Angeles: Kaya Press, ISBN 9781885030719
- Kim, Un-su (2019), The Plotters, New York: Anchor Books, ISBN 9780525564805
- Pyun, Hye-young (2018), The Hole, New York: Arcade Publishing, ISBN 9781628729917
- Pyun, Hye-young (2020), City of Ash and Red, New York: Arcade Publishing, ISBN 9781950691098
- Pyun, Hye-young (2020), The Law of Lines, New York: Arcade Publishing, ISBN 9781948924962
- Shin, Kyung-sook (2013), I'll Be Right There, New York: Other Press, ISBN 9781590516737

== Awards and nominations ==
- 2016: Nominated for PEN Translation Prize for Nowhere to Be Found by Bae Suah
- 2016: Nominated for Best Translated Book Award for Nowhere to Be Found by Bae Suah
- 2017: Winner of 2017 Shirley Jackson Award for The Hole by Pyun Hye-Young
- 2018: Winner of 2018 GKL Korean Literature Translation Awards for The Plotteres by Kim Un-su
- 2019: Longlisted for 2019 International Booker Prize for At Dusk by Hwang Sok-yong
- 2019: Winner of 2019 LTI Korea Translation Award for The Plotters by Kim Un-su
- 2020: Longlisted for 2020 PEN Translation Prize for At Dusk by Hwang Sok-yong
- 2021: Longlisted for 2021 National Book Award for Translated Literature for On the Origin of Species and Other Species by Kim Bo-young, translated with Joungmin Lee Comfort
- 2024: Shortlisted for 2024 International Booker Prize with Youngjae Josephine Bae for Mater 2-10 by Hwang Sok-yong
