= Chinese Australians =

Australians of Chinese ancestry

Total population
- 1,390,637 by ancestry (2021 census) (5.5% of the Australian population); 677,240 born in mainland China (2019); 101,290 born in Hong Kong (2019); 59,250 born in Taiwan (2019); 3,130 born in Macau (2019)

Regions with significant populations
- Sydney, Melbourne, Brisbane, Perth, Adelaide, Canberra, other urban areas Christmas Island

Languages
- Australian English; Mandarin Chinese; Cantonese; Various other Chinese dialects Malay

Religion
- Irreligion, Christianity, Buddhism, Chinese folk religion, Taoism, Confucianism

Related ethnic groups
- Hong Kong Australians, Taiwanese Australians, Malaysian Australians, Singaporean Australians, Overseas Chinese

Chinese Australians
- Simplified Chinese: 华裔澳洲人
- Traditional Chinese: 華裔澳洲人
Transcriptions
Standard Mandarin
- Hanyu Pinyin: Huáyì àozhōurén
Yue: Cantonese
- Jyutping: wa^{4} yeui^{6} ou^{3} jau^{1} jan^{4}

Alternative Chinese name
- Simplified Chinese: 澳大利亚华人
- Traditional Chinese: 澳大利亞華人
Transcriptions
Standard Mandarin
- Hanyu Pinyin: Àodàlìyǎ huárén

Chinese Australians are Australians of Chinese origin. Chinese Australians are one of the largest groups within the global Chinese diaspora, and are the largest Asian Australian community. Per capita, Australia has more people of Chinese ancestry than any country outside Asia. As a whole, Australian residents identifying themselves as having Chinese ancestry made up 5.5% of Australia's population at the 2021 census.

The early history of Chinese Australians began with significant immigration from the Pearl River Delta villages in South China, with most immigrants speaking Yue dialects. In the 19th century, the gold rushes lured large numbers of Chinese to the Australian colonies. Similar to overseas Chinese communities worldwide, these early immigrants established Chinatowns in major cities, including Adelaide, Brisbane, Melbourne, Perth, and Sydney. Today, Australians of full or partial Chinese origin form the plurality of the population in the Australian external territory of Christmas Island.

== History ==
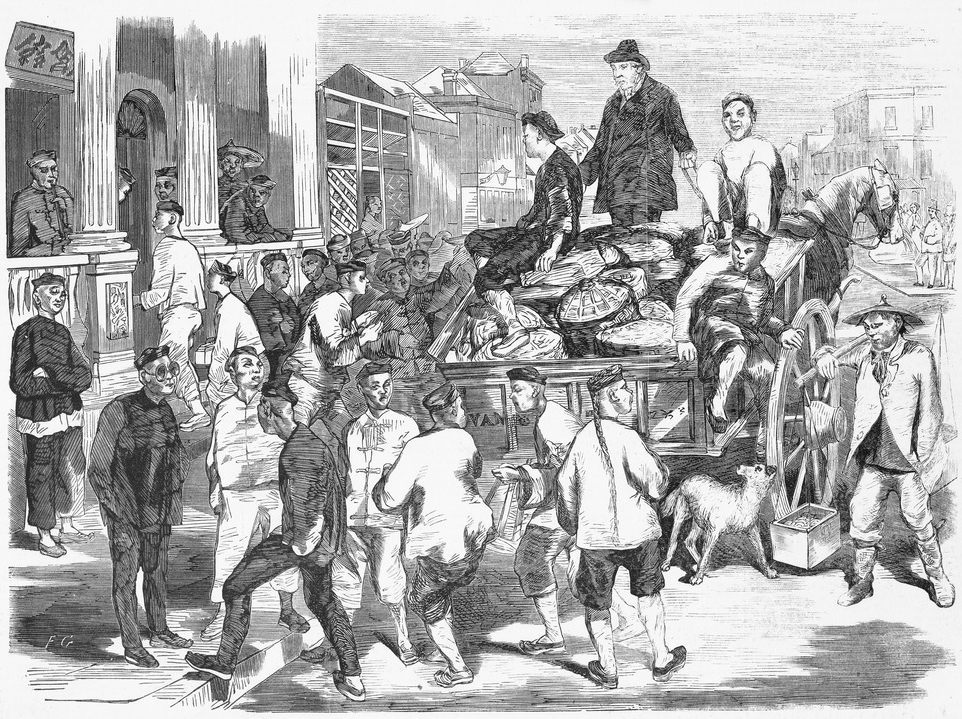
Chinese immigrants arriving in Chinatown, Melbourne, 1866

Chinese peoples have a long and continuing role in Australian history. There were early links between China and Australia when Macau and Canton were used as an important trading ports with the fledgling colony. Mak Sai Ying (also known as John Shying) was the first officially recorded Chinese migrant in 1818. After his arrival he spent some time farming before, in 1829, he became prominent as the publican of The Lion in Parramatta. Early-19th-century migration was in limited numbers and sporadic, primarily those who came in this period were free merchants or adventurers and, the more common, indentured labourers.

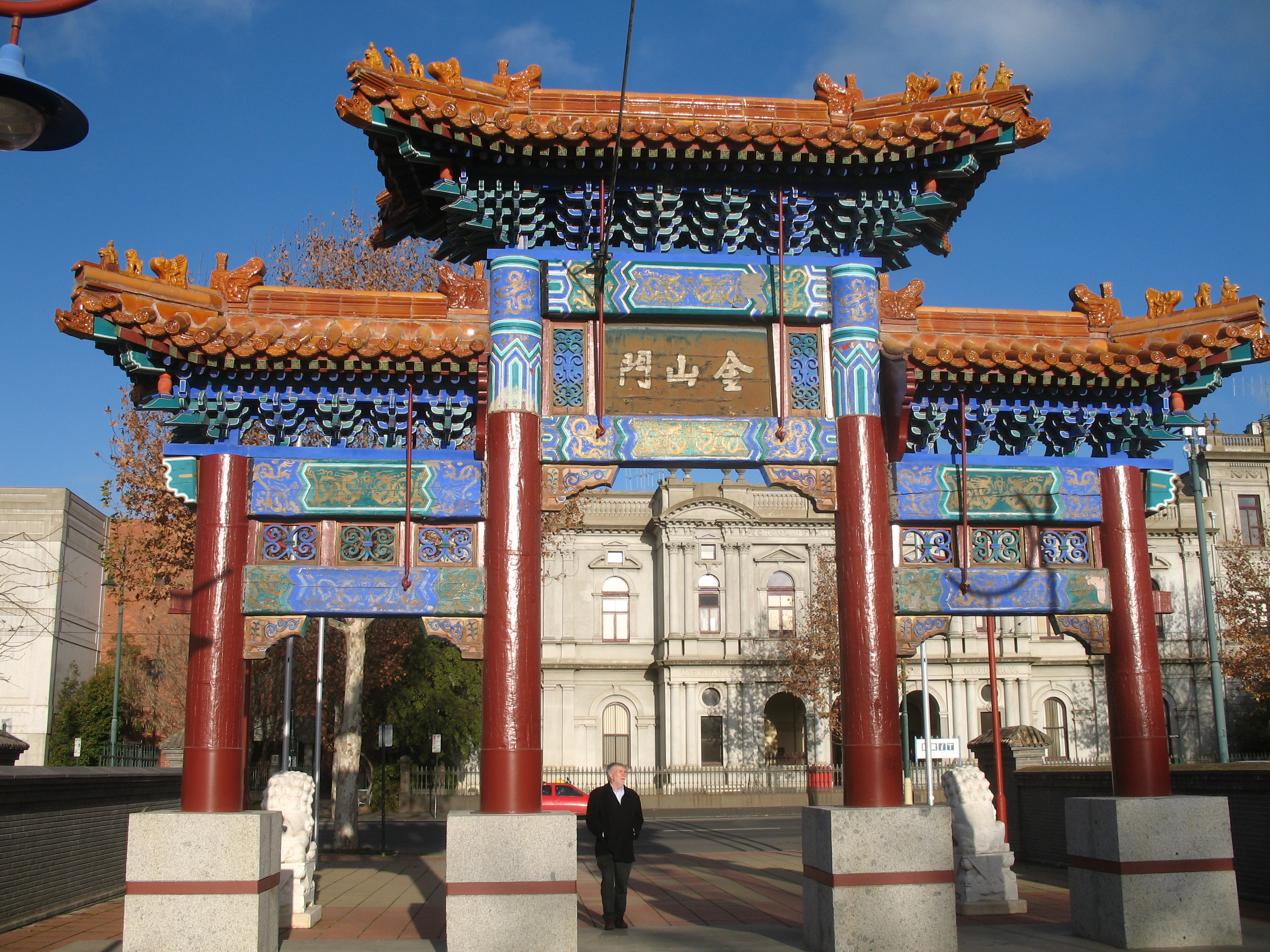
Gate to Bendigo's Golden Dragon Museum, dedicated to the history of the Chinese on the Victorian goldfields

The Australian Gold Rushes are what first lured thousands of Chinese to the country. In 1855 in Melbourne there were 11,493 Chinese arrivals. This was startling considering that barely five years previous, Melbourne's entire population had only been around 25,000 people. By 1858, 42,000 Chinese immigrants had arrived in Victoria, with many of them living in boarding houses in Little Bourke Street. Due to the widespread racist sentiments in parliament and on the goldfields, the first of many immigration restrictions and Chinese targeting laws was passed in late 1855. However, due to the long, poorly regulated borders between the colonies of Australia the numbers of Chinese on the goldfields continued to swell. Upon the goldfields Chinese peoples faced many hardships. There were violent anti-Chinese riots; the Buckland Riot, the Lambing Flats Riots, as well as general discrimination and prejudice. However, there were many establishments in this period that would have a lasting effect on the history of Australia and the history of Chinese in Australia. One of these establishments were the Chinese camps, which most often, later, became Chinatowns in Australia. There was also the establishment and the consolidation of power for Chinese societies, many of these are still active in Australia today. These societies provided support and community for the Chinese in the colonies.

After the gold rushes the numbers of Chinese living in the cities swelled and their businesses and industries contributed much to growth of Melbourne and Sydney in the late 19th century. Mei Quong Tart and Lowe Kong Meng were prominent business figures in Sydney and Melbourne respectively. However, there were very few Chinese women migrating to Australia. At one point in the 1860s the numbers of Chinese in Australia was around 40,000. Of these, it is believed only 12, were women. This gender imbalance meant that Chinese men married women of European descent but many had it in their hearts to return to China.

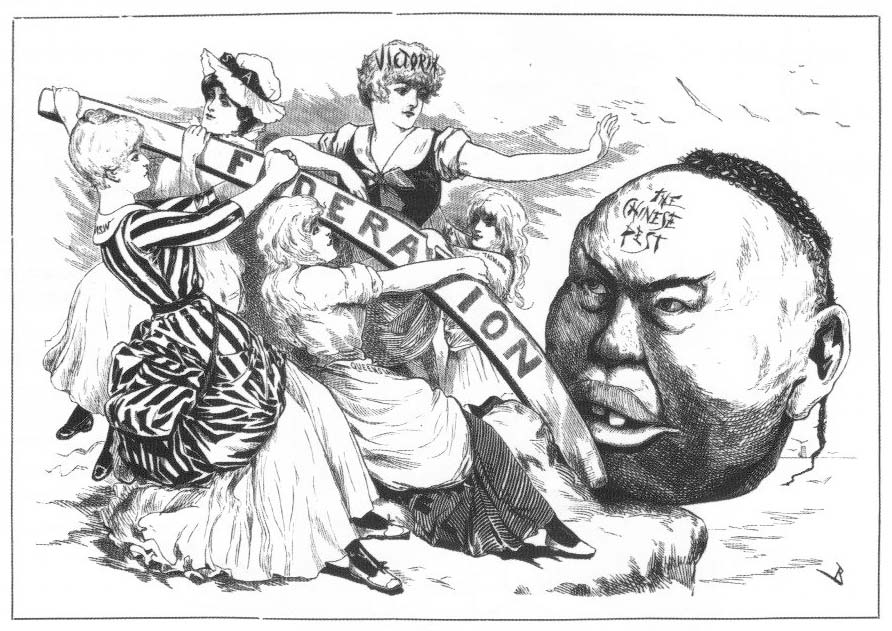
This 1888 political cartoon by the Melbourne Punch depicts the anti-Chinese racism in Australia which was one of the driving forces behind the push for federation.

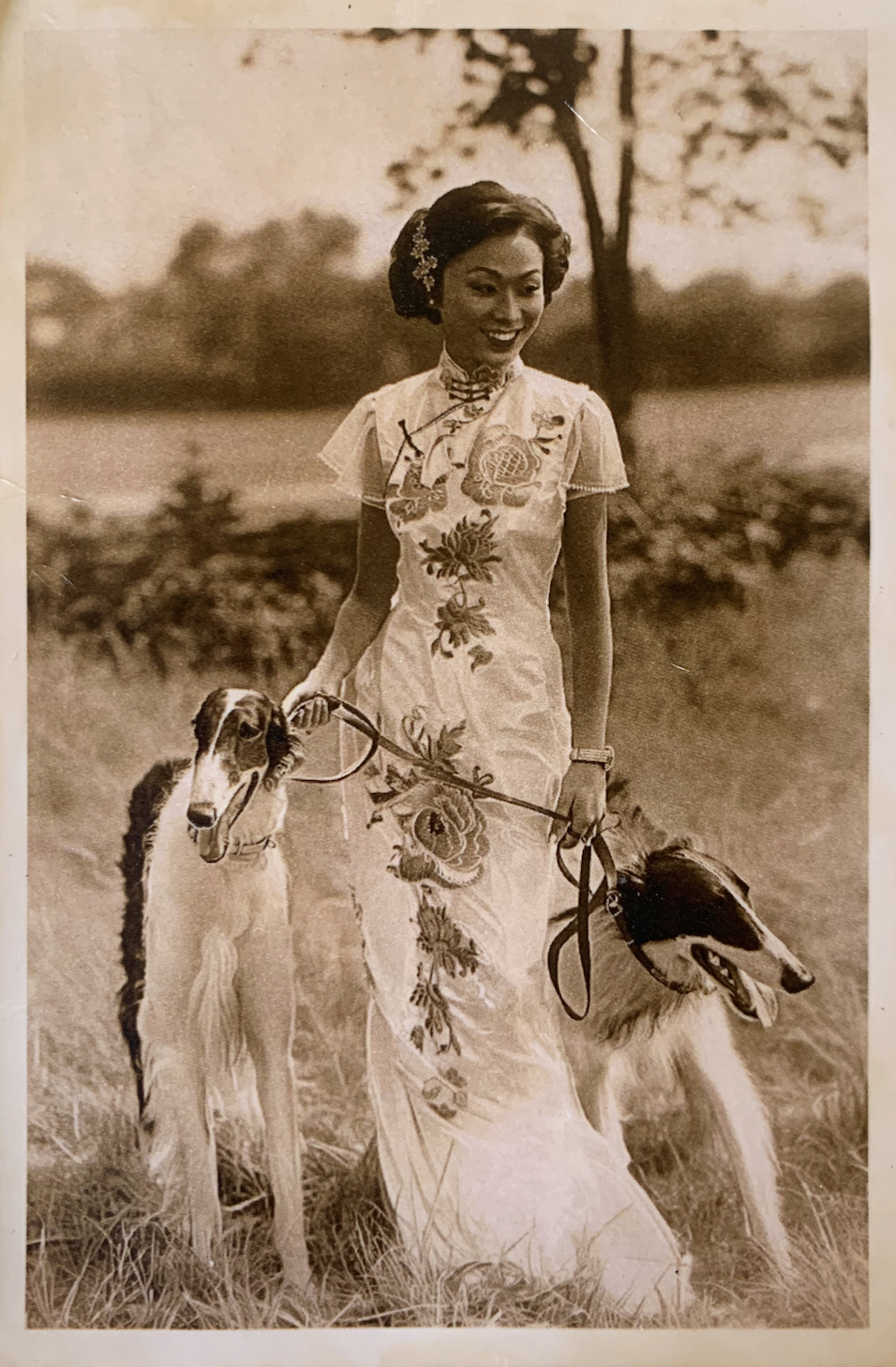
A Chinese Australian woman wearing traditional qipao standing in the bushland with two borzoi dogs in the bushland of Bendigo, Victoria, Australia, 1930s

Anti-Chinese racism among white Australians also strongly contributed to the push for the federation of Australia. Some of the first Acts of the new federation would establish the White Australia Policy. This policy made it almost impossible for anyone new to migrate from China to Australia. After federation the population of Chinese in Australia steadily declined. Despite the declining numbers people with Chinese heritage still played their part in Australian history. There were over 200 people with Chinese heritage who fought for Australia in World War I, including the decorated sniper Billy Sing. A similar number fought for Australia in World War II.

Following the end of the White Australia Policy in the 1960s, Australia welcomed new groups from the Chinese diaspora, including many people from non-Cantonese-speaking regions. In the 1970s, the first major wave brought ethnic Chinese refugees from Vietnam and Cambodia. During the 1980s and 1990s, economic immigrants arrived from Hong Kong and Taiwan as well as some Chinese Peruvians—following a 1968 military dictatorship there—with families mostly settling in major capital cities. To support these growing populations, communities built fresh organizations, revived groups like the Chinese Chamber of Commerce, and started publishing Chinese-language newspapers again.

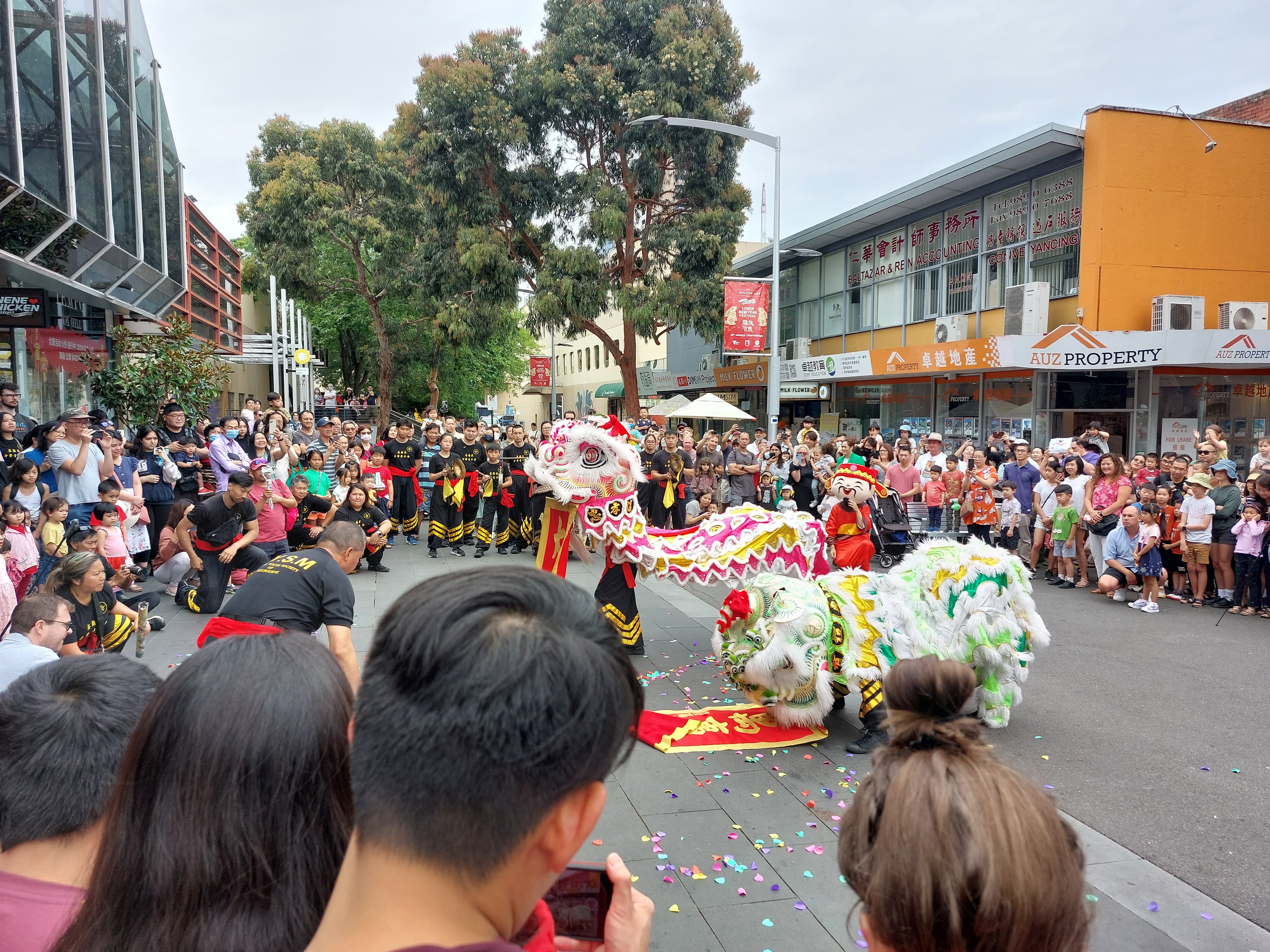
Chinese New Year celebrations at Box Hill, Victoria, home to one of the largest Chinese Australian communities in the country

After the 1989 Tiananmen Square protests, then-Australian Prime Minister, Bob Hawke, allowed students from China to settle in Australia permanently. The aftermath of May 1998 riots of Indonesia saw sizeable influx of Chinese Indonesians fleeing persecution in their home country for Australia. Since the 2000s, with the rapid development of China's economy, there has been an explosion in the number of immigrants from China, which have frequently been Australia's largest source of new immigrants since 2000. In 2015–16, China (excluding Hong Kong and Macau) was the second largest source of immigrants to Australia behind India. China (excluding Hong Kong, Macau and Taiwan) is now the third largest foreign birthplace for Australian residents, after England and New Zealand.

== Demographics ==
Population with Chinese ancestry by census year (including annualised growth rate)
| Year | Pop. | ±% p.a. |
|---|---|---|
| 1986 | 201,331 | — |
| 2001 | 556,554 | +7.01% |
| 2006 | 669,896 | +3.78% |
| 2011 | 866,205 | +5.27% |
| 2016 | 1,213,903 | +6.98% |
| 2021 | 1,390,637 | +2.76% |

At the 2021 census, 1,390,637 Australian residents identified themselves as having Chinese ancestry, accounting for 5.5% of the total population.

In 2019, the Australian Bureau of Statistics estimated that there were 677,240 Australian residents born in mainland China, 101,290 born in Hong Kong, 59,250 born in Taiwan and 3,130 born in Macau. There are also a large number of persons of Chinese ancestry among those born in Southeast Asian countries such as Malaysia, Indonesia, Singapore, the Philippines and Vietnam.

Before the end of the 20th century, Chinese Australians were predominately of Cantonese and Hakka descent from mainland China, Hong Kong and Macau, and Cantonese was the dominant language. Due to more recent immigration from other regions of China, Mandarin has surpassed Cantonese by number of speakers.

In a 2004 study on the intermarriage pattern in Australia, the proportion of second-generation Chinese Australians with spouses of Anglo-Celtic ancestry was approximately 21% and for third generation it was 68%.

According to Australian Bureau of Statistics, in 2012 Chinese immigrant mothers had a total fertility of 1.59 children per woman, lower compared to the Australian average of 1.94. This declined to 1.19 and 1.73 respectively in 2019.

| Capital city | Population with Chinese ancestry (2021 census) | Proportion of total population |
|---|---|---|
| Sydney | 552,680 | 10.6% |
| Melbourne | 409,285 | 8.3% |
| Brisbane | 117,496 | 4.7% |
| Perth | 112,293 | 5.3% |
| Adelaide | 56,788 | 4.1% |
| Canberra | 26,031 | 5.7% |

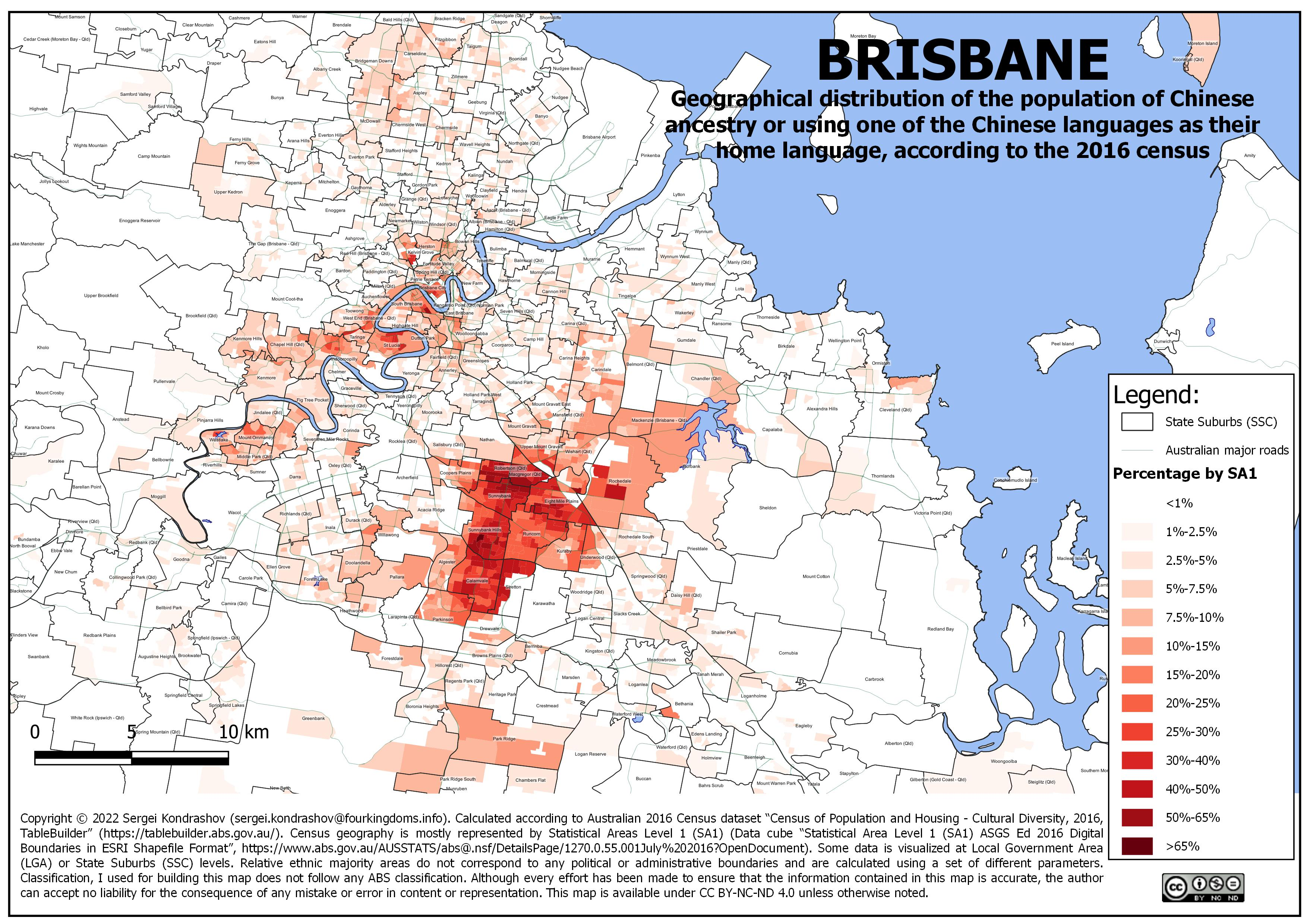
Brisbane population of Chinese ancestry.

=== Language ===
At the 2021 census, 685,274 persons declared that they spoke Mandarin at home (the most common language spoken at home in Australia after English at 2.8%), followed by Cantonese at 295,281 (the fourth most common after English at 1.2%). Many Chinese Australians speak other varieties of Chinese such as Shanghainese, Hokkien and Hakka at home. Many Chinese Australians from other areas speak Tagalog (Philippines), Malay (Malaysia, Singapore, and Brunei), Vietnamese, Thai, and Portuguese (Macau) as additional languages. Second or higher generation Chinese Australians are often either monolingual in English or bilingual to varying degrees with their heritage language, with their relationship to language often being a key component in the maintenance of a bicultural identity.

Chinese Australians have adopted many slang terms in Chinese. An example is the term 土澳, which is a slang term for Australia (as opposed to the standard term, 澳大利亞).

=== Religion ===
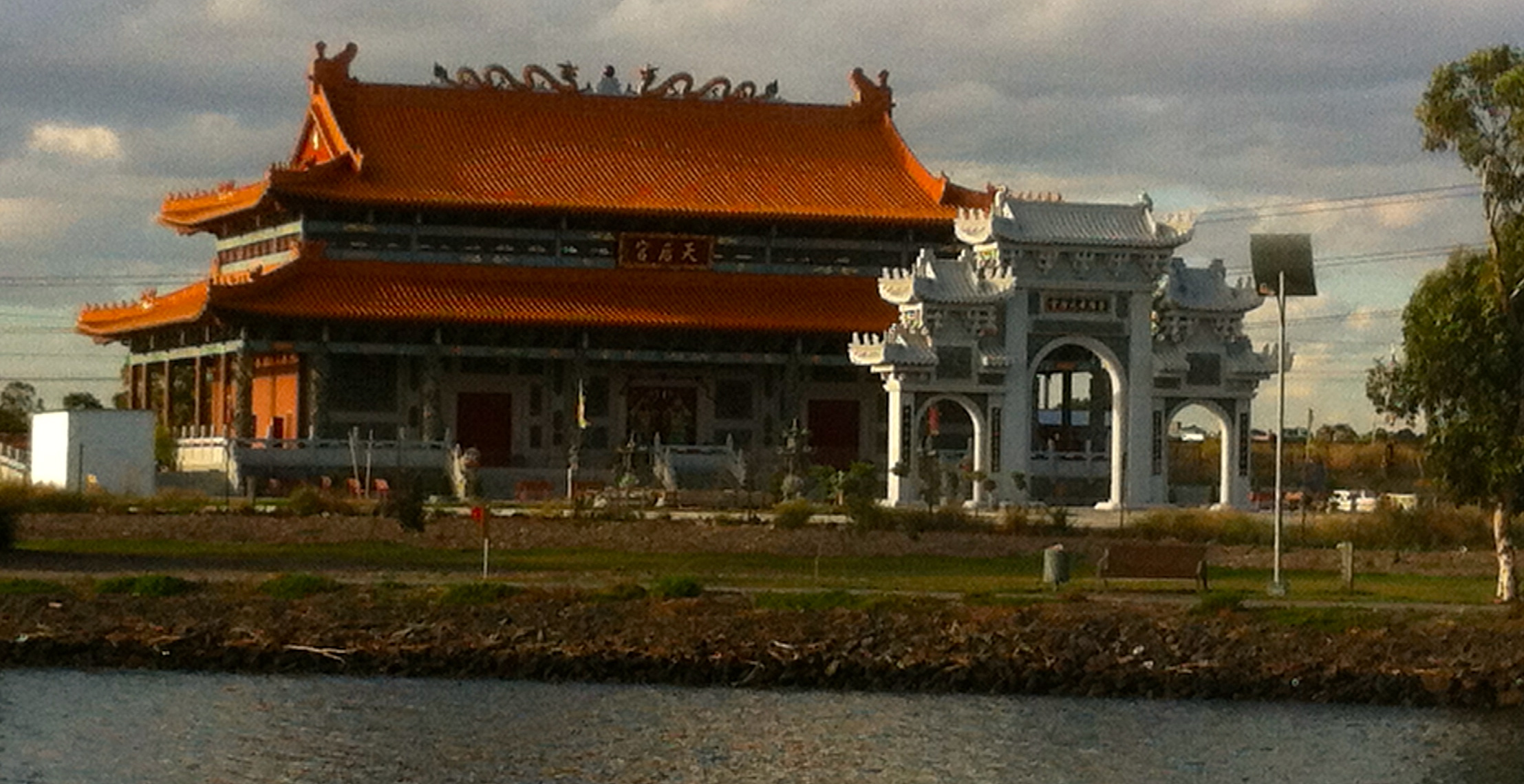
The Heavenly Queen Temple in Footscray, Victoria is Australia's largest temple of the Chinese folk religion.

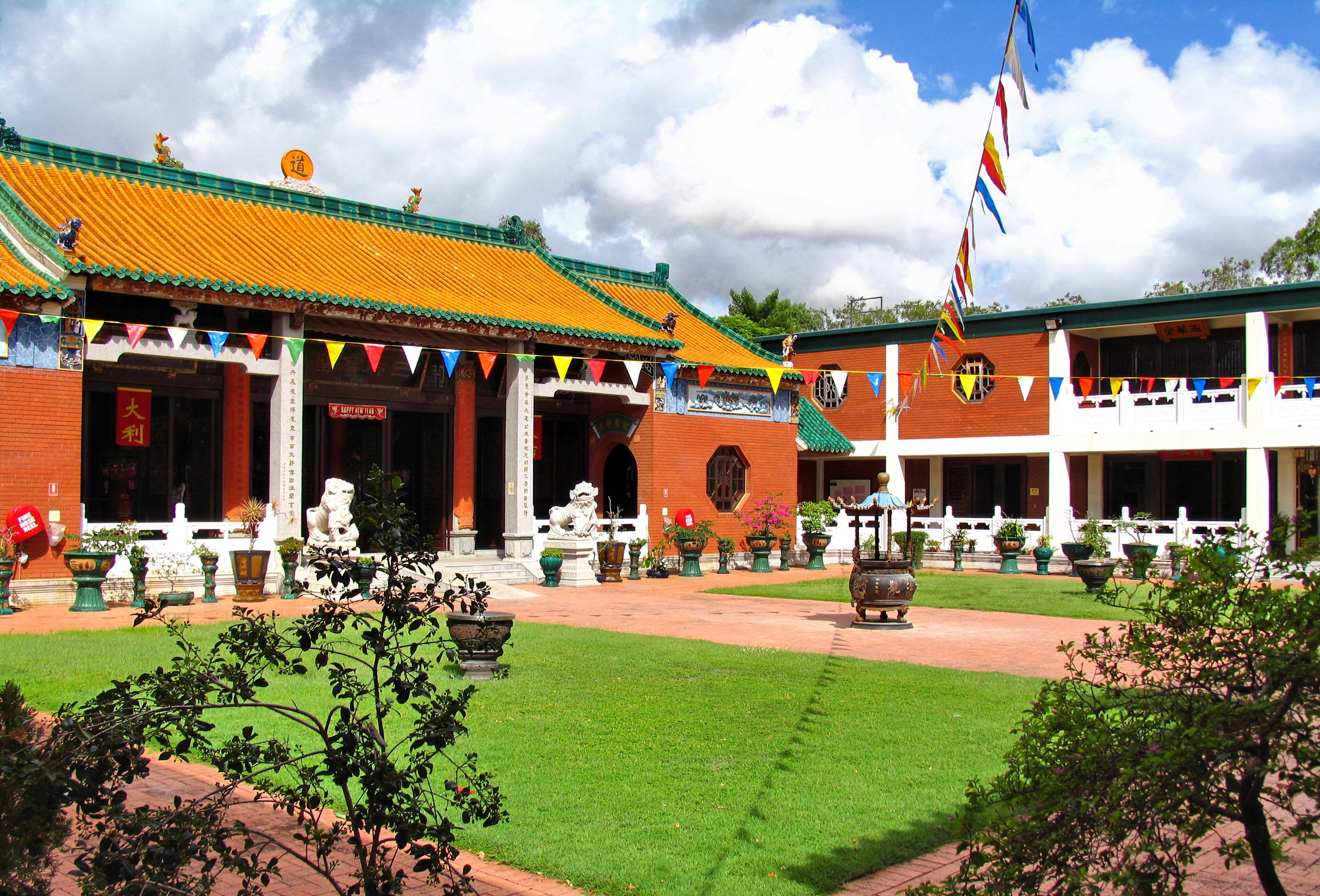
Internal courtyard of the Green Pine Taoist Temple in Deagon, Brisbane, belonging to the Evergreen Taoist Church.

According to the census data collected in the last twenty years, among Australians with full or partial Chinese ancestry there has been a general decline of institutional religions (between 2006 and 2016, Buddhism fell from 24.1% to 15.7% and Christianity fell from 29.8% to 23.4%). In 2016, 55.4% of the Chinese Australians fit within the census category of "not religious, secular beliefs or other spiritual beliefs", rising significantly from 37.8% in 2006. These shiftings in religious demography may be due to the incoming of new immigrants from China who generally do not have a formal religious affiliation, and many of whom are involved in the native Chinese religion (including Chinese ancestral worship) which has been experiencing a revival in China over the last decades.

There are also several notable Chinese temples that exist and still active in Australia, like Sarm Sung Goon Temple, Albion (built in 1886), Sze Yup Temple (built in 1898), Yiu Ming Temple (built in 1908) and Heavenly Queen Temple (Melbourne). Nan Tien Temple in New South Wales and Chung Tian Temple in Queensland are the oversea branch temples of Fo Guang Shan.

Religion of Australians of full or partial Chinese ancestry, by census
| Religion | 2006 | | 2011 | | 2016 | |
| Religion | Number | % | Number | % | Number | % |
|---|---|---|---|---|---|---|
| Not religious or Chinese religion | 238,678 | 37.8 | 359,139 | 43.7 | 633,056 | 55.4 |
| Christianity | 188,111 | 29.8 | 233,070 | 28.4 | 267,256 | 23.4 |
| Buddhism | 152,544 | 24.1 | 177,902 | 21.6 | 179,384 | 15.7 |
| Islam | 1,466 | 0.23 | 2,280 | 0.27 | 3,120 | 0.27 |
| Hinduism | 212 | 0.03 | 301 | 0.03 | 828 | 0.07 |
| Judaism | 139 | 0.02 | 170 | 0.02 | 219 | 0.02 |
| Other | 2,433 | 0.38 | 3,249 | 0.4 | 4,330 | 0.37 |
| Unclear | 2,375 | 0.37 | 3,423 | 0.4 | 2,883 | 0.25 |
| Unanswered | 44,643 | 7.0 | 41,074 | 5.0 | 50,364 | 4.4 |
| Total population | 630,598 | 100.0 | 820,613 | 100.0 | 1,141,440 | 100.0 |

=== Politics ===
Historically, Chinese Australians have voted for the Coalition over Labor, due to a perception that the Liberal Party was more business-oriented and more focused on economic development than Labor. However, support for the Coalition from Chinese Australians has declined in recent years.

In the 2022 Australian federal election, electorates with a higher concentration of Chinese-Australian voters experienced larger swings against the Coalition compared to other electorates; in the top 15 seats by Chinese ancestry, the swing against the Coalition on a two-party-preferred basis was 6.6 per cent, compared to 3.7 per cent in other seats. This resulted in the Liberal Party losing many federal seats with large Chinese communities in 2022 to Labor (losing Bennelong and Reid in Sydney and Chisholm in Melbourne to Labor and Kooyong in Melbourne to a teal independent), as well as losing Aston in 2023, which was the first time in over a century in which the government won a seat off the opposition in a by-election.

In the 2023 New South Wales state election, the top 10 electorates in terms of Chinese ancestry all saw big swings to Labor. The marked swings from the Coalition to Labor from 2022 onwards has been attributed to Australia's fraught relationship with China under the Morrison government, which was marked with aggressive and hostile rhetoric against China from senior politicians such as Scott Morrison and Peter Dutton.

The federal electorate with the highest number of Chinese Australians is the Division of Chisholm in Melbourne, which has been held by the Labor Party since 2022.

Federal opinion polling among Chinese Australians
| Year | Liberal | Labor | Greens | One Nation | Other |
|---|---|---|---|---|---|
| 2021 | 42% | 21% | —N/a | | |
| 2022 | 28% | 25% | —N/a | | |
| 2025 | 34% | 48% | 11% | 1% | 6% |
| 2026 | 34% | 46% | 9% | 5% | 5% |

== Socioeconomics ==
=== Education ===
In 2006, 55.0 percent for Chinese-born Australians aged 15 years and over had some form of higher non-school qualifications compared to 52.5 percent of the Australian population. Among Chinese-born Australians, 42.2 percent had Diploma level or higher* qualifications and 4.8 percent had Certificate level qualifications. For Chinese-born Australians, 88,440 had no higher non-school qualification, of which 35.3 percent were still attending an educational institution. In 2006, 57.3 per cent of the Hong Kong-born Australians aged 15 years and over had some form of higher non-school qualifications compared to 52.5 percent of the Australian population. Among the Hong Kong-born Australians, 45.7 per cent had Diploma level or higher qualifications and 6.1 percent had Certificate level qualifications. From the Hong Kong-born Australians, 28,720 had no higher non-school qualification, of which 44.7 per cent were still attending an educational institution.

In 2006, 31.9% of Chinese Australians attained a bachelor's degree compared to just 14.8% for the general Australian population. 36.1% of Hong Kong Australians attained a bachelor's degree or higher. Chinese Australians born overseas reported high educational attainment with over 50% of them holding at least bachelor's degree. When all these rates are melded, approximately 42 percent of (first and second generation) Chinese Australians have achieved a bachelor's degree, making it roughly three times the national average of 14 percent.

The pathways Chinese-Australian families choose to motivate their children is partly based on their cultural values which emphasise scholastic excellence, and partly on their own experiences in their native as well as in the host country. Customarily, activities taking place in Chinese-Australian homes were related to the education of their children. Regular family discussions on educational matters and career paths had a modelling effect. The key feature of these families was that parental involvement in their children's school-related activities remained high throughout the high school time of their children. Chinese-Australian families indicated that diligence, a deep cultural respect for education and motivation to become educated was quite strong among first generation immigrants. Chinese-Australians have a significant influence and place considerable pressure on their children academically. In addition, mathematics achievement and participation of high school students have a strong correlation towards the success or achievement goals and sense of competence. In addition, Chinese students from migrant backgrounds, in comparison to those from refugee backgrounds, are more academically successful.

=== Employment ===
Among Hong Kong-born Australians aged 15 years and over, the participation rate in the labour force was 63.3 percent and the unemployment rate was 6.6 percent. The corresponding rates in the total Australian population were 64.6 and 5.2 percent respectively. Of the 39,870 Hong Kong-born Australians who were employed, 42.2 percent were employed in a Skill Level 1 occupation, 12.3 percent in Skill Level 2 and 8.5 percent in Skill Level 3. The corresponding rates in the total Australian population were 28.7, 10.7 and 15.1 percent respectively.

Many Chinese Australians work in white collar middle class jobs. But Chinese Australians are under-represented in occupations such as journalism, law and other professions that require language skills and face to face contact. First-generation Chinese Australians also experience problems in getting white collar jobs commensurate with their qualifications and work experience. Instead, they go into business and operate convenience stores, car dealerships, grocery stores, coffee shops, news agencies and restaurants while making sacrifices to pay for their children's education. Perceiving education as the only available channel of social mobility, substantial investment in children's education at a disproportionate sacrifice to family finance and social well-being is an indication of parental concerns and expectations.

33.8% of Chinese Australians and 46.6% Hong Kong Australians work as white collar professionals compared to 32% for the total Australian population. 63.3% of Hong Kong Australians and 56.3% of Chinese Australians participate in the Australian workforce which was below the national average of 67.1%. Chinese Australians and Hong Kong Australians also have an unemployment rate of 11.2% and 6.6% respectively. Both figures were higher than the national average of 4.9%.

=== Economics ===
In 2006, the median individual weekly income for Chinese-born Australians aged 15 years and over was $242, compared with $431 for all overseas-born and $488 for all Australia-born. The total Australian population had a median individual weekly income of $466. In 2006, the median individual weekly income for Hong Kong-born Australians aged 15 years and over was $425, compared with $431 for all overseas-born and $488 for all Australia-born. The total Australian population had a median individual weekly income of $466. Therefore, median weekly earnings for Chinese Australians are relatively lower than the population average.

== Notable Chinese Australians ==
There have been numerous notable Chinese Australians in various fields throughout Australia's history.

== Chinese place names in Australia ==
Due to the long history of the Chinese in Australia, many places have Chinese names.

== See also ==
- History of Chinese Australians
- Chinatowns in Australia
- Chinatowns in Oceania
- Asian Australians
- Australians in China
- White Australia policy
- Buckland riot (1857)
- Lambing Flat riots (1860–1861)
- Australia–China relations
- Australia–Taiwan relations
