= Kim Bo-young =

South Korean writer (born 1975)

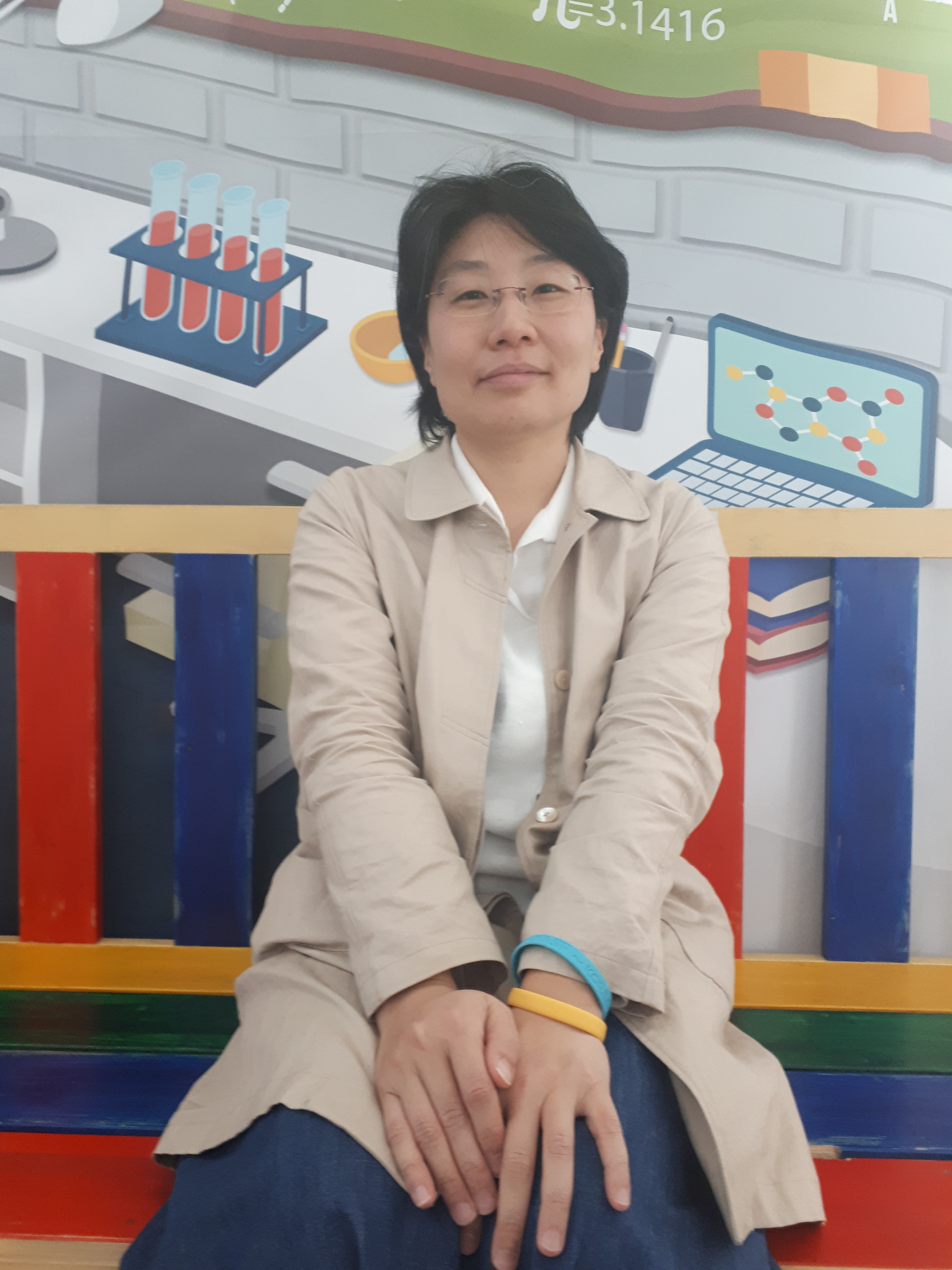
- Born: 1975 (age 50–51)
- Writing career
- Genre: Sci-fi

Kim Bo-young (Korean: 김보영; born 1975) is a South Korean science fiction writer based in Gangwon Province, South Korea. In addition to her novels and short story collections, she has worked as a script advisor for Bong Joon-ho's Snowpiercer in 2013. She is the first Korean science fiction author to be published by HarperCollins.

== Biography ==
Kim was born in 1975. Before her career as an author, she worked as a screenwriter, game developer, and graphic designer for the Korean computer game developer Garam & Baram.

In 2004, her first published work of fiction, The Experience of Touch, won the inaugural Korean Science & Technology Creative Writing Award. She went on to win the annual South Korean SF Novel Award three separate times for The Seven Executioners (2013) in the novel category, The World's Fastest Person (2014) in the short story/novella category, and How Alike We Are (2017) in the short story/novella category.

Kim's short stories are often rooted in or inspired by significant flashpoints in Korean society, such as the Sewol ferry disaster, and an incident informally dubbed 'Korean Gamergate' in which a voice actress for a prominent video game posted a photo of herself wearing a shirt with the words 'Girls Do Not Need a prince', which resulted in the actress losing her job.

Until recently, Kim was one of the few Korean science fiction authors to be translated into English, partially as a result of her short story publication in Clarkesworld Magazine. Kim's current works that have been translated into English are I'm Waiting for You (HarperVoyager, 2021, translated by Sophie Bowman and Sung Ryu), On the Origin of Species and Other Stories (Kaya Press, 2021), and A Plagued Sea (Tor Nightfire, 2026, translated by Sophie Bowman). On the Origin of Species and Other Stories, translated by Sora Kim-Russell and Joungmin Lee Comfort, was longlisted for the 2021 National Book Award for Translated Literature.

== Selected works ==
- An Evolutionary Myth (진화 신화), 2010
- The Seven Executioners (7인 의 집행관 : 김보영 장편 소설), 2013
- The Prophet of Mundanity (저 이승 의 선지자), 2017
- How Alike are we (얼마나 닮았는가 : 김보영 소설집), 2020
- I'm Waiting for You (당신을 기다리고 있어 : 김보영 장편 소설), 2020
