= Morses Creek riots =

1859 anti-Chinese riot in Victoria, Australia

Morses Creek riot
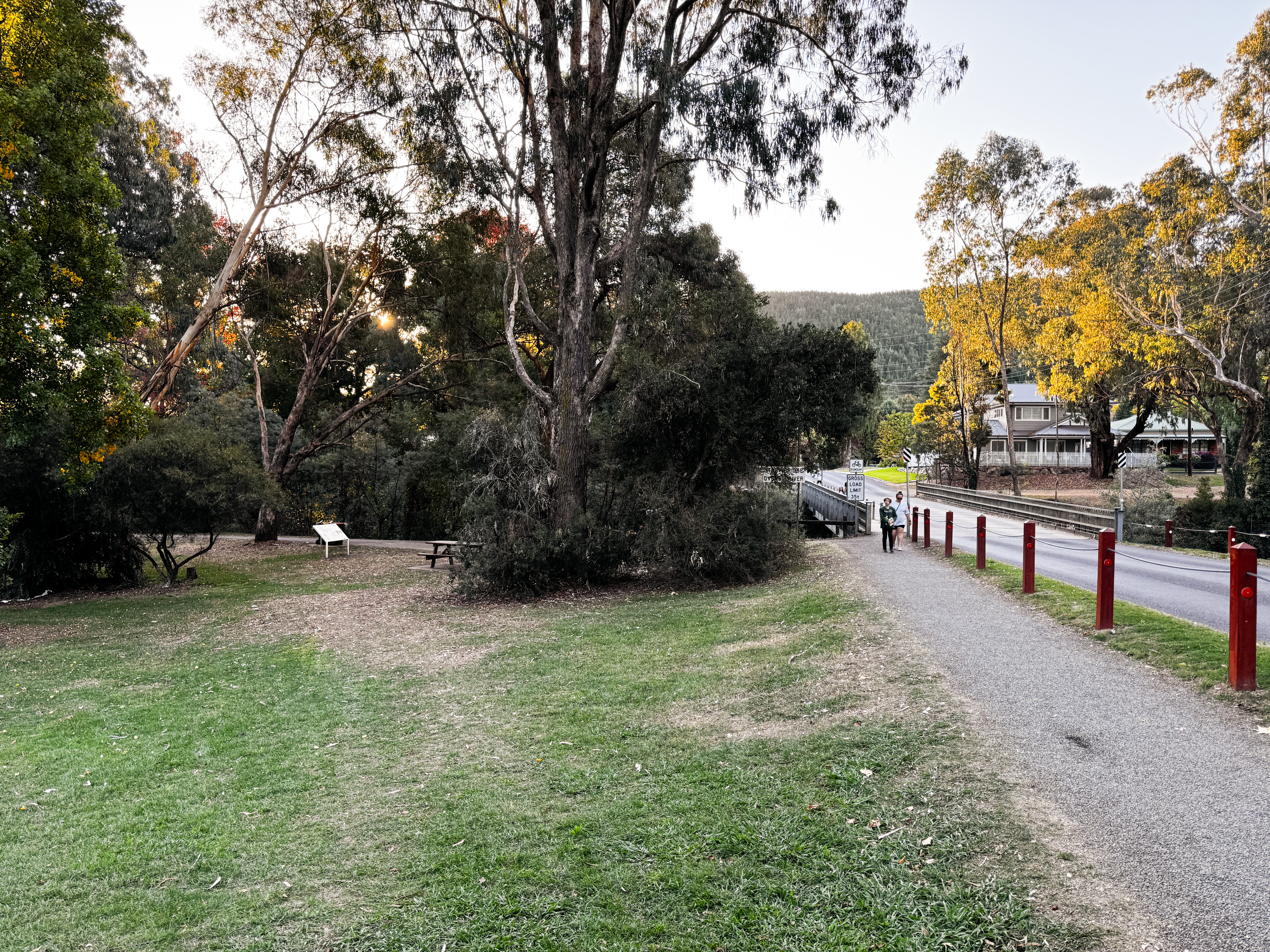
- Site of the Morses Creek riots on the bank of the Ovens River at Bright (photographed 2025)
- Date: late April 1859
- Location: Morses Creek (present‑day Bright), Colony of Victoria; 36.726581°S 146.958424°E
- Methods: Arson, assault
- Result: Chinese miners expelled; one death and several injuries reported

Parties
European miners	Chinese miners

Casualties and losses
None recorded	1 killed, several injured

The Morses Creek riots were violent anti-Chinese disturbances that took place on the goldfields at Morses Creek (now Bright) in the Colony of Victoria in late April 1859. The episode was part of a broader pattern of racial hostility toward Chinese miners during the Australian gold rushes, such as the Buckland riot of July 1857.

== Background ==
Chinese miners began working the Ovens goldfields in significant numbers from 1855. Their presence provoked resentment among some European diggers, who viewed the Chinese as economic competitors and culturally alien. Although extra police were deployed after the 1857 Buckland riot, tensions persisted.

== Incident ==
According to the Ovens Constitution, reprinted in The Argus on 29 April 1859, the attack began “shortly after sunset, before moon‑rise.” European miners set fire to tents in the Chinese camp near Anger's Hotel on the banks of Morses Creek. As the occupants fled the flames, they were forced to “run the gauntlet” between assailants armed with sticks and pick‑handles. One Chinese miner was killed, and several others suffered broken limbs and other serious injuries.

== Aftermath ==
Few of the perpetrators were ever brought to justice, a pattern repeated in subsequent anti‑Chinese disturbances such as the Lambing Flat riots (1860–1861).

== See also ==
- Buckland riot
- Lambing Flat riots
- Anti-Chinese sentiment in Australia
