= Bae Suah =

South Korean writer (born 1965)

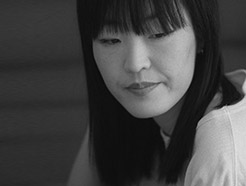
- Born: 1965 (age 60–61); Jung District, Seoul, South Korea
- Occupations: Author, translator
- Writing career
- Language: Korean, German
- Genre: Fiction

Signature
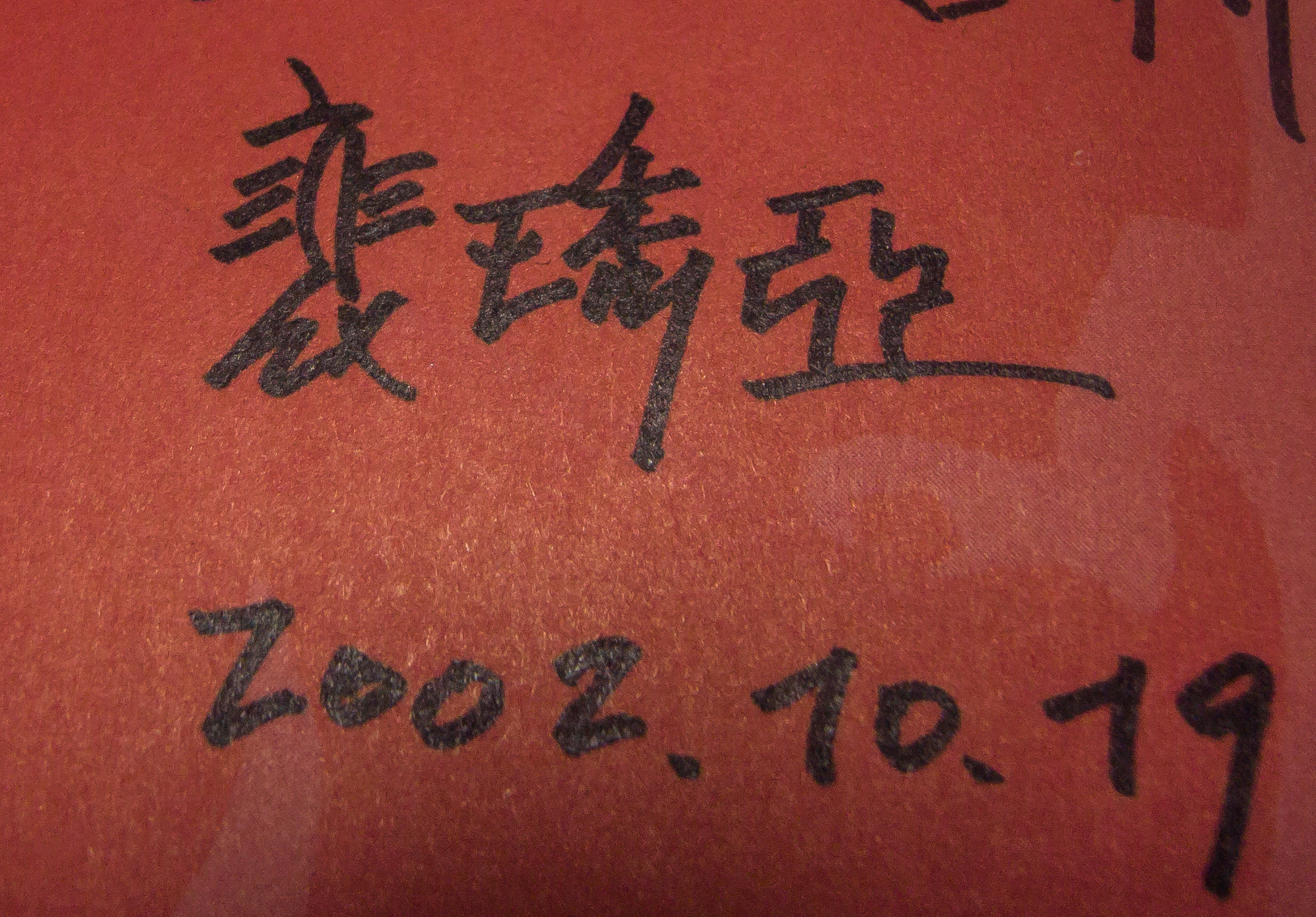

- Bae Suah
- Hangul: 배수아
- Hanja: 裵琇亞
- RR: Bae Sua
- MR: Pae Sua

Bae Suah (Korean: 배수아; born 1965) is a South Korean author and translator.

== Life ==
Bae graduated from Ewha Womans University with a degree in chemistry. At the time of her debut in 1993, she was a government employee working behind the embarkation/disembarkation desk at Gimpo Airport in Incheon. Without formal instruction or guidance from a literary mentor, Bae wrote stories as a hobby and eventually left her job to become a successful writer, known for her unconventional style.

She made her debut as a writer with "A Dark Room in 1988" in 1993. Bae stayed in Germany for 11 months between 2001 and 2002, where she began learning German.

She edits contents in literary magazine Axt since 2015.

== Work ==
Bae has departed from the tradition of mainstream literature and created her own literary world based on a unique style and knack for psychological description.

Bae made her debut as a writer with "A Dark Room" in 1993. Since then, she has published two anthologies of short fiction, including the novella Highway With Green Apples. She has also published novels, including Rhapsody in Blue. Her work is regarded as unconventional in the extreme, including such unusual topics as men becoming victims of domestic violence by their female spouses (in "Sunday at the Sukiyaki Restaurant"). characterized by tense-shifting and alterations in perspective. Her most recent works are nearly a-fictional, decrying characterization and plot.

Bae is known for her use of abrupt shifts in tense and perspective, sensitive yet straightforward expressions, and seemingly non sequitur sentences to unsettle and distance her readers. Bae's works offer neither the reassurance of moral conventions upheld, nor the consolation of adversities rendered meaningful. Most of her characters harbor traumatic memories from which they may never fully emerge, and their families, shown to be in various stages of disintegration, only add to the sense of loneliness and gloom dominating their lives. A conversation between friends shatters the idealized vision of love; verbal abuse constitutes a family interaction; and masochistic self-loathing fills internal monologues. The author's own attitude toward the world and the characters she has created is sardonic at best.

== Selected works ==
- Highway with Green Apples (푸른 사과가 있는 국도; 1995, Short Stories). Includes the short story "Highway with green apples", translated into English by Sora Kim-Russell for the December 18, 2013 issue of Day One, a digital literary journal by Amazon Publishing
- Rhapsody in Blue (랩소디 인 블루; 1995, novel).
- Wind Doll (바람인형; 1996, Short Stories)
- Careless Love (부주의한 사랑; 1996, Novel)
- If You Meet Your Love Someday (만일 당신이 사랑을 만나면; 1997, Poetry)
- Midnight Communication (심야통신; 1998, Short Stories)
- Cheolsu (철수; 1998, Short Novel). Translated by Sora Kim-Russell as Nowhere to Be Found. AmazonCrossing, 2015.
- The First Love of Him (그 사람의 첫사랑; 1999, Short Stories)
- "There is a Man inside Me" (내 안에 남자가 숨어있다; 2000, Essay)
- Ivana (이바나; 2002, Novel).
- Zoo-Kind (동물원 킨트; 2002, Novel)
- Sunday at the Sukiyaki Restaurant (일요일 스키야키 식당; 2003, Novel).
- The Essayist's Desk (에세이스트의 책상; 2003, Novel). Translated by Deborah Smith as A Greater Music, Open Letter, 2016.
- Solitary Scholar (독학자; 2004, Novel).
- Hul (훌; 2006, Short Stories). Includes the short story "Time in Gray" (회색時), translated as a standalone volume by Chang Chung-hwa (장정화) and Andrew James Keast for ASIA Publishers' Bilingual Edition Modern Korean Literature Series, 2013; and the short story "Towards Marzahn" (낯선 천국으로의 여행), translated by Annah Overly in 2014.
- North-Facing Living Room (북쪽 거실; 2009, Novel).
- The Owl's Absence (올빼미의 없음; 2010, Short Stories). Includes the short story "North Station" (북역), translated by Deborah Smith, Open Letter, 2017.
- The Low Hills of Seoul (서울의 낮은 언덕들; 2011, Novel). Translated by Deborah Smith as Recitation, Deep Vellum, 2017.
- Inscrutable Nights and Days (알려지지 않은 밤과 하루; 2013, Novel). Translated by Deborah Smith.
- "A Week with Sleeping Man" (잠자는 남자와 일주일을; 2014, Essay)
- "A First-Meeting Nomad Woman" (처음 보는 유목민 여인; 2015, Essay)
- Milena, Milena, Magnificent (밀레나, 밀레나, 황홀한; 2016, Short Stories). Includes the short story "The English Garden" (영국식 뒷마당), translated by Janet Hong, The Best Asian Speculative Fiction, 2018.
- Snake and Water (뱀과 물; 2017, Short Stories). Translated by Janet Hong.
- If One Day is Different from Others, Why it would be (어느 하루가 다르다면, 그것은 왜일까; 2017, Short Stories). Selected works for Munhak-Dongne Publishing (Literal Village Pub.) Korean Literature Classics No.25 - Including works from Highways with green apples, Midnight Communication, The first love of him, Hul, and The owl's absence.

== Awards ==
• Dongseo Literary Prize, 2004

• Hankook Ilbo Literary Prize, 2003

• Writer in Residence in Zürich, 2018
