= Buckland riot =

1857 anti-Chinese race riot in Australia

The Buckland riot was an anti-Chinese race riot that occurred on 4 July 1857, in the goldfields of the Buckland Valley, Victoria, Australia, near present-day Porepunkah. At the time approximately 2000 Chinese and 700 European migrants were living in the Buckland area.

== Riot ==
Anti-Chinese sentiment was widespread during the Victorian gold rush. This resentment manifested on 4 July 1857 when around 100 European rioters attacked Chinese settlements. The rioters had just left a public meeting at the Buckland Hotel where the riot ringleaders decided they would attempt to expel all the Chinese in the Buckland Valley. Contemporaneous newspaper reports claim that the riot was "led by Americans 'inflamed by liquor'".

During the riot Chinese miners were beaten and robbed then driven across the Buckland River. At least three Chinese miners died reportedly of ill-health and entire encampments and a recently constructed Joss house were destroyed.

Police arrested thirteen European accused rioters, however the empaneled juries acquitted all of major offences "amid the cheers of bystanders". The verdicts of the juries were later criticized in the press.

One of the police involved in the arrests was Robert O'Hara Burke, later of the infamous Burke and Wills expedition.

== Aftermath ==
The Chinese miners were invited to return to the Buckland Valley, however only fifty did so.

The Buckland Riot has been compared to the Eureka Stockade uprising in size and intensity, but is not remembered such.

A commemorative monument was unveiled in July 2007 to mark the 150th anniversary of the riot.

== See also ==
- Morses Creek Riots
- Lambing Flat riots (1860 - 1861)
- White Australia policy
