= Heavenly Queen Temple (Melbourne) =

Taoist temple in Melbourne, Australia

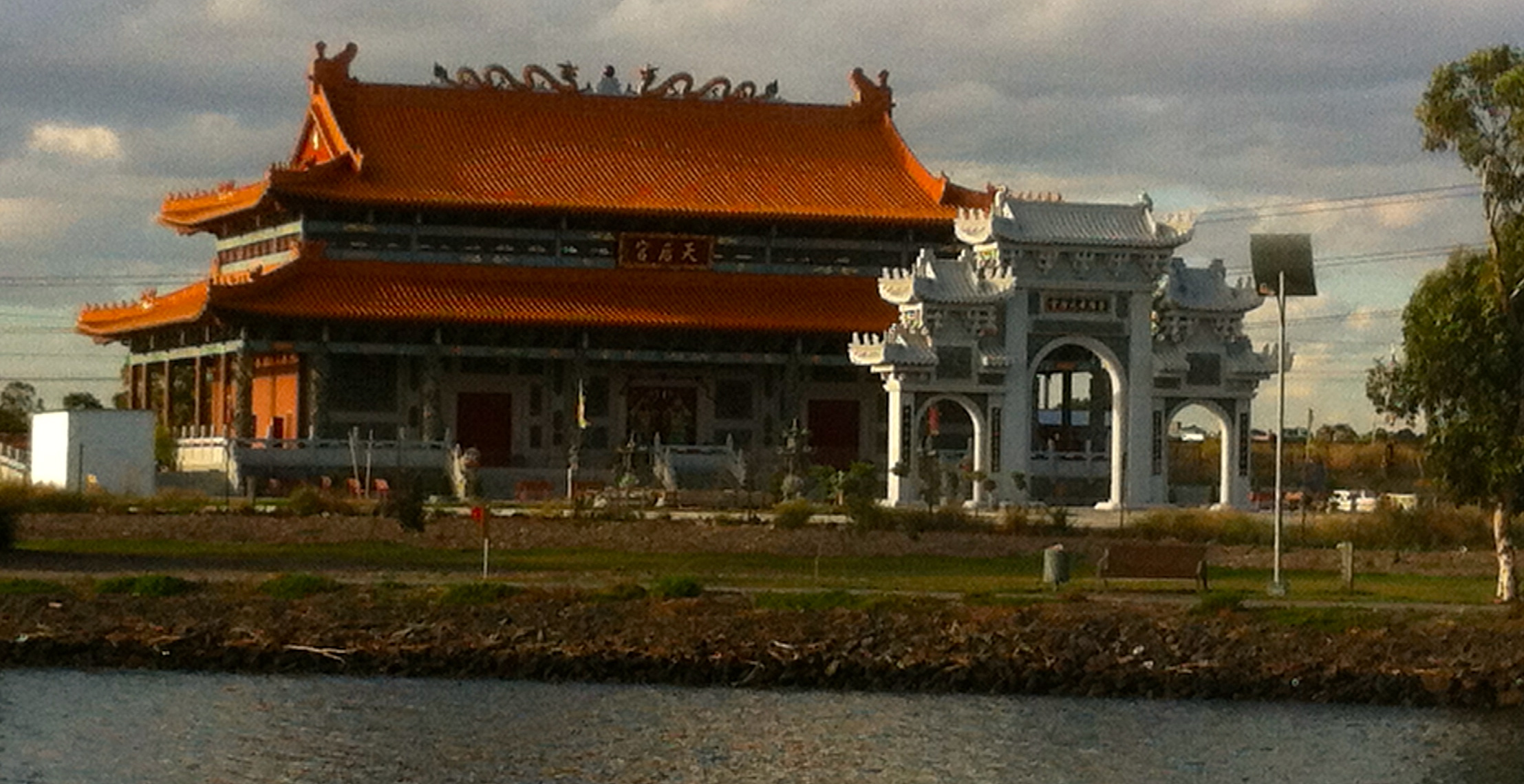

Religion
- Affiliation: Chinese folk religion
- Deity: Mazu

Location
- Interactive map of Heavenly Queen Temple
- Coordinates: 37°47′55″S 144°54′51″E

Heavenly Queen Temple
- Traditional Chinese: 天后宮
- Literal meaning: Heavenly Queen Palace
Transcriptions
Standard Mandarin
- Hanyu Pinyin: Tiānhòu Gōng
- Wade–Giles: T'ien-hou Kung

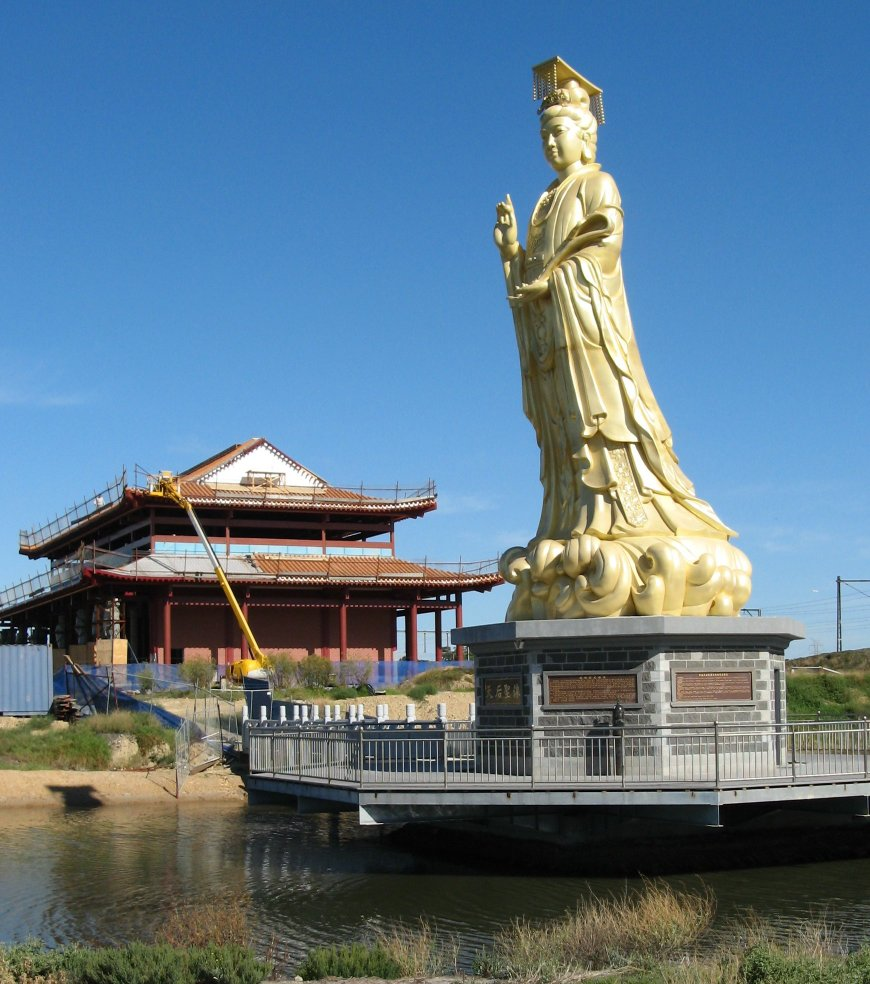
The statue of Mazu, 2010

The Heavenly Queen Temple is a Chinese folk religious temple dedicated to Mazu or Tian Shang Sheng Mu (天上聖母), Chinese Goddess of Sea and patron deity of fishermen, sailors and any occupations related to the sea or ocean. She is also regarded as an ancestral deity of the Lim (林) Clan.

The temple is located in the Melbourne suburb of Footscray, approximately four kilometres from the Melbourne CBD, and overlooks the Maribyrnong River. It is Australia's largest Taoist temple and includes a 50-foot (15 m) gold-painted stainless steel statue of Mazu imported from Nanjing, China, installed in 2008. The statue was the second of its kind in Australia.

The temple complex is based on the Forbidden City in Beijing, and the main temple opened in 2012. The temple's first stage was completed in 2013 at the cost of $5 million after 5 years of construction. The main hall opened to the public in 2015, but construction of the temple complex continued until 2020 with two additional halls completed.

When finished, the temple complex will cover approximately 40,000 square metres. About two-thirds of the land will comprise a Chinese Garden and car park, and the total floor area of the buildings will cover approximately 5000 square meters.

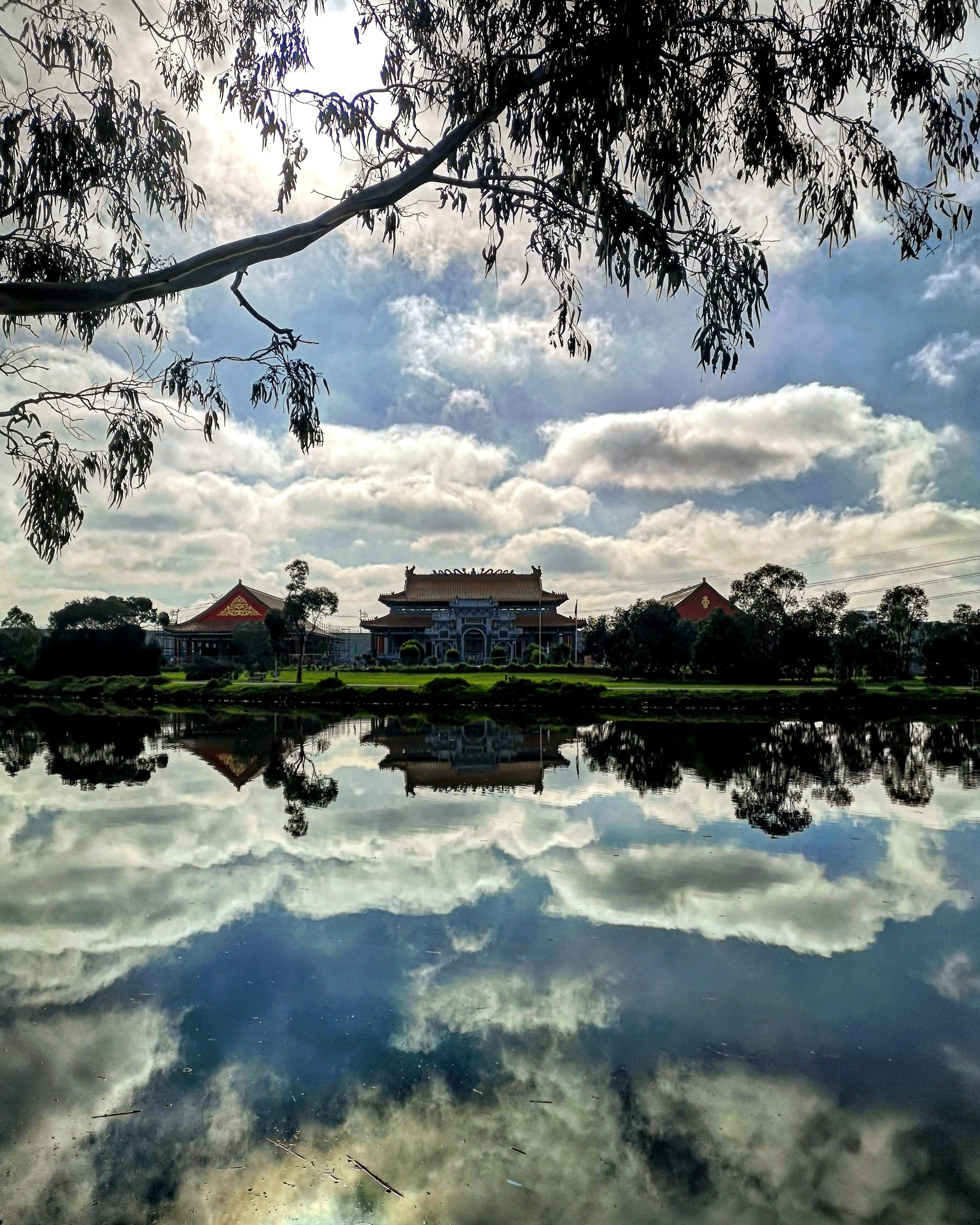
Heavenly Queen temple, viewed across the Maribyrnong River, 2020

== See also ==
- A-Ma Temple, Macau
- Ma-Cho Temple, Philippines
- List of Mazu temples around the world
- Qianliyan & Shunfeng'er
- Tin Hau temples in Hong Kong
