= Jeon Sungtae =

South Korean writer (born 1969)

Jeon Sung-tae
- 전성태
- Born: 1969; Goheung
- Education: Chung-Ang University
- Occupation: Novelist
- Writing career
- Language: Korean

Korean name
- Hangul: 전성태
- Hanja: 全成太
- RR: Jeon Seongtae
- MR: Chŏn Sŏngt'ae

Jeon Sungtae is a South Korean writer.

South Korea’s 1980s was a time when university students were on the frontlines of political activism, which later contributed to the growth of various civil movements. To categorize the political lines of liberal university students of the 1980s, There was the PD (People Democracy), which focused on labor movements based on Marxist ideologies, and the NL (National Liberty), which thought the most important thing was reunification based on their studies of North Korea’s Juche ideology. Jeon Sungtae is a writer who thinks that the contradiction of South Korean society arises from the special nature of being a divided nation. Therefore, the various characters in Jeon Sungtae’s fiction agonize over the tragic situation of war and division between North and South Korea, while at the same time also suffering from the oppressive reality that such conditions give rise to.

== Life ==
Jeon Sungtae was born in 1969 in Goheung County, Jeollanam-do Province, South Korea. His birthplace was a countryside town in Goheung, Jeollanamdo consisting of 20 households. Having grown up here, his memories from his youth became a very important foundation in forming his literary mindset that is slightly antiquated and humorous. Jeon Sungtae has said that "at the time of my literary debut, the popular trends were of the X generation, and the Orange Tribe. Writers of my age were writing about cultural experiences like the Sampoong Department Store and Seo Taiji. So I had a complex about the fact that I wrote stories about country boys who dig holes for fun and catch frogs to sell. I felt a bit intimidated among all these writers armed with urban sensibilities, like a lone grain of black rice among all the white rice." Later, Jeon Sungtae studied creative writing at Chung-Ang University, and began his literary career when he was awarded the Silcheon Munhak New Writer’s Award in 1994.

His published works include the short story collections Dubeonui jahwasang (두번의 자화상 The Second Self-Portrait), Wolves (늑대), Kukkyeongeul neomneun il (국경을 넘는 일 Over The Border), and Maehyang (매향 Burying Incense); the novel Yeoja ibalsa (여자 이발사 The Female Barber); and the book of essays Sungtae, Mangtae, Buri Bungtae (성태 망태 부리 붕태). He has also written a book of reportage Gileseo mannan sesang (길에서 만난 세상 The World I Met On the Road), and children’s books Gutenbereukeu (구텐베르크 Gutenberg) and Janghwahongryeonjeon (장화홍련전 The Story of Janghwa and Hongryeon). Later he won the Sin Dong-yup Prize for Literature, the Mu-young Literature Prize, the Chae Man-sik Literary Award, the Oh Yeongsu Literary Award, the Hyundae Literary Award, the Lee Hyo-seok Literary Award, and the Hankook Ilbo Literary Award.

== Writing ==
When evaluating Jeon Sungtae, what is commonly discussed is that he is a rich storyteller who has inherited the narrative tradition of Korea. That is why he is considered as a writer who joins the line of authors Kim Yujung, Chae Man-sik, Lee Mun Ku, and Hwang Sok-yong. However, aside from his appeal as a talented storyteller, another strength of his that is important is his ability to tell a story about social issues at personal levels in detail. Jeon Sungtae, who debuted in 1994 with winning the Silcheon Munhak New Writer’s Award, he has described his interests for fiction as following: "When I was in university, I did creative work in groups, and started writing for the idea that this was something I’d do for the rest of my life. When I had just turned 30, I was also the secretary general of the Association of Writers for National Literature. But when socialism failed, I began to question about ‘whether our problems of desire are going to be resolved if we achieve a society that we want’. And after that my writing became more flexible". Roughly explained, Jeon Sungtae’s first and second collections, Maehyang (매향 Burying Incense), and Kukkyeongeul neomneun il (국경을 넘는 일 Over The Border) were stories that he formed from doubts and questions regarding the process of practicing social activism. However, after his third collection Wolves (늑대), it can be said that his subject matter was expanded to the problem of desire coming from capitalism.

His colleague Paik Gahuim said of Jeon Sungtae: "Jeon Sungtae is an unprolific writer. He has written fiction in a very careful way, and the fiction he has written has become established very preciously. His wits carried out in real situations have given pride to the aesthetic superiority of our literature. Especially in the 1990s, when the direction of fiction was heading toward individual stories of members of society, he was diving more deeply into our society and reality. This is why it is natural that his works occupy an important role in our literary history. Because realism isn’t something that changes with the changes of time. Considering that fiction is a very trivial thing that could only be played out in the streets of ordinary people in the real world, that it is a genre that can only have a voice through the sight of that reality, his fiction was a great thing."

== Works ==
=== Short story collections ===
- Dubeonui jahwasang (두번의 자화상 The Second Self-Portrait), Changbi, 2015. Wolves (늑대), Changbi, 2009.
- Kukkyeongeul neomneun il (국경을 넘는 일 Over The Border), Changbi, 2005.
- Maehyang (매향 Burying Incense), Silcheon Munhak, 1999.

=== Novels ===
- Yeoja ibalsa (여자 이발사 The Female Barber), Changhae, 2005.

=== Works in Translation ===
- Wolves (English)

== Awards ==
- 48th Hankook Ilbo Literary Award (2015)
- 16th Lee Hyo-seok Literary Award (2015)
- 57th Hyundae Literary Award in Fiction (2011)
- 19th Oh Yeongsu Literary Award (2011)
- 10th Mu-young Literature Prize (2010)
- The National Literature Research Institute’s Writer of the Year (2010)
- 6th Chae Man-sik Literary Award (2009)
- Silcheon Munhak New Writer’s Award (1994)
