= Pyun Hye-young =

South Korean writer (born 1972)

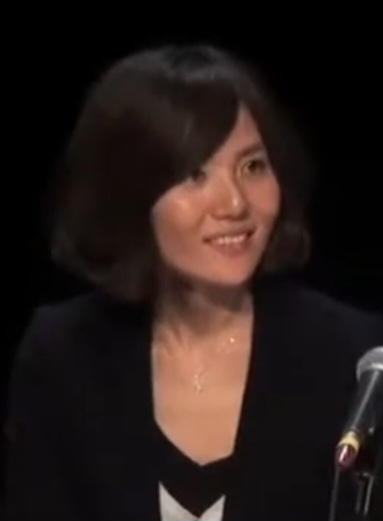
- Born: 1972 (age 53–54); South Korea
- Occupation: Author
- Writing career
- Language: Korean
- Period: 1972–present
- Genre: Modernist
- Notable work: The Hole
- Notable awards: Shirley Jackson Award (2017)

Korean name
- Hangul: 편혜영
- Hanja: 片惠英
- RR: Pyeon Hyeyeong
- MR: P'yŏn Hyeyŏng

Pyun Hye-young (Korean: 편혜영, born 1972) is a South Korean writer. She won the 2017 Shirley Jackson Award for Best Novel for her novel The Hole.

== Background and education ==
Pyun Hye-young was born in Seoul in 1972. She earned her undergraduate degree in creative writing and graduate degree in Korean literature from Hanyang University. After receiving these degrees, Pyun worked as an office worker. Many of her stories feature office workers.

== Publishing Career ==
Pyun began publishing in 2000. She has published three collections of stories, Aoi Garden, To the Kennels: And Other Stories, and Evening Proposal, as well as four novels, The Owl Cries: A Novel, City of Ash and Red, The Hole, and The Law of Lines.

In 2007, her collection To the Kennels won the Hankook Ilbo Literary Award. Her short story "O. Cuniculus" won the Yi Hyoseok Literature Prize in 2009 and then the Today's Young Writer Award in 2010. In 2011, Evening Proposal won the Dong-in Literary Award. Her works have several themes including alienation in modern life and an apocalyptic world, and they are often infused with grotesque images.

The novel City of Ash and Red explores irony and the dual nature of humanity. It was named a "Best Book of 2018" by NPR.

== Works in English ==
=== Stories ===
- "O Cuniculus," in Words Without Borders, translated by Sora Kim-Russell
- "Mallow Gardens" and "Corpses" (This is a PDF file hosted by Acta Koreana)
- "To the Kennels," in AZALEA, Issue 2, 2008, p. 307

=== Collections ===
- Evening Proposal, translated by Park Youngsuk and Gloria Cosgrove Smith, Dalkey Archive Press, 2016, ISBN 9781628971545
- To the Kennels: And Other Stories, translated by Sora Kim-Russell and Heinz Insu Fenkl, Arcade Publishing, 2024, ISBN 9781956763669

=== Novels ===
- The Hole. Translated by Sora Kim-Russell (English hardcover 1st ed.). Arcade Publishing. 2017. ISBN 9781628727807.
- City of Ash and Red. Translated by Sora Kim-Russell (English hardcover 1st ed.). Arcade Publishing. 2018. ISBN 9781628727814.
- The Law of Lines. Translated by Sora Kim-Russell (English hardcover 1st ed.). Arcade Publishing. 2020. ISBN 9781948924962.
- The Owl Cries: A Novel. Translated by Sora Kim-Russell. Arcade Publishing. 2023. ISBN 9781956763508.

== Works in Korean (partial) ==
=== Fiction collections ===
- 《아오이가든》(문학과지성사, 2005)
- 《사육장 쪽으로》(문학동네, 2007)
- 《저녁의 구애》(문학과지성사, 2011)
- 《죽은 자로 하여금》 (현대문학, 2018)

=== Long fiction ===
- 《재와 빨강》(창비, 2010)
- 《서쪽 숲에 갔다》(문학과지성사, 2012)

== Awards ==
- 2007 40th Hankook Ilbo Literary Award for her collection To the Kennels
- 2007 The 5th Proud Cultural Impression Award
- 2009 The 10th Hyo-Seok Lee Literature Award
- 2010 The 18th Today's Young Artist Award (Literature Division)
- 2012 42nd Dong-in Literary Award
- 2014 48th Yi Sang Literary Award
- 2017 11th Shirley Jackson Award for best novel, for The Hole
