= Chinese immigration to Sydney =

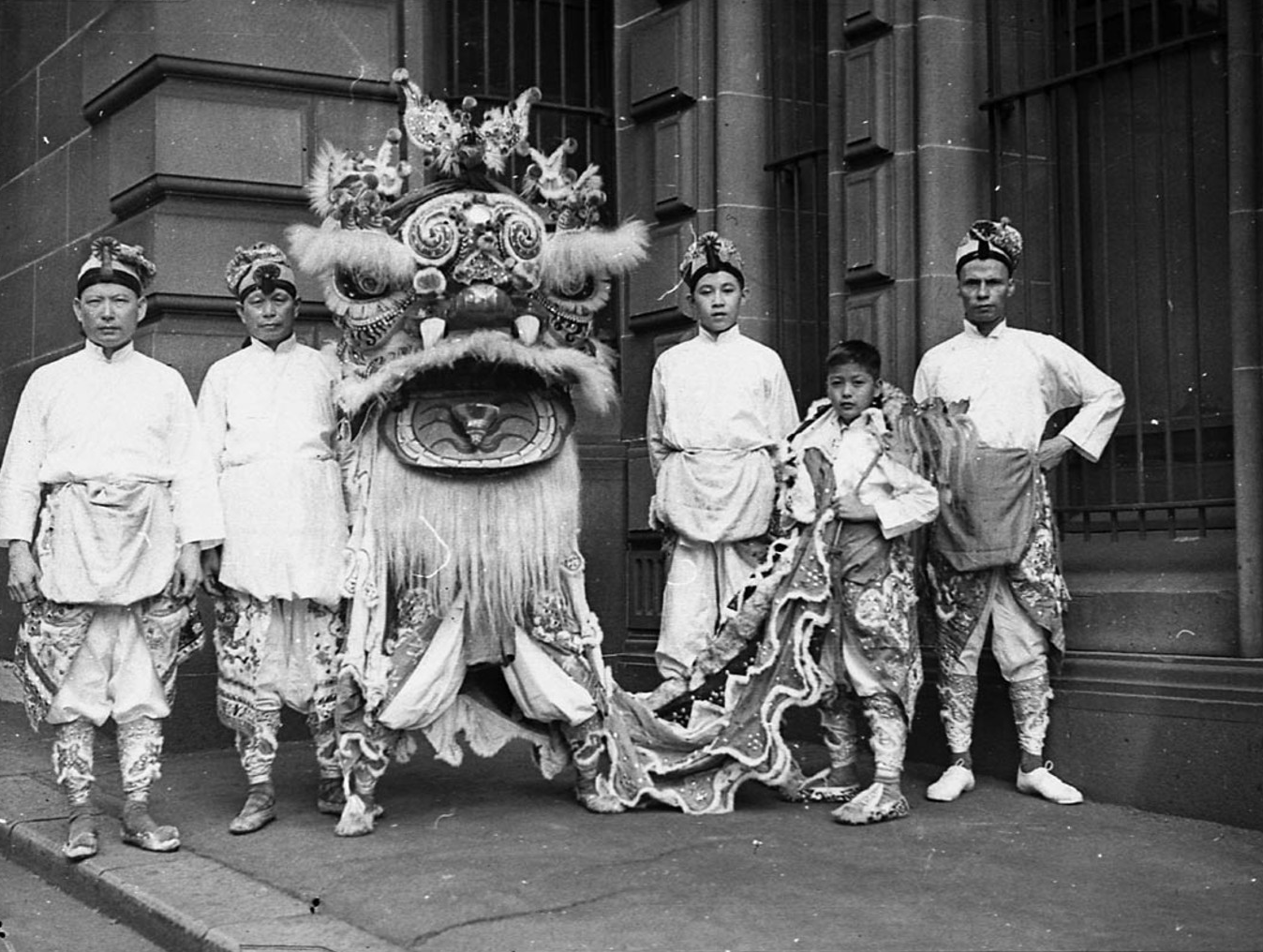
Chinese immigrants to Australia at the Pageant of Nations, Sydney Town Hall, 1938

Chinese immigration to Sydney (Chinese: Chinese: 悉尼华人; pinyin: Xīní huárén) dates back almost two hundred years, with Mak Sai Ying being the first recorded settler in Australia. The 2006 census showed that 221,995 people (5.39%) in Sydney reported Cantonese or Standard Chinese as the language they used at home. The suburbs of Burwood, Eastwood, Campsie and Rhodes have plurality Chinese populations.

Chinese immigration was seen as part of a solution for a labour shortage in New South Wales from 1828 onwards, though the scale of immigration remained low until later in the nineteenth century.

What came to be known as the White Australia policy saw a series of restrictive legislation passed at both a state and later a federal level. The climate of fear and distrust eased somewhat from the 1950s onwards, and today Chinese communities form a vibrant and important part of Sydney's character.

Chinese immigration has increased continuously from the 1990s and today the Chinese are the third largest group among immigrants. Since the mid-1990s, migration has become less permanent than it used to be, and goes in more than one direction, a trend that pertains also to the Chinese. Students and academics are examples of this pattern. In 1990, Chinese settlers rarely returned permanently, but by 2002, the number of Hong Kong settlers leaving Australia for good equalled those arriving during that year.

== First arrivals to Sydney ==
The earliest documented Chinese settler was Mak Sai Ying, who arrived in 1818, and purchased land in Parramatta. He married an English woman; Sarah Thompson, in 1823, changed his name to John Shying, and by 1829 held the licence for a Parramatta public house, the Lion. He returned to China in 1832, but was back in Sydney five years later. Some of his children became furniture makers, and descendants live in Melbourne today. This story of integrating while maintaining ties with China was repeated over and over in the nineteenth century. European immigrants often found the long trip 'home' a daunting prospect, but many Chinese did not feel so distant from old connections.

The shortage of labour that followed the ending of the convict system in the 1840s encouraged some tentative imports of so-called 'coolie' labour from China. The first large group arrived from Amoy (Xiamen) on the Nimrod, which docked at Henry Moore's wharf at Millers Point in October 1848, where about half of the 121 Chinese passengers disembarked. By 1852 more than 1500 had arrived. The intention was that they would work as indentured labourers on rural holdings, but some remained in Sydney and others escaped the isolation of the bush and returned to town. A five-year indenture meant very little once gold had been discovered, and the Chinese, like everyone else who caught gold fever, deserted their posts for the diggings.

== Fear, disease and restriction ==
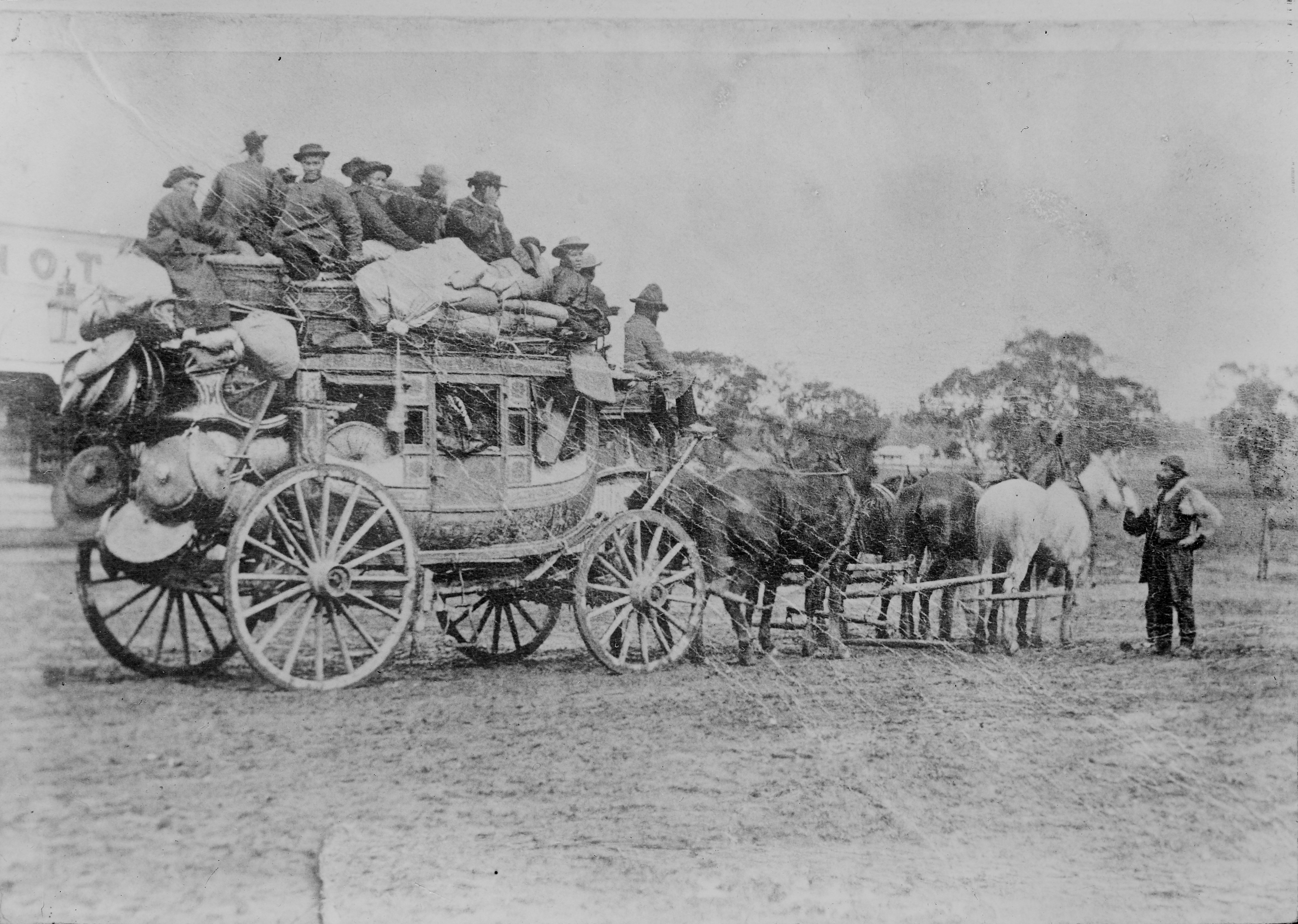
Chinese gold prospectors travelling to gold fields, ca. 1900–1920.

By early 1852 news of gold had reached southern China, and many men from Cantonese and Xiamen shippers arrived under a credit-ticket system, with fares to be paid once fortunes were made. Very few arrived on their own steam. Consequently, most Chinese immigrants were looking for gold in the gold fields of Australia as well as rural regions of Australia such as Wong Ah Sat. The first act designed to keep Chinese out was in place by 1861, but was repealed in 1867 in response to declining arrivals. New gold rushes and larger numbers led to tighter restrictions being reintroduced in 1881 and 1888.

Ironically it was not only the 'otherness' of the Chinese that fuelled racist responses to them, but also China's proximity. China was close enough to allow ships to arrive within the incubation period of certain diseases. Prince Henry Hospital was established at then isolated Little Bay, south of the city, in response to an outbreak of smallpox in 1881, accompanied by strident anti-Chinese sentiment. An isolation area for lepers existed there until the 1960s, and this most shunned of diseases was also associated with the Chinese.

== Staying and going ==
But while many Chinese came, very few stayed. In 1880, for example, the Eastern and Australian Steamship Company made 19 trips between Sydney and Hong Kong, moving 2,564 people in and 2,569 back to China, leaving a deficit of five. Furthermore, large influxes of Chinese after February resulted from reduced movements during the Chinese New Year, a pattern that persists today. The constant movement in and out of the port of Sydney contributed to the city's economic growth. From the start of the gold rushes there were Chinese who understood that a more certain fortune, or at least a living, would be made in the city, by providing the incoming fortune seekers with a place to sleep, picks and shovels and bags of rice.

Officially there were 189 Chinese living in Sydney on census night in 1861, rising to 336 in 1871 and 1,321 in 1881. Most were men, though a few had managed to get permission to bring in their wives. Immigration arrangements often involved dense layers of obligation and sometimes extortion, and many Chinese who were unsuccessful in fortune-hunting were unable to go home. Menial jobs in Sydney sometimes allowed them to accumulate enough capital to return with honour, and to achieve this they were prepared to live very frugally.

== Chinatown in the Rocks ==
By the 1860s, Sydney's business directories listed Chinese premises, especially in The Rocks, with a concentration of Chinese shops, cook-shops and boarding houses on Lower George Street, close to the wharves. By 1870 there were also at least five furniture stores listed in this area, indicating more integrated economic activity. One of the largest was the workshop of Ah Toy, which not only manufactured cheap furniture but also filled orders for the up-market David Jones department store.

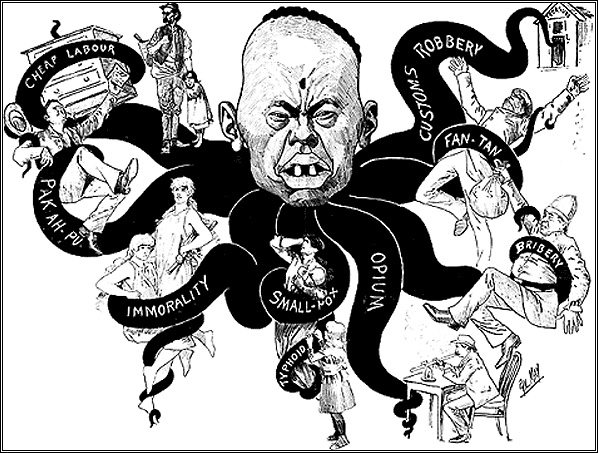
The Mongolian Octopus: his grip on Australia 1886

In 1878 an upsurge of violence against Chinese traders led them to petition the colonial government for protection from 'larrikins'. This anti-Chinese behaviour was linked to trade union meetings calling for a halt to immigration, where speakers had openly advocated violence. The unions opposed the low wages paid to Chinese workers by Chinese employers, but their solution was not to work for better pay and conditions, as some organised Chinese furniture workers urged, but to advocate exclusion. In November, the Seamen's Union struck against the Australian Steam Navigation Company's use of cheap Chinese labour. Several public rallies were held, and following a large anti-Chinese torchlight meeting in Hyde Park, a group of protesters decided to march on Parliament House to demand exclusion of the Chinese. A different group, reported by the police as numbering around 2,000, headed up Pitt Street to Bridge Street and thence to Ah Toy's furniture shop in Queen's Place (now Dalley Street). Here the mob attempted to torch the building, probably aware that many Chinese workers were asleep upstairs.

Chinese men were found living with 73 opium addicted Australian white women when Quong Tart surveyed the goldfields for opium addicts, and a lot of homeless women abused by husbands and prostitutes ran away and married Chinese men in Sydney after taking refuge in Chinese opium dens in gambling houses, Reverend Francis Hopkins said that 'A Chinaman's Anglo-Saxon wife is almost his God, a European's is his slave. This is the reason why so many girls transfer their affections to the almond-eyed Celestials.' when giving the reason why these women married Chinese men.

White men in Australia were afraid of the sexual and racial threats they thought came from Pacific islander and Asian men and it was written that the Chinaman "marries, or cohabits with the mean white woman, jostles and competes with the white man, and when it comes to labouring in the tropics, supplants him." in the Sydney Morning Herald, with interracial sex and prostitution booming in Northern Australia because of the racial sexual imbalance due to the fact that Australia hardly ever permitted the immigration of non-white women.

Around Melbourne's Little Bourke Street precinct and Sydney's Lower George Street grew majority Chinese male enclaves and in total in Australia there were 50,000 Chinese labourers and ministers by 1870, with opium dens being a standard thing found around the Chinese ghettos, the Chinese men were married by poor white women or serviced by poor white women prostitutes, who filled the missing female niche in the Chinese community and this led to condemnation of the white women as opium users and inflamed anti-Chinese sentiment.

A parliamentary commission was held regarding Sydney's Chinese gambling which brought white European women to testify on 14 December 1891, such as 27-year-old Minnie, who had long-term relationships with two Chinese men who treated her kindly after she engaged in "casual" sexual relations with multiple Chinese men.

Minnie ended up having sex with Chinese men after meeting them with friends who were also doing it, after she ran away from an abusive alcoholic husband when she was 16. Seven other women were interviewed besides Minnie, girls and women escaped a dangerous street life by taking sanctuary in the inner city and The Rocks with the Chinese, another woman interviewed was Hannah, who escaped her jailed brutal European husband to go live with a Chinese man, explaining that 'I thought it was better to have one man than be knocking about the streets with everybody', since the husband's 'people would not look after me', and Minnie said, 'I think fully half of them come to the Chinese when they have nowhere else to go', and she was asked 'Is it because the Chinese are kind to them?' she said 'That is the main thing, and for the sake of a home.'

Some of the European husbands and partners of the women tried forcing them to work as prostitutes to 'knock about the streets' and take the money they earned or were physically violent towards the women, which led the women to go to the Chinese who provided them with houses, Pauline explained "I would sooner live with a Chinaman than a white man. The Chinamen know how to treat a woman.' after her European husband tried to make her be a prostitute, a woman named Maud said 'he tries to please me, and I try to please him' and a woman named Adelaide loved and wanted to marry a young Chinese man but his father forced him to break off the relationship, another two women interviewed were Ellen A and Ellen B.

Some of these women still engaged in prostitution with multiple other Chinese men even after they formed a relationship with a single Chinese man, these women were proud of being wives of the Chinese and their well-maintained houses, saying they were 'clean and tidy' and the commissioners even said they were 'clean and even tastefully furnished', and Ellen B said 'You always see all the Chinese women's houses clean and comfortable', 'always plenty to eat and drink' and Minnie said she was 'living respectably with a Chinaman', the women also viewed non-white men of different races in a different light, saying that the 'dark' men like Lascars were different from the Chinese and Ellen B said 'there is not a girl with the Chinese that cares about a dark fellow.'

The commission admitted that 'they have some reason to be satisfied, as they say they are, with their surroundings. The probability is that they would be on the streets of Sydney if they were not the mistresses of industrious Chinamen.' and admitted that without the opium problem that 'it would be impossible to say that these, among the most unfortunate class of women in our midst, had not improved their surroundings by crossing the racial line' and 'there is not ground for suspicion that our alien population is now a danger to youthful virtue.' so the commission only ended up advocating tougher anti-opium measures, the women also rejected the claim by Inspector Richard Seymour in 1875 that opium rendered girls unconscious and vulnerable to sexual activity, making it clear that opium smokers were conscious during the smoking. During an Inquiry in 1875 it was reported by the police that the Chinese were being serviced by young girls.

A European man originally impregnated Ellen B in Melbourne and she then moved to Beechworth, Albury and finally Sydney after she gave birth, arriving at an Anglican church run "Church Home" which was for "fallen women" where a woman there introduced her to the Chinese.

Chinese men in The Rocks were sexually serviced by 40-50 European women, these women were not 'mistresses' who lived with a single Chinese man like the women interviewed by the commission but they were full-time prostitutes. The commission admitted that 'The European women who lived as prostitutes amongst the Chinese appear, in nearly every case, to have fled to their present haunts as to refuges from the brutality of men of their own race. They had lost caste; they had taken to drink; they were the drudges of larrikins who ill-treated them; some had been in jail; none were enjoying the protection of decent homes. So, far the lack of better prospects, they sought the Chinamen, who at least pay them well and treat them kindly.' and these prostitutes were found in Queensland, Victoria, and New South Wales in the countryside amongst the Chinese settlements. A lot of the prostitutes were Irish Catholic girls and women in colonial Australia.

== Haymarket Chinatown ==
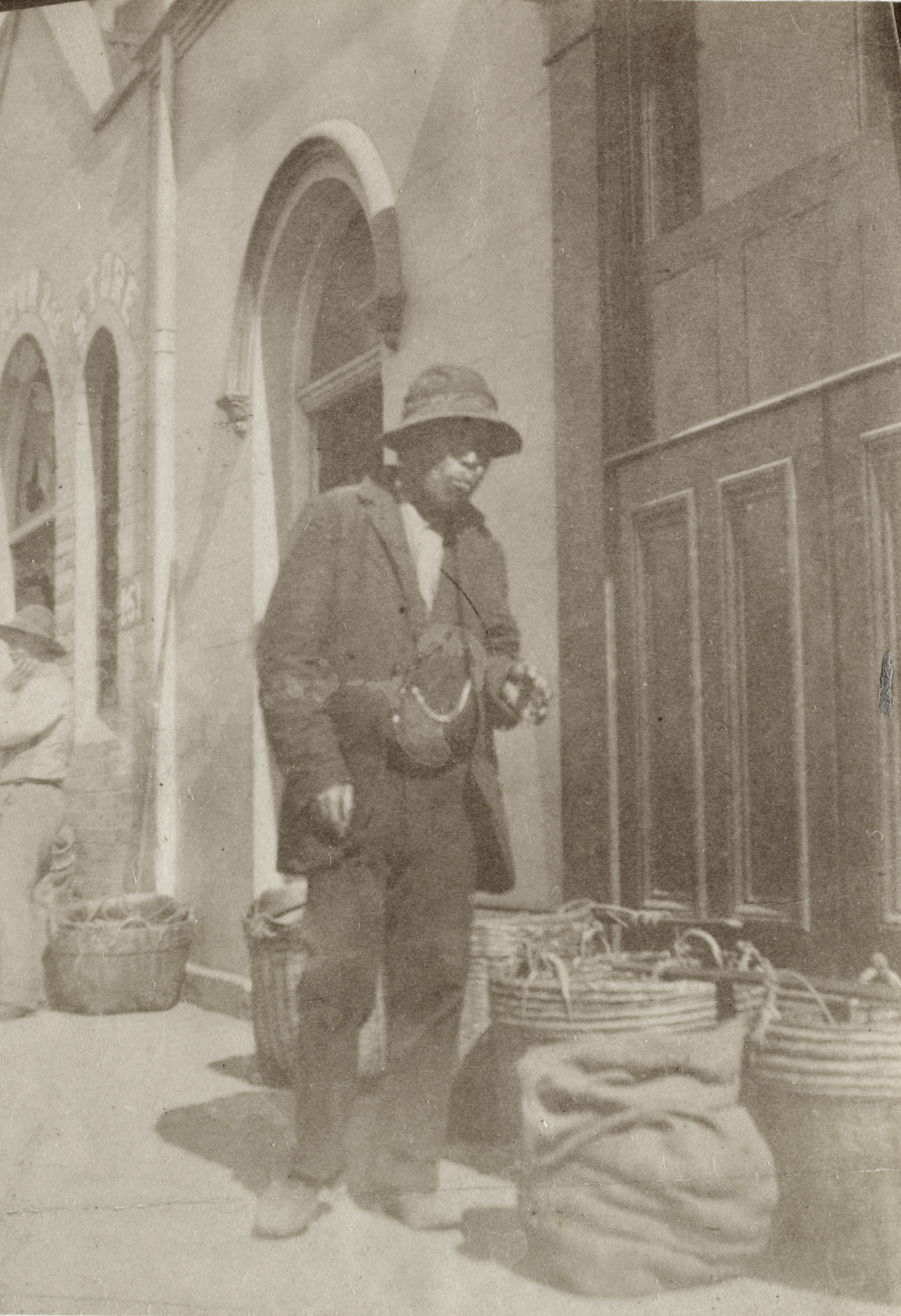
Two Chinese men in the street, Sydney, 1885-1890

By the 1870s there was also an established group of Chinese places at the Haymarket end of town, in Goulburn and Campbell Streets and their alleyways, near the Belmore fruit and vegetable markets. When market gardeners brought their produce to town they stayed here overnight in buildings that were nearing the end of their habitable life. In the once-notorious Durand's Alley, long recognised in official health reports as a 'wretched rookery', a large building run by Kow You Man could accommodate 100 men. The street was renamed Robertson Lane in the 1880s, after Robertson's coach factory, which itself was taken over and run as a boarding house in the late 1880s by Kwong Chong, who charged sixpence a night for a man, and sixpence a night for a horse. The men who worked the gardens were some of the poorest and least integrated of the Chinese, and the Anti-Chinese League frequently complained to the authorities about the state of properties in the Haymarket.

Nevertheless, many successful Chinese stores had consolidated in this area by the closing decade of the nineteenth century, some with new buildings and title deeds to show Chinese ownership. Many of the wealthier, established Chinese merchants chose to remain in The Rocks or to move to suburban villas, such as famous restaurateur and bon vivant Mei Quong Tart, who built his family seat in Ashfield. But streets close to the markets in the Haymarket became the preferred location for a small but growing number of Chinese families. Wexford Street was almost entirely tenanted by Chinese by 1900, and though it was widely considered a slum, many of its Chinese residents were respectable citizens. James Ung Quoy, a community spokesman, lived there, while the Reverend John Young Wai of the Chinese Presbyterian Church lived in nearby Mary Street, as did Sun Johnson, editor of the Chinese Australian Herald. When the commissioners of the 1891 Royal Commission into Alleged Chinese Gambling and Immorality visited some of these families they found, to their great surprise, that their houses were neat and homely. They were further surprised when Australian women gave evidence that they had married Chinese men because they loved them, and because they preferred the gentler ways of these men to the 'biffo' they could expect from some of the drunken Irishmen on offer. 'There could be no better man to me in the world' said Hannah (no surname given), of her Chinese husband.

A real glimpse of Sydney's Chinese comes from the 1891 Royal Commission, which took evidence from around 60 people, Chinese and non-Chinese, men and women, from labourers to the community's elite. Mei Quong Tart, perhaps the best known Chinese in Sydney at the time, was a commissioner, and his presence may have kept his fellow commissioners from straying into hyperbole. Their comments on opium smoking carefully noted the limits to this practice, and they found that Chinese gambling houses were dependent on European patronage for survival, and that overall, Chinese gambling accounted for only a tiny fraction of the gambling habits of Sydneysiders.

== Clan, village and temple ==
To outsiders, the Chinese were just Chinese, but internally, loyalties to clan and village origins were strong, often taking precedence over loyalties to Chinese nationalism. The 1891 Royal Commission noted that leading stores often doubled as bases for clan tongs (societies) which developed to look after the interests of men from different localities in China. They provided letter writers, ferried money home through personal chains of contact rather than untrustworthy banks, gave legal support, adjudicated disputes and attended to burials and removal of bones to China. These clan societies still exist today, supporting new arrivals and the needy.

The Influx of Chinese Restriction Act 1881 and the Chinese Restriction and Regulation Act 1888 succeeded in discouraging entry and making re-entry to Australia impossible except for a limited few. Rural areas slowly lost their Chinese population as the gold petered out, but Sydney's Chinese community grew, as the city became more attractive to the dwindling population who remained, either because they were in exempted categories, or because they held papers from an earlier period securing residency or naturalisation. According to the Census, by 1901 there were 3,276 men and 56 women 'born in China' living in Sydney. When part-Chinese and Chinese not born in China were added, 3,680 Chinese were recorded as living in Sydney. This process of concentration continued in the early twentieth century, as Chinese from other parts of the continent, including Melbourne, gravitated to Sydney. The Chinese community was firmly embedded in the landscape of the city and in surrounding suburbs where market gardens thrived. Chinese signs announced businesses in the Chinese sections of town. Chinese gardeners from Go Yui built a temple at Alexandria, then and now run by the Yui Ming Hung Fook Tong. The Sze Yup people did the same at Glebe Point. This temple was dedicated to Kwan Kung, symbolising loyalty and mutual support. More subtly, but nonetheless Chinese, the Chinese Anglican church in Wexford Street, Surry Hills, was adorned with a Chinese-inspired turret as well as a cross.

The enthusiasm for proselytising drew all the major Christian churches into the Chinese life of the city. A joint Cantonese-English service held in the Princes Street Wesleyan Chapel in The Rocks in 1886 celebrated the ordination of the Reverend Tear Tack. The Presbyterians, who had held Chinese services since the 1870s, became very active under the Reverend John Young Wai, who, among other things, translated Ira Sankey's hymn book into Cantonese. In 1885, Soo Hoo Ten, who had long ministered to Chinese Anglican congregations in the city and at Botany, was ordained in St Andrew's Cathedral.

== Political divisions ==
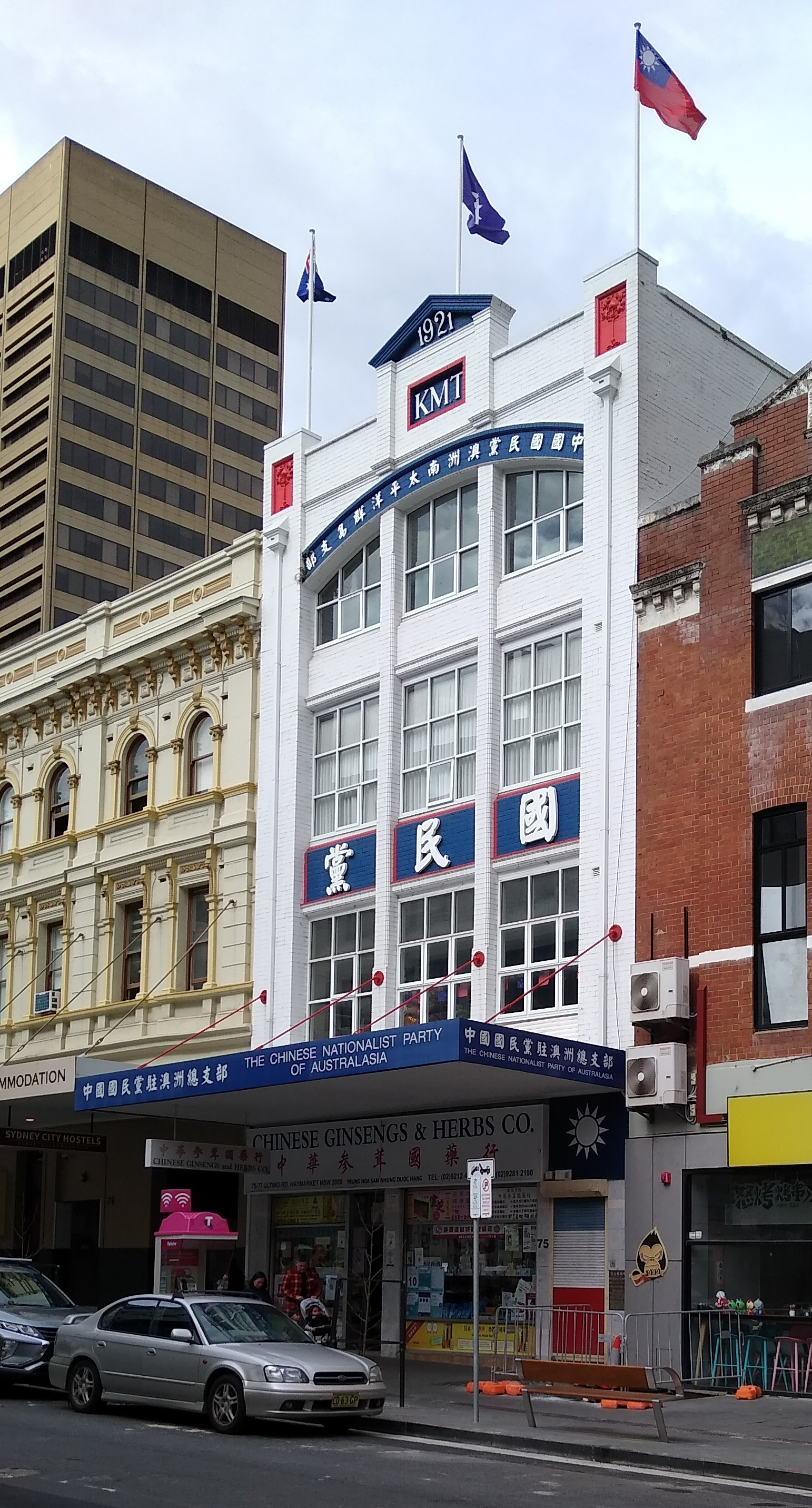
KMT building in Ultimo, built 1921–1922

But many Chinese were not religious, Christian or otherwise, and politically too, the community was diverse. With family and friends frequently moving between both places, the future of the motherland was immediately relevant for many of Sydney's Chinese. By the early twentieth century, a number of Chinese language newspapers published in Sydney were actively arguing over both local issues and the dramatic evolution of politics in China. In business ventures and on issues such as immigration regulations, Chinese leaders of all persuasions were capable of acting in concert for their common good, but when it came to Chinese politics, there were obvious divides.

Organisations such as the Chinese Empire Association and the Lin Yik Tong, which evolved into the Chinese Merchants' Society, eventually settling on the name Chinese Chamber of Commerce in 1913, used their mouthpiece, the Tung Wah Times, in support of the status quo in China. Thomas Yee Hing, of the old established Rocks firm of On Chong & Co, was prominent in the monarchist cause, as were Ping Nam and William Gockson.

Pro-republican elements were in part historically linked to the older nineteenth century Yee Hings, or the Hung League of secret societies (triads) dedicated to the overthrow of the Manchus. Though traditionally believed to be less than respectable, these groups repositioned themselves by the early twentieth century to be more acceptable to wider Chinese society. The movement went public in 1908, setting up offices in Surry Hills, and in 1912 it adopted the Anglo name of Chinese Masonic Society when it moved to new premises in Mary Street, Surry Hills. This building became the national headquarters for all Yee Hings, and this address remains the headquarters of the society today. Its early leaders Moy Sing and J.A. Chuey were prominent in the republican cause, as were Peter Yee Wing and Samuel Wong.

While some of Sydney's Chinese responded with dismay to the 'double tenth' (10 October 1911) uprising of the republican forces in southern China, most hoisted the new republican flag. The following January marked the first of many annual picnics at Cabarita and other harbour spots to celebrate the new Chinese nation, occasions that were always an excuse for exploding firecrackers in time-honoured Chinese fashion.

According to the pro-republican Chinese Australian Times, building temples in Sydney was backward-looking, and pro-republican clan groups, such as the Chung Shan Society, were more likely to raise money for schools and hospitals, supporting these institutions both in Sydney and China. Dr Sun Yat Sen, political leader of the republican movement, was conscious that overseas Chinese were a potential source of support and finance, especially if cultural connections were kept alive, and he encouraged the establishment of Chinese-language schools, such as that opened in Elizabeth Street, Sydney in 1910. Many of Sydney's Chinese originated from the same Chung Shan village as Dr Sun, and until his death in 1999, Dalton Gokbo (Bo) Liu liked to stress the close connection by telling the tale of visiting Sun's home with his father William (Uncle Billy) Liu in 1921 when he was secretary of the Sydney branch of the Kuomintang.

In 1919 a re-formed Kuomintang was setting up branches around the world, and in 1920 a convention with delegates from Australia, New Zealand and the Pacific met in Sydney. There was wide coverage in the English language press in Sydney, and a fine welcoming reception aboard the SS Victoria, of the recently formed ambitious China-Australia Mail Steamship Line. Spirits ran high. By mid-1921 the Nationalists had raised the $10,000 promised at the conference for the construction of a new building with reading rooms, lecture hall and residential quarters in Ultimo Road, which opened with great fanfare and the hoisting of the Republican flag in 1922.

But China did not prosper, the local steamship line quickly succumbed to a freight pricing war designed to squeeze it out of the market, and over the next decades continuing immigration restrictions generated a plethora of sad stories of people smuggling gone wrong, and harassment by authorities. Lonely old men were unable to marry, unable to return to an increasingly chaotic China and unable to assimilate into the Sydney scene. They are remembered as the 'left-overs', sitting out their days in meagre lodgings in Chinatown.

The ongoing primacy of the Sydney community was recognised by the relocation of China's consul-general from Melbourne to Sydney in 1928. Sydney's Chinese population held more or less steady, but as the rest of the nation's Chinese communities shrank in size, there was a general sense of contraction.

== Business success ==
Perhaps the only upbeat part of the Sydney Chinese story in these decades was the spectacular success of a few of the canniest of the fruit traders. While the Great Depression of the 1930s had a negative effect on the trading of many market gardeners and stallholders, a few firms were able to consolidate. When the City Council constructed new market buildings closer to Darling Harbour in the early years of the twentieth century, the Chinese traders followed. Dixon Street emerged as the hub of Sydney's third Chinatown.

A few firms successfully built on their wealth by trading back into China. With little incentive to invest in the hostile local economy, apparently modest establishments in Chinatown were in fact the headquarters of the substantial trading empires of the Wing On, Wing Sang, Tiy Sang and the interlocking Sang On Tiy companies.

Wing Sang, for example, began trading Fijian bananas into Sydney's markets in the 1890s, and eventually established a department store, allegedly along the lines of Sydney's Anthony Hordern & Sons, in Hong Kong in 1900. Branches in Canton and Shanghai followed, and by the 1960s, the Wing Sang Company was involved in banking, hotels and various manufacturing enterprises. The Wing On firm similarly grew out of fruit trading in the Haymarket to become a multi-faceted business empire. Eventually, three of the four companies that controlled the four largest modern department stores of Hong Kong and Shanghai, known locally as the "Four Great Companies", were founded by the partners of Wing Sang and Wing On: Wing On by the Kwok brothers of Wing On and their cousin George Kwok Bew of Wing Sang, Sincere by Ma Ying-piu of Wing Sang, and the Sun by Choy Chong of Wing Sang. The fourth, Sun Sun, was also established by Chinese-Australian traders from Sydney.

== Community life and politics ==
Back in Sydney, the little Chinese community was realigning itself as the politics of China rapidly shifted. The republicans, led by General Chiang Kai-shek, were now pitted against emerging communist forces under Mao Tse-tung, and gradually the Kuomintang came to represent more conservative elements. But the local Chinese community knew the Kuomintang, and in a local context of hostility to communism it remained the dominant social and political organisation. A smaller number of left-wing Chinese became active in the Chinese Youth League, established in 1939 in Dixon Street. Although all the Chinese organisations in Sydney knew where they lined up politically, all of them were also on the side of China.

This primary loyalty was never understood by the local intelligence agencies, which frequently failed to unravel and make sense of political connections in the Chinese community. All the active Chinese organisations provided social outlets through concerts, Cantonese opera, and film nights. Many ordinary Chinese were happy to go wherever they found companionship and solace in a hostile community firmly convinced of its own racial superiority and of the wisdom of 'White Australia'.

In an oral interview given in 1995, an elderly Chinese waterside worker, Albert Leong, summed it up well. Overtly Communist and well read in communist literature, he was involved politically in the Chinese Youth League, but he also went to the temple in Glebe ('just a social gathering'), to cemetery days at Rookwood ('a bit of a picnic'), to dances put on by the Kuomintang on the last Wednesday in the month, and to church at Surry Hills. 'We all went so we could see each other'.

== Japan, World War II and the People's Republic ==
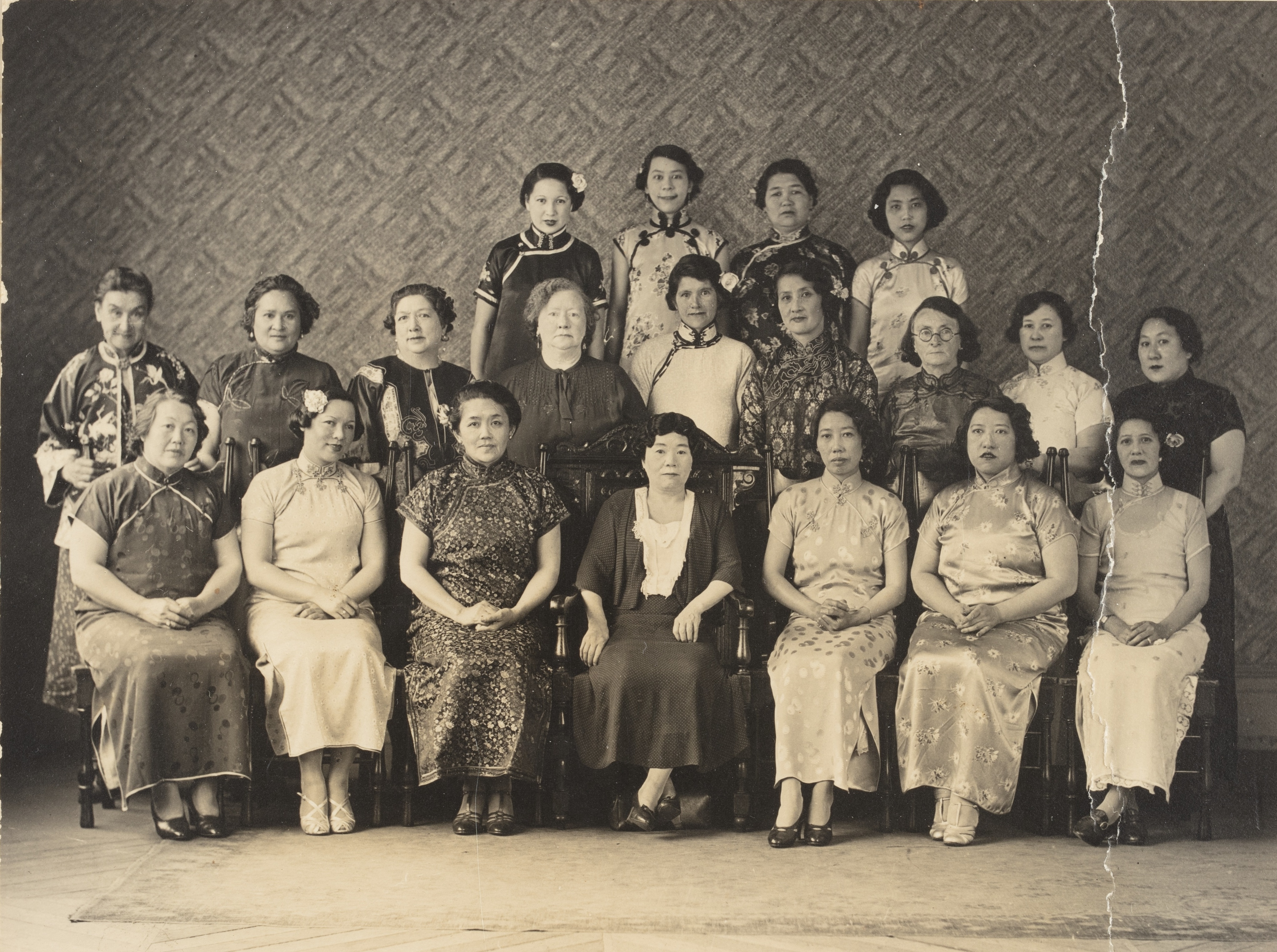
N.S.W. Chinese Women's Relief Fund, Sydney, 1938

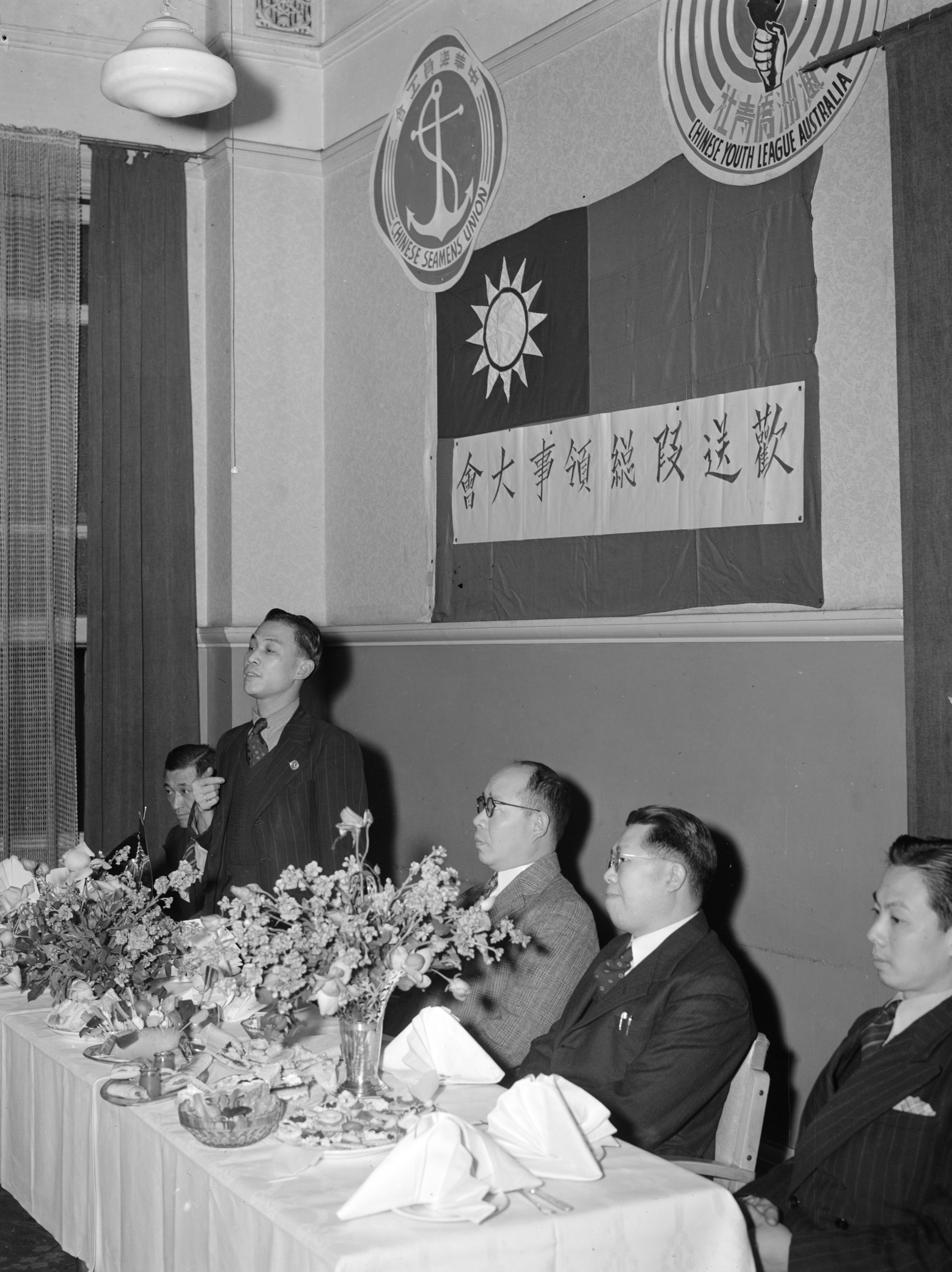
Chinese Seamen's Union and Chinese Youth League function, Sydney

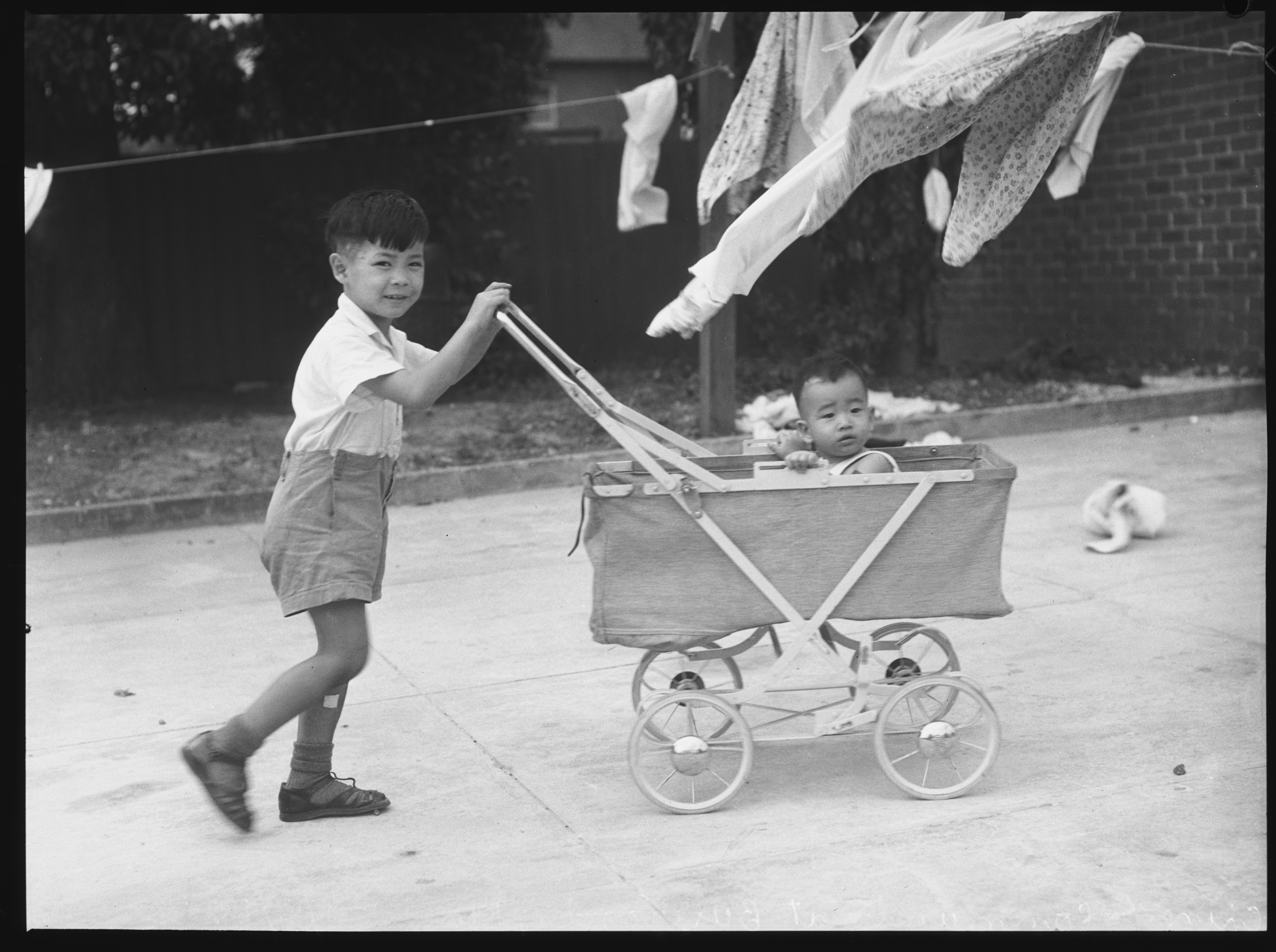
Boy pushing a pram, Chinese community at Burwood, Sydney, 30 March 1942

In the early dark days of the 1930s, with Australia favouring the Japanese in trade and ignoring Japan's expansionary plans for China and the Pacific, the Sydney Chinese community was ever anxious to educate the rest. This was the impetus for the George Ernest Morrison Lecture established by William Liu in 1932, and for a number of books and pamphlets written to put the Chinese case.

WW2 unified the Chinese community. They put on an extravagant Chinese Festival at the Sydney Showground the following year, during the sesquicentenary celebrations of the arrival of Europeans in Sydney in 1788. This spectacular event got rave reviews in the mainstream newspapers. The police estimated there were 40,000 people, with another 10,000 turned away, while the Sydney Morning Herald reported that 'tramway men said they had never seen anything like the pressure of people'. This involvement of the Chinese community in 'the Sesqui' was partly about alerting Sydneysiders to China's plight and partly about raising money from the Europeans. Seasoned organiser of Chinese events Albert Cumines, of the long established Rocks firm of King Nam Jang, recalled in the 1990s that the Chinese spectacular, which 'coincided' with the sesquicentenary, was so popular that it was repeated on a following evening. 'We sold all the tickets (and) we raised enough money for the ambulance.'

In the face of Japanese aggression, elements of Sydney's Chinese community made the closest political links they had ever had with sections of the mainstream community that condemned the Japanese. Left-wing unions supported boycotts of Japanese goods and waterside workers refused to load ships bound for Japan. Chinese seamen deserting Japan-bound ships were sheltered from the authorities. When workers refused to load pig iron on the Dalfram at Port Kembla, south of Sydney, in 1938, Fred Wong, who was a member of the Trades and Labor Council's 'Hands off China Campaign', collected truckloads of fruit and vegetables from the Sydney markets and drove them down to the striking workers. The following year Wong became the first president of the newly formed Chinese Youth League.

The Chinese Catholic Action Group assisted Chinese refugees of their faith.

Australia belatedly got the message. Many of Sydney's Chinese joined the Australian armed forces, as the Chinese war memorial in Chinatown attests. The local conditions generated by the Second World War were crucial to the slow collapse of the White Australia policy and many Chinese organised carefully to maximise their chances.

At the outbreak of the Pacific war, many Chinese seamen walked off their ships in Sydney, and after the bombing of Pearl Harbor, they deserted in droves. In 1942 a branch of the Chinese Seamen's Union was formed in Sydney, with close links to the Australian Seamen's Union and the Chinese Youth League. As well as working for better conditions for seamen, all of these organisations were involved in concealing deserters, falsifying papers and finding unobtrusive jobs.

By 1943 reluctant shippers were required to pay Chinese seamen the basic wage plus wartime bonuses. At the same time, labour shortages in Sydney encouraged others not to go to sea at all and it was officially estimated that around 500 seamen were illegally on shore. Some were jailed and deported, but more were skilfully 'disappeared' into the general community. Employers desperate for workers did not ask too many questions, and even the state was complicit, with several hundred former seamen working on the construction of Warragamba Dam between 1942 and 1944. Documents restricting work options for legitimate residents were less frequently checked, and refugees arriving from the Pacific and from New Guinea were free to work anywhere.

During and immediately after the war increasing numbers of Chinese were readily changing jobs and getting away with it, which helped build community tolerance and resistance to the immigration employment restrictions. So too did a newfound interest in Chinese cuisine, as diners took their cue from American soldiers on leave who appreciated Chinese restaurants previously ignored by non-Chinese Sydneysiders. The establishment of the People's Republic of China in 1949 also helped. There had been a concerted government effort to repatriate wartime refugees in 1947, with matching efforts by the community to hide and protect people, many of whom had by now married and settled into the local scene. This policy was overturned in 1949 as the newly elected conservative Menzies government was reluctant to send wartime illegals, seamen and newly arriving refugees into the arms of a regime it was loudly condemning.

== The end of White Australia ==
Administration of the immigration act became increasingly unpredictable, but erred on the side of leniency. Although people like Stanley Wai, of the Chinese Youth League, and Jong Ngock Bew (William Jong), a secretary of the Chinese Seamen's Union, were penalised for their political actions by discriminatory one-year renewals of their papers for many years, more experience was in the other direction.

For most, the turn of events in China was not welcome. Members of the Chinese Youth League ran through the streets with a home-made red flag with five golden stars, but only about 200 people attended the official celebration picnic in the Royal National Park, and in the cold war 1950s, many Chinese felt the chill. Contact with home was limited, and the restless travelling to and fro ceased altogether. No new immigrants came. Anyone on the left side of politics was looked on with suspicion and under constant surveillance. Arthur Gar Locke Chang, recalling that advice from China was to lie low, not march on May Day and not rock the boat, described these times as 'lonely, isolated, prosecuted and persecuted'. A few returned to support the revolution, but for most, whatever their politics, interest in staying inevitably intensified.

After 1951 Chinese students began arriving under the Colombo Plan from Singapore, Malaya and Hong Kong, and while many returned to become part of the educated elite of Southeast Asia, many stayed, married, or came back in later decades. Today this group contributes to the leadership of Sydney's Chinese community.

When the anti-Chinese tabloid Truth asked through its columns why Jap Kuan Wong[Chinese script needed], who had come to Sydney as a student in 1938 was still here in 1954, the ploy backfired. There was wide support for Jap, known as Keith Wong, who was a father of five, son of Stanley Wong, well known racing identity and a partner in Chequers Nightclub, possibly the grandest night spot in Sydney at the time.

Wong and some other high-profile Chinese, including Martin Wang, the Chinese consul until 1949, were granted citizenship in 1957 and by the following year citizenship was available to anyone with 15 years' residency. This was reduced to five years in 1966, and in 1973 to three years, the requirement for all immigrants. The White Australia policy was finally dead.

== Prosperity and suburbanisation ==
The low profile of the Chinese community in the decades following 1949 led some commentators to believe that assimilation was inevitable. In 1955 when the Glebe joss house was reopened after a fire, the Sydney Morning Herald observed that this might be the last such ceremony ever seen in Sydney. The lack of vitality of Chinatown was seen as further proof. But this was in part a result of the Chinese doing what everyone else was doing, deserting the city for the suburbs. There were pockets of Chinese in the western suburbs of Concord and Ashfield, in Kensington and Kingsford to the east and in Chatswood on the lower north shore. All of these places had some links to earlier Chinese settlements, often to older market garden areas.

And by the 1970s, with all the old reasons for avoiding investment in Sydney now gone, Chinese money was turning to Sydney real estate. The seriously rich Chen and Chan families were to the fore, with Bernard Chan, who arrived in Sydney in 1967, buying into a moribund Chinatown as the start of his portfolio of hotels, suburban shopping centres and residential buildings.

The government began funding Chinese language schools and organisations mushroomed. Traditional district societies revived and multiplied, along with organisations of Chinese academics, creative associations, homes for the elderly and children's facilities. In 1974 the Australian Chinese Community Association was set up as an umbrella body to advocate to government for the Chinese community. It was located in Mary Street in the old Chinese precinct of ... organisational headquarters. Cantonese language programs commenced on radio 2EA in 1975. Later other stations and SBS Television provided information and entertainment in Mandarin as well. Daily Chinese language newspapers grew in number and in circulation.

By the end of the decade, Dixon Street, a precinct no longer associated with the markets, received a facelift and became a pedestrian mall, complete with damen (arched entrance). At one level this was a contrived piece of 'Chinese-ing' by the City Council, but it worked. Property values rose, Chinese organisations repositioned themselves there, and everyone enjoyed visiting Chinatown for a meal. The gift of extensive Chinese Gardens in 1988 by Sydney's sister city of Guangzhou enhanced the locality. Lion dances, long since gone from the streets of Sydney, returned, and appeared in the suburbs too. Dragon boat races, first organised by the Sing Tao newspaper in 1984, became a feature of the city's calendar. The number of people who visit the various cemeteries for the Mid-Autumn and Qing Ming festivals grows annually.

In June 1989 Chinese and non-Chinese stood shoulder to shoulder in the rain in Sydney Square listening to speeches in English and Chinese, following what has become known as the 1989 Tiananmen Square protests and massacre in Beijing. Since then, immigration numbers have risen steadily, with greater numbers of Mandarin-speaking people from mainland China joining the older Cantonese-speaking community. Tensions within the Chinese community, especially from older generations of residents who felt they were being culturally swamped, have not been uncommon.

In 1996 there were 99,600 Chinese-born living in Sydney. This had risen to 146,000 by 2006. When those with a Chinese parent were added in the number rose to 292,400, and these figures do not include any of the descendants of the story told here. Areas of most dramatic population growth have been the City of Sydney and Hurstville, with growing numbers in Auburn, Ashfield, Parramatta, Ryde, Chatswood, Hornsby and Willoughby.

In 21st Century, Many Chinese students immigrate to Australia through 189 visa (Independent skilled visa) and 190 (Nominated dependent visa). Moreover, many Chinese rich-men immigrate to Australia by investor visa or investment visa.

== See also ==
- Chinese Australians
