= The Poison of Polygamy =

1909–1910 novel in Literary Chinese by Wong Shee Ping

- Cover of the first English edition, 2019
- Author: Wong Shee Ping
- Translator: Ely Finch
- Language: Classical Chinese
- Publisher: Chinese Times, Sydney University Press
- Publication date: 1909–1910
- Publication place: Australia
- English publication date: 2019
- Pages: 456 (first English edition)
- ISBN: 9781743326022

The Poison of Polygamy (Chinese: 多妻毒; pinyin: Duō Qī Dú) is a novel first published in serial form in the Chinese Times, a Chinese-language Australian newspaper, between June 1909 and December 1910. The novel was written by Wong Shee Ping, a Christian preacher and member of the newspaper's staff, and was published under the pen name Jiangxiaerlang. The novel follows a man named Huang Shangkang who travels from his village in Guangdong to work on the goldfields in Australia during the Victorian gold rush.

The novel was translated into English in 2019 and was adapted into a theatre production staged in 2023. Scholars have described the work as a social novel that argues for the modernisation of Chinese culture by criticising practices like polygamy and foot binding. The novel was likely also written to encourage the newspaper's working-class readers to abandon practices like opium smoking that wealthier Chinese-Australians viewed as harmful to the community's image.

== Plot ==
During the 1850s, Huang Shangkang lives in a village in Guangdong, China, with his wife Ma and is addicted to opium. He and his wife have been married for three years, have no children, and are struggling to pay his debts. When his elderly mother becomes ill, Ma pawns her few possessions to pay for doctors, but their remedies do not work and the old woman dies. The couple descend further into poverty until they receive a visit from Ma's cousin, who has made his fortune in the Victorian gold rush. Ma begs him for money, but as soon as her husband receives the money he wastes it on opium. The cousin offers to pay for Huang Shangkang's passage to Australia on the condition that he give up opium. He agrees and departs for Victoria.

On his voyage to Australia, Huang Shangkang befriends two men from Guangdong named Huang Chengnan and Huang Binnan. Their party of about 70 Chinese men arrives in Australia after 76 days at sea and set out on a long trek towards the goldfields. After 10 days, the group realise that they are lost. While searching for food, they are attacked by a beast described as having a bear's head and a tiger's body. They are later attacked by a group of Aboriginal Australians, but are saved by a white man named George. George directs them towards a Chinese market gardener named Chen Liang, who takes in the 12 surviving men.

In Guangdong, Ma is forced to perform all of the housework and physical labour due to her husband's absence, which causes her pain due to her bound feet. As she cannot read, she has to ask others to read the letters that her husband sends her. In Victoria, the Chinese miners eventually arrive at the goldfields and begin operating a goldmine where they employ European workers. Huang Chengnan is able to open a grocery business using the money that he earns from the mine. After six years, Huang Chengnan, Huang Binnan, and Huang Shangkang all return to China. After arriving home, Huang Shangkang informs his wife that he wishes to take a concubine. They also purchase a baby boy as an heir. Huang Shangkang begins using opium again and quickly exhausts all of the money that he earned during his time in Australia. He then decides to return to Australia, where he becomes a business partner to Huang Chengnan. He marries an eighteen-year old Chinese woman named Qiao Xi who was smuggled to Australia.

With his business nearing bankruptcy due to his continued opium use, Huang Shangkang flees Australia and returns to China with Qiao Xi and their two daughters. After they arrive back in their village, Qiao Xi begins to mistreat Ma. Ma eventually becomes pregnant, and Qiao Xi poisons Ma and smothers her newborn son. Huang Shangkang dies of grief, and his extended family decide to drown Qiao Xi as revenge for the deaths of Ma and her son. As they take Qiao Xi to a river to drown her, she instead drowns herself in a nearby pond.

== Publication history ==
The author, Wong Shee Ping, also known as Wong Yau Kung, was born in Kaiping County in the 1870s. He became a Christian preacher and eventually moved to Melbourne, where his father (who had once owned a gold mine in the town of Ballarat in Victoria, Australia) and his brother resided. He initially worked as a compositor for the Chinese-language Australian newspaper the Chinese Times, before becoming part of its editorial staff in 1910. Wong Shee Ping was a critic of the Qing dynasty and a supporter of Chinese cultural modernisation. He became the editor of the Chinese Times in 1914. In 1923 he left Australia and became a public official in the Republic of China.

The Poison of Polygamy was published in serial form in the Chinese Times between June 1909 and December 1910 in 53 instalments, with a new entry appearing approximately each week. Each instalment appeared under the pen name Jiangxiaerlang and was written largely in literary Chinese, with some expressions taken from vernacular Mandarin and from Cantonese dialects. The novel was rediscovered in 2006 by the scholar Mei-fen-Kuo. A bilingual edition of the novel was published in 2019 by the Sydney University Press, translated by Ely Finch, with chapters of commentary by Kuo and Michael Williams. The novel was adapted for the stage by the playwright Anchuli Felicia King for a 2023 joint production by the La Boite Theatre Company and the Sydney Theatre Company, directed by Courtney Stewart.

== Analysis ==
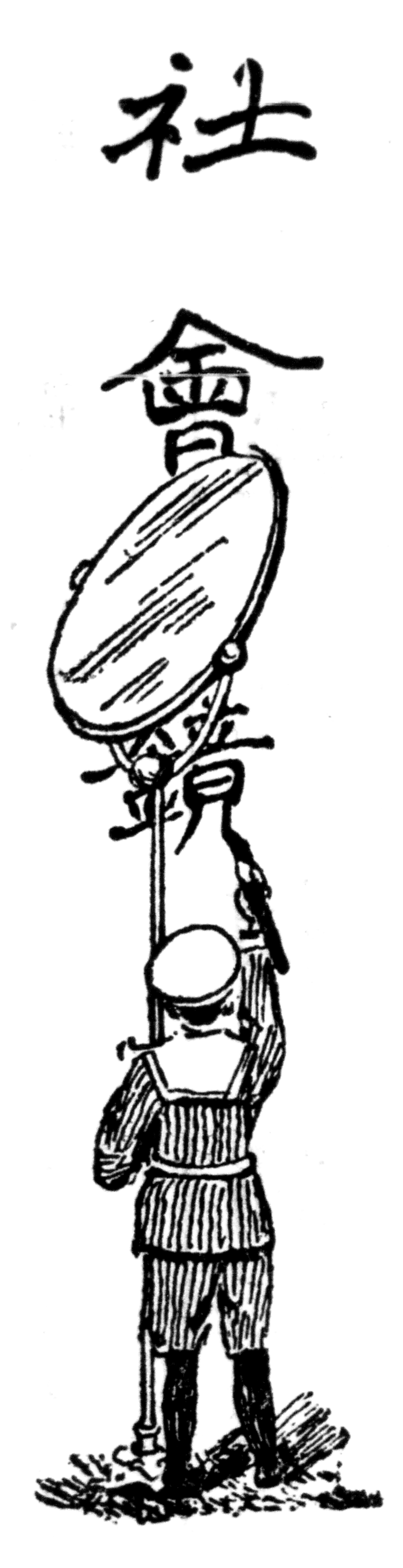
"The Social Mirror" - 社會鏡: an illustration from the Chinese Times, Melbourne, that accompanied each installment of The Poison of Polygamy

At the time Wong Shee Ping wrote The Poison of Polygamy during the early 1900s, the Chinese community was beginning to decline due to the restrictions imposed by the White Australia policy. The novel depicts the earlier gold rushes of the mid-19th century, described in the novel as "vaguely lingering memory", and likely drew on elements of Wong Shee Ping's family's own experiences. The novel shows how the Chinese diaspora migrated to Australia during the gold rush and then transitioned to new occupations in urban centres once the gold rushes ended. Around the time of the novel's publication, the Chinese-Australian community was divided between more moderate supporters of the Chinese Empire Reform Association and republicans like Wong Shee Ping who supported the revolutionary cause.

The scholars Mei-fen Kuo and Michael Williams suggest that The Poison of Polygamy was primarily a social novel written to advocate for Chinese modernisation. To the researcher Josh Stenberg, the novel's aims are "overtly propagandistic". The novel features a third-person narrator, described by Huang and Ommundsen as "intrusive and didactic", who frequently inserts social and political commentary. The novel is critical of Buddhism, Taoism, and other non-Christian spiritual practices. It also criticises traditional practices like polygamy and foot binding, and argues that women should be granted greater equality and opportunities for education. Kuo and Williams write that the novel presents the character of Ma as a victim of traditional culture and of her husband's mistreatment. The researcher Sophie Loy-Wilson characterises the novel as a "lament for the social ramifications of gold rush-era migration and Qing Empire malaise in the lives of Chinese women and children".

The researchers Zhong Huang and Wenche Ommundsen point out that during the period in which the novel was published, many wealthier Chinese-Australians blamed practices like gambling and opium smoking for a rise in anti-Chinese sentiment in Australia. They often used Chinese-language newspapers to encourage working-class Chinese-Australians to abandon these practices and assimilate into Australian society. Other Chinese-language newspapers, such as the Tung Wah Times, published similar works of fiction that criticised patriarchal traditions and practices like foot binding and polygamy. Stenberg places the novel within a broader genre of late-Qing Christian fiction that was popular both in China and in Chinese diaspora communities.

Kuo and Williams argue that the novel provides a particularly revealing portrait of poorer Chinese villages in the 19th century, particularly with regards to the position of women and the experiences of wives left behind by husbands who had migrated overseas to work. They write that the novel provides a first-hand account of migration experiences that historians had previously only examined indirectly. Scholars have also pointed out, however, that the novel includes various historical inaccuracies and anachronisms, including representations of Aboriginal Australians that have been described as offensive. To Loy-Wilson, the novel casts Chinese-Australians as "co-invaders" of indigenous lands and downplays tensions between white Australians and the Chinese community.

== See also ==
- 1910 in Australian literature
