= Chinese Times =

Chinese-language newspaper in Australia

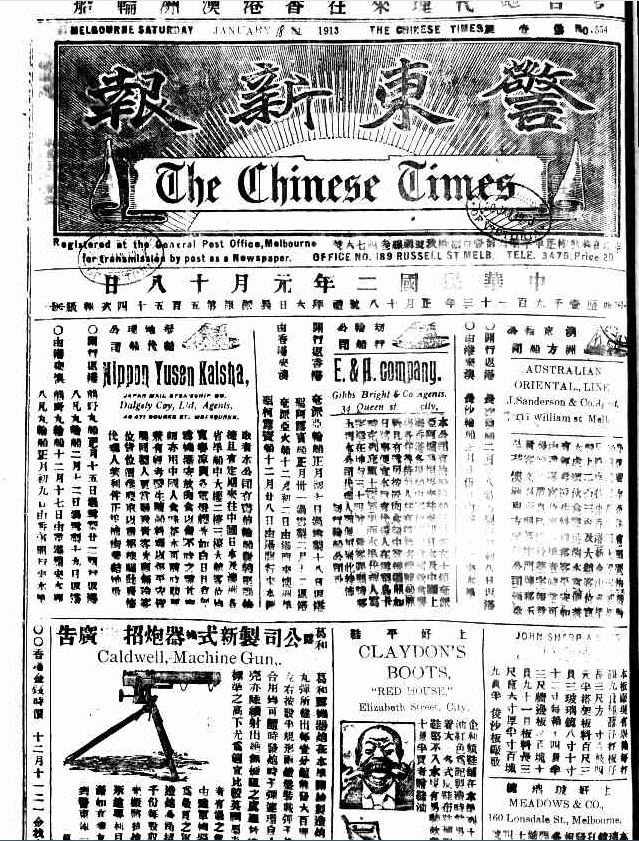
The front page of The Chinese Times, 18 January 1913

The Chinese Times was a Chinese language newspaper established in Melbourne in 1902. Its Chinese title was initially 愛國報 Aiguobao (Patriotic Newspaper, 1902–1905), later 警東新報 Jingdongxinbao (1905–1914), 平報 Pingbao (1917), 民報 Minbao (The People, 1919-1922). At the time of its establishment it was the only Chinese-language newspaper in Melbourne, and one of three in Australia (along with the Chinese Australian Herald and the Tung Wah Times, both published in Sydney). From 1919 it was the official newspaper of the Kuomintang in Australia. It moved to Sydney in 1922, where it continued to publish until 1949.

The first edition appeared on 5 February 1902. It appeared weekly, initially on Wednesdays but from February 1905 on Saturdays. It ceased publication on a few occasions, including in 1907, between 1915 and 1919, and between 1920 and 1922.

== Editorship ==
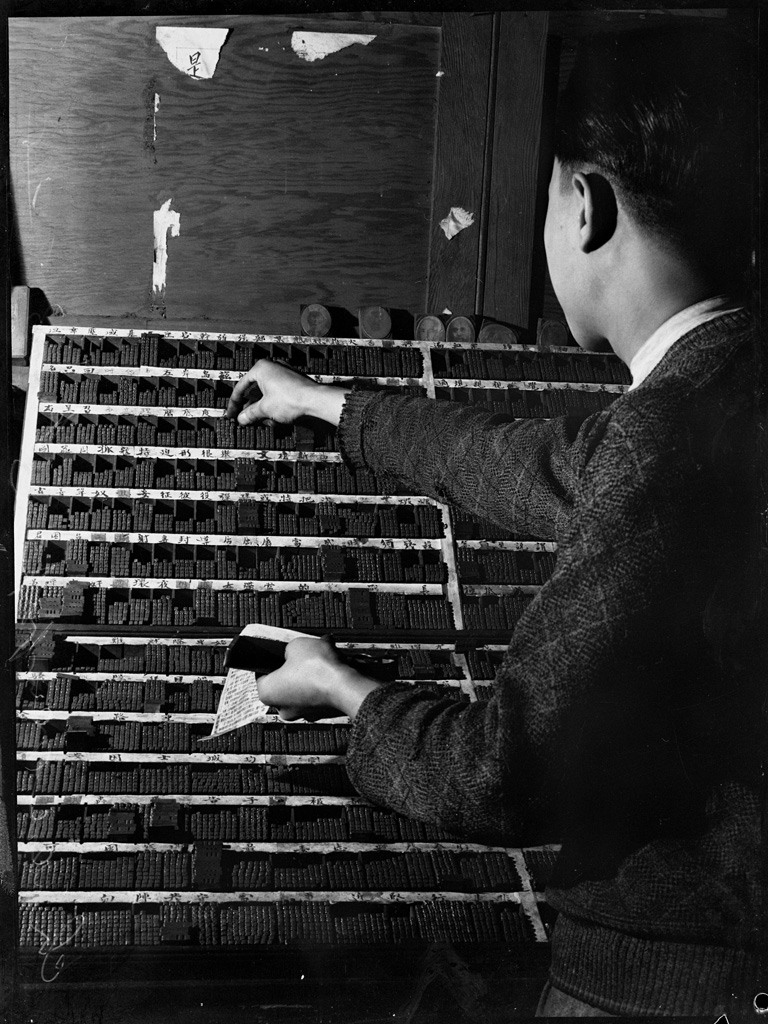
Employee of the Chinese Times Newspaper handpicking Chinese characters to print press, 17 September 1941.

The founding editor and owner was 鄭祿 Zheng Lu, also known as Thomas Chang Luke. Zheng had been editor of the Tung Wah Times between 1899 and 1901 but his republican views became a source of tension and he left to start his own newspaper.

In 1905 Zheng sold the Chinese Times to Ruan Jianzhai. The paper closed temporarily in 1907 owing to financial difficulties. In 1908 it was revived by the Chinese Empire Reform Association as an organ for the republican movement, with Lew Goot-chee (Liu Dihuan) and later Wong Shee Ping (Wong Yue-kung) acting as editors. In 1919, the paper was transferred to the Melbourne branch of the Kuomintang. In 1922 the paper moved to Sydney, initially with Wong as editor. It continued to publish until the end of the Second World War.

== Politics ==
Your esteemed newspaper raises the banner of democratic government; its influence spreads among overseas Chinese, and its reputation and achievements are distinguished. Now that it has been reorganised, renewed day by day and month by month, and moved to a better location, its scale is more complete. May it exert its spirit and propagate the doctrine, so that the Five-Power Constitution may be realised and the Three Principles of the People fulfilled. Through the success of its writing, may the nation be blessed and the people benefit. May your newspaper’s future develop without limit, and may its destiny endure through the ages. I respectfully congratulate Sydney’s Min Bao on its launch.

— Sun Yat-sen, on the relaunching of the Chinese Times in Sydney.

The Chinese Times was critical of the Ch’ing establishment, encouraged its readers to support reform, and according to historian Morag Loh “by 1910 was openly republican”. From 1919 it was the official publication of the Kuomintang in Australia. It was frequently critical of the Tung Wah Times, which supported a constitutional monarchy.

As well as encouraging its readers to support the republican cause back in China, the newspaper documented the discrimination faced by Chinese people living in Australia and the effects of the White Australia Policy, which had come into effect in 1901.

== Publication of The Poison of Polygamy ==
In 1909 and 1910, the Chinese Times published, in serial form, The Poison of Polygamy by Wong Shee Ping, the first Chinese-language novel to be published in Australia and in the West. A bilingual edition of the novel, reproducing the original Classical Chinese and an English translation by Ely Finch, was published by Sydney University Press in 2019.

== Digitisation ==
The National Library of Australia and State Library of Victoria digitised the Chinese Times as part of the Chinese Heritage of Australian Federation project. The digitised copies span 1902 to 1922 and can be accessed via Trove. There are few known remaining copies from after 1922, when the newspaper's editorial office moved to Sydney.
