= Wong Shee Ping =

Chinese writer, activist and preacher

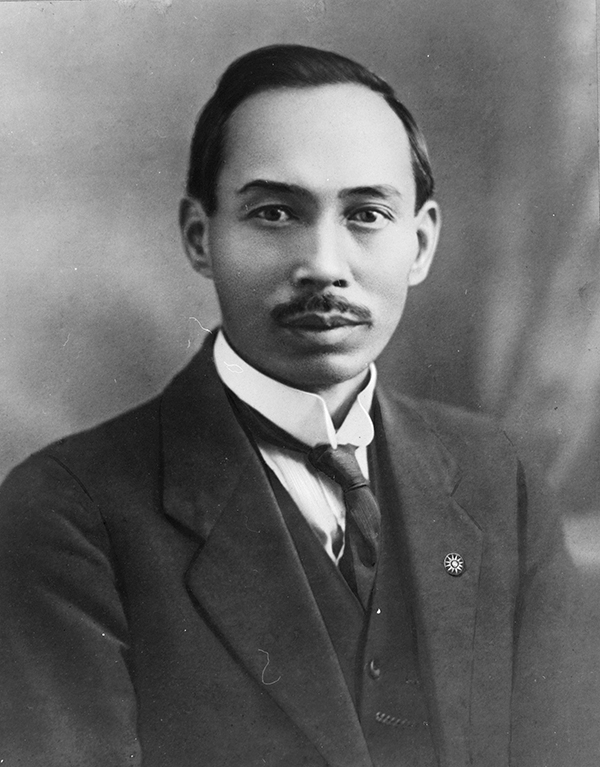
- Wong, c. 1915
- Born: c. 1875–1878; Kaiping, Guangdong, China
- Died: 1948; Kaiping, Guangdong, China
- Occupations: author, newspaper editor, political organiser, preacher

Wong Shee Ping (c. 1875–1878 – 1948), 黃樹屏, also known as Wong Yau Kung 黃右公/黃又公, was a Chinese writer, newspaper editor, political activist and Christian preacher.

== Biography ==
=== Early life ===
Wong was born in Kaiping. His Kuomintang membership card gave his birth year as 1875, while his marriage certificate listed it as 1878. His father had business interests in Australia, including a gold mine in Ballarat, and spent extended periods of time away while Wong and his siblings remained in Guangdong with their mother.

=== Move to Australia ===
In 1908, Wong arrived in Melbourne, where his brother was running a Chinese restaurant. Wong took a job as a compositor with the Chinese Times newspaper before joining its editorial staff and becoming editor of the paper in 1914. With fellow republican Lew Goot-Chee he established the Young China League in Melbourne in 1911. He later moved to Sydney, where he was editor of the Chinese Republic News in 1919 and 1920 and a revived Chinese Times from 1920.

During the 1910s, Wong travelled to South Australia and Western Australia, to preach and to help establish local branches of the Kuomintang. The Chinese diaspora community played an important role in raising funds and support for the Kuomintang during this period.

=== Publication of The Poison of Polygamy ===
In June 1909, the Chinese Times published the first installment of "a social novel", The Poison of Polygamy. The novel was written in Classical Chinese and was published in 53 installments in 1909 and 1910. Although the novel was originally published anonymously, historians Mei-fen Kuo and Michael Williams and translator Ely Finch identified Wong as its author while preparing the first English translation of the novel. Wong was a member of the newspaper's editorial staff at the time the story was published. The novel is set in Guangdong, Melbourne, and the goldfields during the Victorian gold rushes and includes commentary on Chinese and Australian society, the White Australia policy, women's rights, marriage, and other social issues. It is the earliest known Chinese-language novel published in Australia, and possibly in the West.

Finch's English translation of The Poison of Polygamy was published by Sydney University Press in 2019. It was adapted for the stage by playwright Anchuli Felicia King for a joint 2023 production by La Boite Theatre in Brisbane and the Sydney Theatre Company.

A second novel by Wong was serialised in the Chinese Times and the Chinese Republican News in 1917 and 1919, under titles that have been translated as "World of Robbers" (in the Chinese Times) and "The Detective's Shadow" (Chinese Republican News). An advertisement for this second novel in the Chinese Times confirmed Wong was the author of The Poison of Polygamy.

=== Marriage and children ===
In January 1923 Wong married Ellen Louisa (Cissie) Sam in Melbourne. Their daughter Maude Florence (Bonnie) Shee Ping was born later the same year. He was also survived by a wife and child in Kaiping in 1948.

=== Later life ===
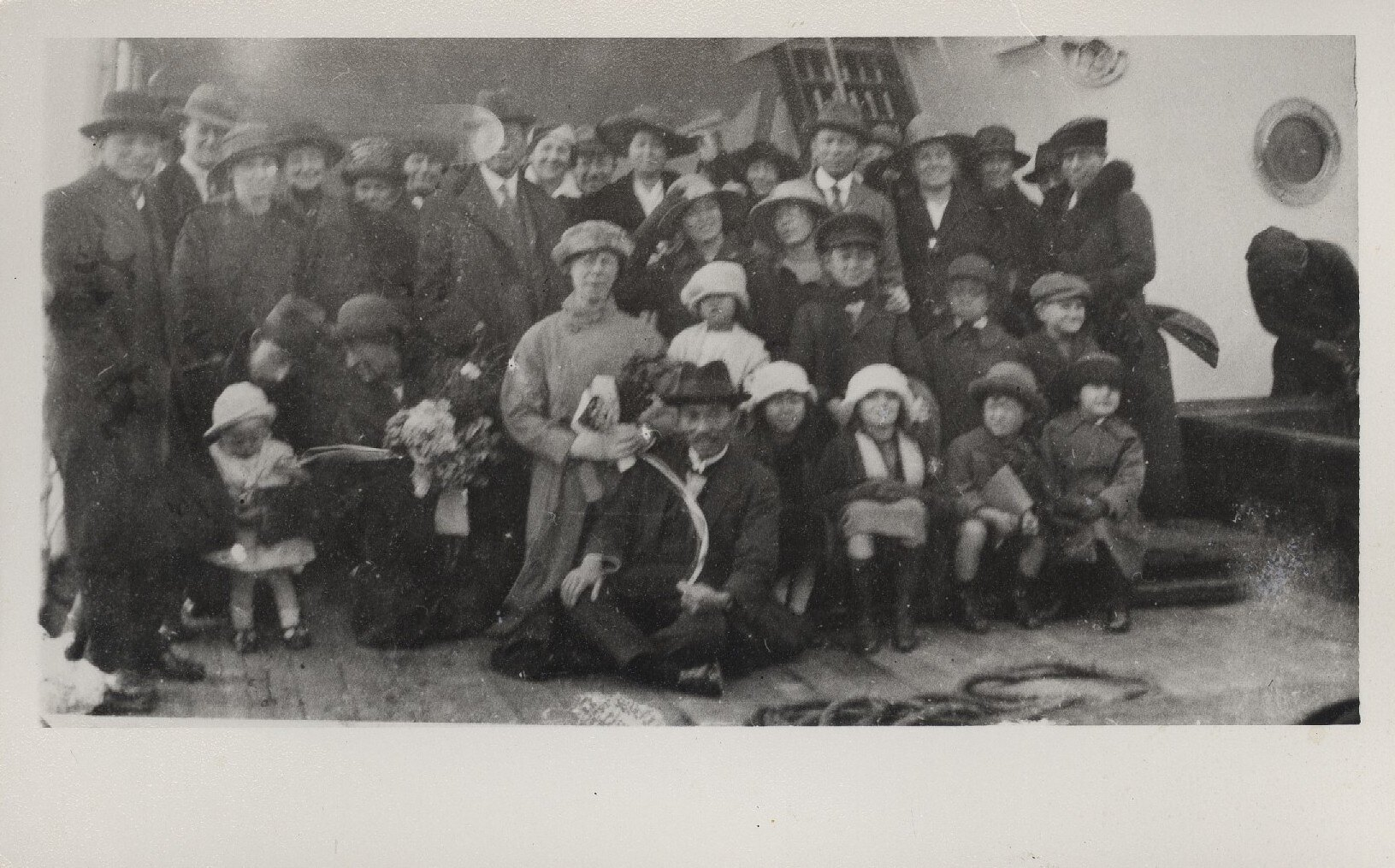
Photograph of a group of passengers taken on a ship. Wong Shee Ping is sitting in the middle, c. 1930s.

In 1924, Wong returned to China to represent Australasia at the first national conference of the Kuomintang. He was appointed by Sun Yatsen to the party's Central Propaganda Committee and became involved with the Hong Kong Morning Post. Later in the 1920s he held various provincial posts in the Republican government of China, and was a member of its Overseas Chinese Affairs Commission.

It is not known whether he intended to return to Australia, or whether he kept in touch with his wife Cissie after his departure. There are few known records of his activities after 1931. He died in his home county Kaiping in 1948, aged in his early 70s.

== Political and religious views ==
Wong was a member of the Kuomintang and was active in promoting the republican cause in the Chinese community in Australia. He was a Christian and in The Poison of Polygamy advocated for an end to folk religion, polygamy, and other traditional practices. The novel also suggests that he was well versed in Confucianism.

Wong also held feminist views and advocated for women's education and political rights. In 1921, he secured permission from Sun Yatsen to waive membership fees for female members of the Australian branches of the Kuomintang, and to allow women to join party committees.

== See also ==
- The Poison of Polygamy
- Chinese Australians
- Overseas Chinese
- Chinese Times
