= Morag Loh =

Australian writer (1935–2019)

- Loh from a 1981 newspaper
- Born: Morag Jeanette Foster; 3 March 1935; Melbourne, Victoria, Australia
- Died: 7 February 2019 (aged 83); Melbourne, Victoria, Australia
- Occupation: Writer
- Spouse: Timothy Loh (m. 1958)

Morag Jeanette Foster (3 March 1935 – 7 February 2019) was an Australian writer, specializing in children's literature and Australian history.

== Early life ==
Loh was born in Melbourne and attended the University of Melbourne. Before 1974, she was a teacher.

== Career ==
=== Books by Morag Loh ===
- The Immigrants (1977), with Wendy Lowenstein
- Growing Up in Richmond (1979)
- With Courage in their Cases (1980)
- Children in Australia: An Outline History (1981), with Sue Fabian
- The Changemakers: Ten Significant Australian Women (1983), with Sue Fabian
- Stories and Storytellers from Indo-China (1985)
- Australian Children through 200 Years (1985), with Sue Fabian
- Survival and Celebration: An Insight into the Lives of Chinese Immigrant Women, European Women Married to Chinese and Their Female Children in Australia from 1856 to 1986 (1986), co-edited with Christine Wu Ramsay
- Dinky Di: The Contributions Of Chinese Immigrants And Australians Of Chinese Descent To Australia's Defence Forces And War Efforts 1899–1988 (1988), with Judith Winternitz
- Left-wing Ladies: The Union of Australian Women in Victoria, 1950–1998 (2000), with Sue Fabian.

=== Children's (picture) books by Morag Loh ===
- The Kinder Hat (1985), with Donna Rawlins, illustrator
- Tucking Mummy In (1987), with Donna Rawlins, illustrator
- Grandpa and Ah Gong (1995), with Xiangyi Mo, illustrator

Loh also wrote plays, including Snail and the Hare (1983), Wu Sung Fights the Tiger (1983), Glimpses of Richmond (1983), Tombolas Go Historical (1985) and Right Royal Panto (1986). She said of her historical projects on immigration in Australia, "It is really an attempt to improve communication in Australian society. If it also educates people then that is fine, and certainly it is meant to be entertaining." She spoke at literary festivals, to community groups and schoolchildren.

=== Chinese Australian work by Morag Loh ===
Loh, Morag, John Egge: a champion of the rivers, Hemisphere, 28 (1), 1983, pp. 35–39.

Loh, Morag, 'You're my diamond, mum!': Some thoughts on women married to immigrants from China in Victoria from the 18508 to the 1920, Oral History Association of Australia Journal, 1984, Issue 6, p. 3–10.

Loh, Morag, 'Victoria and a catalyst for Western and Chinese Medicine', RHSV Journal 1985, 56(3):38–46.

Loh, Morag and Grant, J., Sojourners and settlers: Chinese in Victoria 1848–1985, Melbourne: Victorian Government China Advisory Committee, 1985.

Loh, Morag and Ramsay, Christine, Survival and celebration: an insight into the lives of Chinese immigrant women, European women married to Chinese and their female children in Australia from 1856 to 1986, Melbourne: M. Loh and C. Ramsay, 1986.

Loh, Morag, "Historical overview of Chinese migration", in Hanks, Peter (ed) and Perry, Andrew (ed). The Chinese in Australia: papers from the conference held on 19 March 1988. Clayton, Vic: Centre for Migrant and Intercultural Studies, Monash University, 1988, p1-6. (Working Papers on Migrant and Intercultural Studies).

Loh, Morag, "Chinese-Australian true blue Diggers", Focus, Jun 1988, p3.

Loh, Morag, "Thomas Coto [Series of two parts] Part 1: From seafarer to successful farmer, Gippsland Heritage Journal, v.3, no.2, 1988: 11–14.

Loh, Morag, "Thomas Coto [Series of two parts] Part 2: Adaptable immigrant: exemplary citizen", Gippsland Heritage Journal, no.6, June 1989: 40–43.

Loh, Morag, "Rough road to equality: attitudes to Chinese migration 1847/ 1988", Magazine (Chinese Association of Victoria), 1989: 54–59.

Loh, Morag, Chinese Anzacs: the launch of Dinky-Di, Focus for a Multicultural Australia, n7, Oct 1989, p2.

Loh, Morag, "The Chinese Times 1902–1922", La Trobe Library Journal, Vol. 13, No. 53, Oct 1994: 12–16. [online]

Loh, Morag. "An outpost of the Chinese medical tradition: the practice of Thomas Chong, Bairnsdale", Gippsland Heritage Journal, no.18, June 1995: 2–7.

Morag Loh, "Fighting uphill: Australians of Chinese descent and the defence forces, 1899–1951", in Ryan, Jan (ed). Chinese in Australia and New Zealand: a multidisciplinary approach. New Delhi: New Age International, 1995, p[59]-66.

Morag Loh, Grandpa and Ah Gong (1995), with Xiangyi Mo, illustrator, South Melbourne, Vic.: Hyland House, 1995.

=== Awards ===
Loh's study of Chinese-Australian history was funded in part by a grant from the Australia–China Council. Her children's book, Grandpa and Ah Gong, won the 1995 Young Readers/Picture Book award from The Family Therapy Associations of Australia. In 2008 she was added to the Victorian Honour Roll of Women.

== Personal life ==
Morag Foster married surgeon Timothy Loh in 1958. She died in 2019, aged 83 years, in Melbourne.
