= Wong Ah Sat =

Chinese-Australian merchant

Wong Ah Sat (黃實) (also known as Wong Sat) was a Chinese Australian gold digger, farmer, and merchant.

== Early life ==
Wong Ah Sat was born in Canton, China, in approximately 1837. He arrived in New South Wales, Australia in 1857. Little is known about his life and where he resided, until he married. Although, it appears he was trading in the Bathurst area since the 1860s (his account books show Chinese customers, and frequent provisions of credit, based in Bathurst). By 1864, he was on the Tuena goldfields (located between Bathurst and Goulburn, NSW). His marriage certificate to Amelia Hackney states: Usual town of residence: Tuena. Occupation: gold digger. He died in Bolong on 23 April 1916, and was buried in a Bolong private cemetery (his wife Amelia, and son Henry, were later buried with him).

== Marriage to Amelia Hackney ==
Between 1857 and 1864, Ah Sat Wong met Amelia Hackney (the daughter of prosperous and well-educated family from Manchester, England, involved in the drapery trade). It was usual for European women to trade with Chinese retailers, social customs frowned upon anything more. Regardless, "family legend states that when the couple married in Goulburn on 19 March 1864, they did so with Amelia's brothers in hot pursuit of the couple."

Shortly after they settled in the gold mining town of Tuena (approximately 70 kilometres south west of Bathurst), where they conducted butchery and general business selling Chinese and European goods to the locals. While in Tuena, Amelia gave birth to five of their children. In 1875, the Wongs moved south to the predominantly Irish and Scottish migrant settlement - Fullerton/Bolong (near Crookwell, New South Wales), where Amelia gave birth to another four of their children. Wong Sat was naturalised in 1879, allowing him to purchase approximately 4,000 acres, the Wongs used the property to raise sheep and establish a general store to supply the local community of farmers and graziers.

== Wong family store ==
The Wong family store supplied a range of goods from Australia and overseas, from preserved fruit picked from the family's orchard to violin strings imported from Germany. When Ah Sat died in 1916, the Wong family closed and locked the store, with much of its contents within: original shop fittings, a variety of merchandise, account books and order notes. In doing so, the Wong family created an unintentional time-capsule, giving an insight to better understand how Australian rural stores sustained their communities by providing access to merchandise from across the world and much needed credit in hard times.

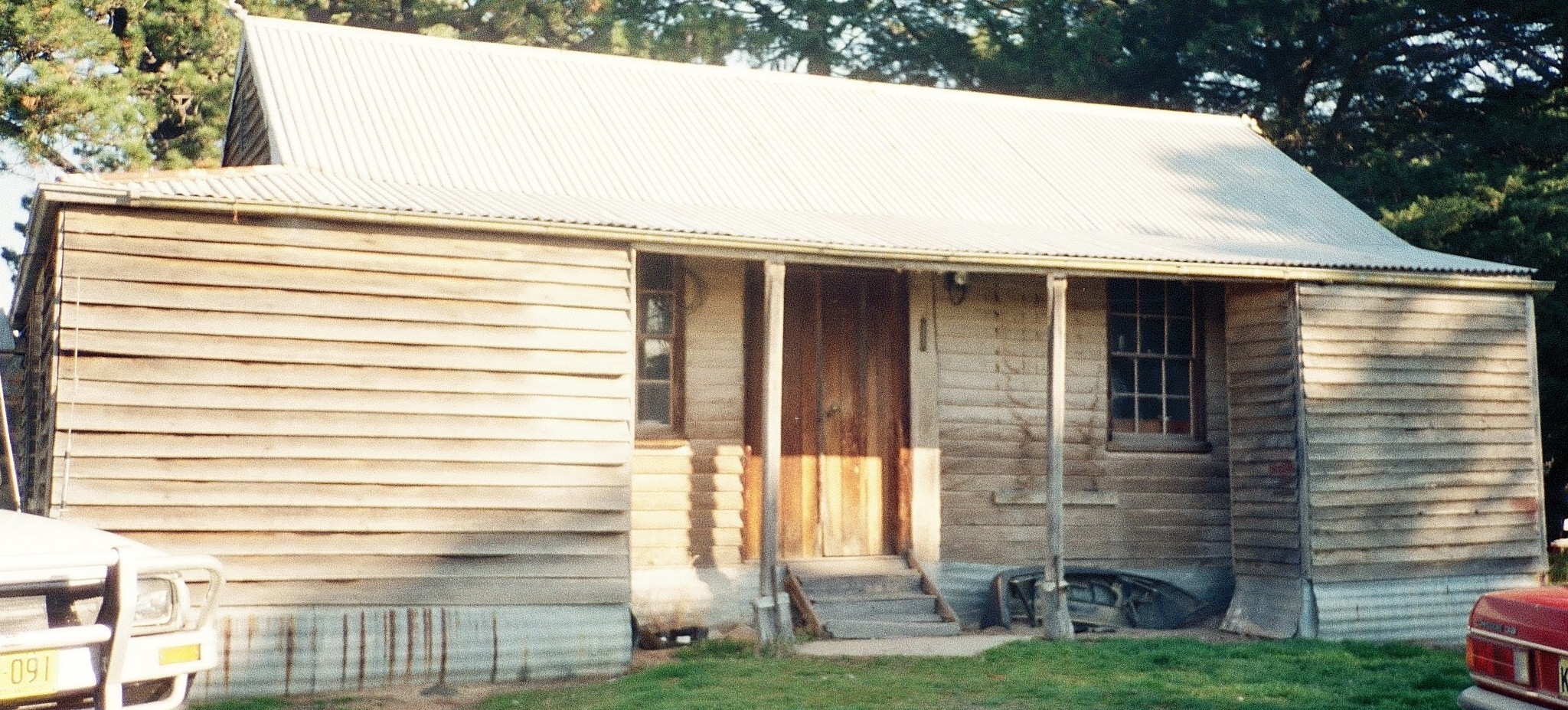
Wong family store, Bolong, NSW

The contents and fittings of the Wong family store provide examples of aesthetic significance in the design, packaging and the manufacture of a late nineteenth century consumables and Chinese material culture. They also provide a tangible research tool for historians to explore the culture and politics of the Europeans and Chinese in Australia, which has alluded to contradictions to the omnipresent anti-Chinese attitudes in late nineteenth century Australia that manifested themselves in the Lambing Flat riots and racists colonial legislation and the acceptance and assimilation of Chinese families in many regional communities.

The Wong family store collection was presented to the Powerhouse Museum by Robert Wong in 2003.

== Amelia Eve & Henry ==
Along with the many artifacts associated with the Wong store, a large number of photographs were also donated to the Powerhouse Museum. The photographs were taken by two of Ah Sat & Amelia's children: Ameilia Eve Hackney Wong and Henry Hackney Wong (both were enthusiastic amateur photographers). The photographs they created include many portraits posing (well-dressed) in the rural landscape: mainly informal, outdoor portraits and rural scenes. These photographs offer a rare glimpse into the Wong family's appearance, and personal effects.

Descendant of Wong Ah Sat: Max Brady: social activist, who opposed the extreme right wing election platform of One Nation Party.
