= Chinese Australian Herald =

Chinese-language Australian newspaper (1894–1923)

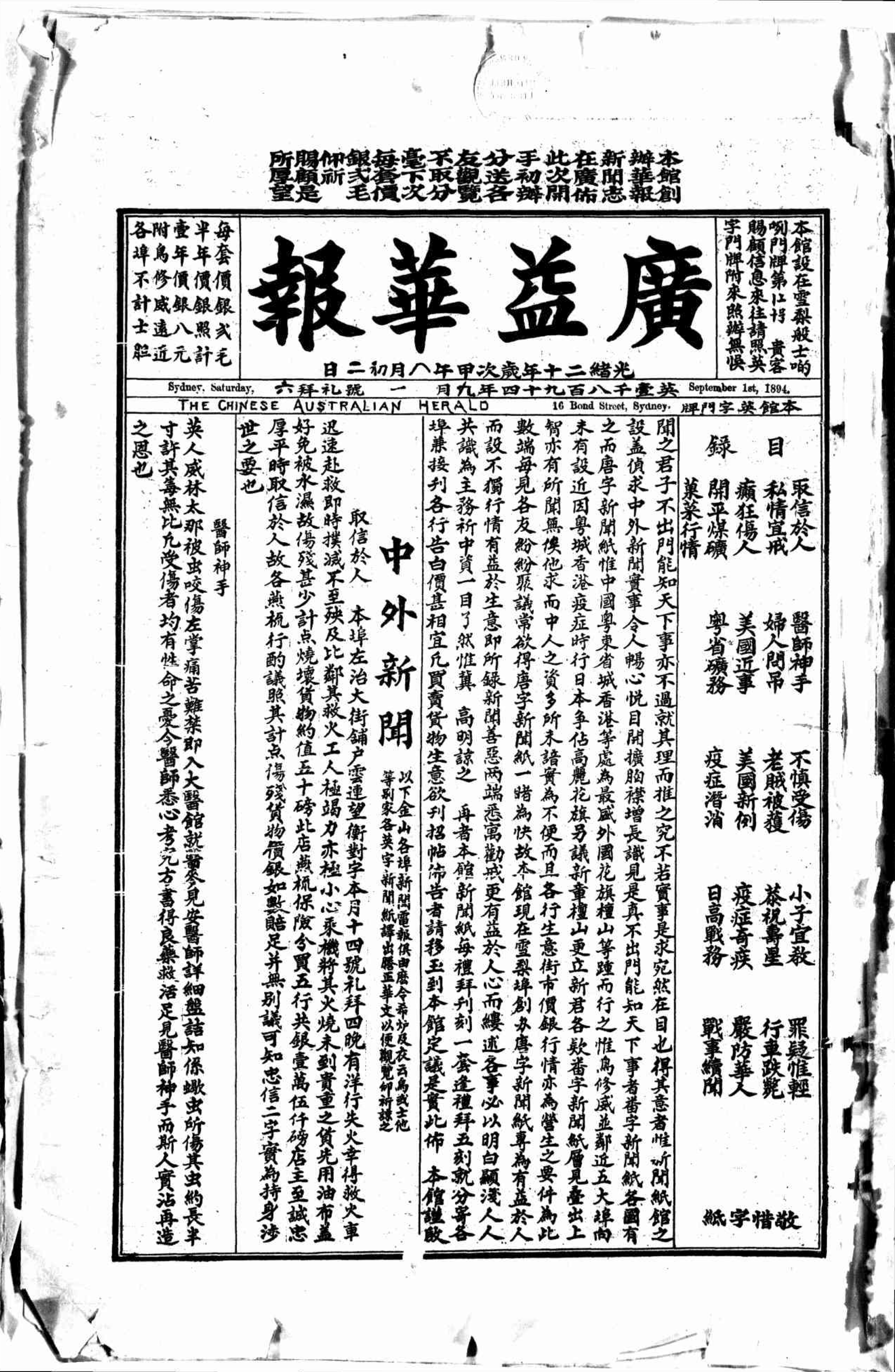
- First issue of the Chinese Australian Herald, published 1 September 1894
- Founded: 1894
- Ceased publication: 1923
- Language: Chinese
- City: Sydney
- Country: Australia

Chinese name
- Traditional Chinese: 廣益華報
Transcriptions
Standard Mandarin
- Hanyu Pinyin: Guǎngyì huábào
Yue: Cantonese
- Jyutping: gwong2jik1 waa4bou3

The Chinese Australian Herald (Chinese: 廣益華報; pinyin: Guǎngyì huábào) was a Chinese-language newspaper published in Australia between 1894 and 1923. It was the first Chinese-language newspaper in Australia with a national circulation. The bilingual editors Lee Caizhang and Sun Johnson founded the newspaper with support from the businessmen James Alexander Philp and George Arthur Down. It was published weekly and reached a peak circulation of around 1000 copies, including distribution in London, parts of Asia, and the Pacific Islands.

The newspaper acted as a bridge between white Australians and the Chinese community during its early years. The paper often published articles contrasting Australian and Chinese customs, encouraging its Chinese-speaking readers to assimilate with Australian society. It also encouraged political activism and civic participation. While the paper initially supported efforts to reform rather than overthrow the Qing dynasty in China, it eventually shifted towards support for the revolutionary cause in the years leading up to the 1911 Revolution. In its later years the paper became more critical of Western imperialism and the treatment of Chinese Australians. The paper published its final issue in August 1923.

== Publication history ==
=== Foundation and early years ===
The Chinese Australian Herald was founded by the bilingual editors Lee Caizhang (李彩章) and Sun Johnson (孫俊臣), working alongside two European businessmen named James Alexander Philp and George Arthur Down. Philp and Down formed a company to operate the newspaper, Down, Philp and Co. While another short-lived Chinese-language newspaper titled The Chinese Advertiser had been published on the Victorian goldfields in the 1850s, the Chinese Australian Herald was the first Chinese-language newspaper to achieve a national circulation. It was written in vernacular Chinese rather than the formal literary Chinese to appeal to less educated readers. The paper cost two pence per issue, or four shillings and four pence for a six month subscription and eight shillings for a year-long subscription. It was published weekly, with each issue consisting of eight pages. It published its first issue on 1 September 1894.

In 1896 Sun became the paper's sole editor after the death of Lee. He joined the paper's operating company, which was renamed Down, Philp and Johnson. The paper had purchased Australia's first typesetting machine for Chinese print the previous year, and by the end of 1896 it had begun to print the newspaper using typesetting rather than stencils. It also began using telegrams to reprint stories from other newspapers and from overseas. By late 1896 it had expanded its circulation throughout Australia and the Pacific islands, and the following year it started to be distributed in Melbourne, Brisbane, and London, reaching a circulation of 800 copies. By 1900 it was also distributed in China, the Philippines, and Java. At its peak, the newspaper had a circulation of up to 1000 copies.

The paper was supported financially by advertising, mostly taken out by Australian companies, and by the sale of imported goods. It emphasised reporting on fruit and vegetable prices, allowing it to develop a sizeable readership among Sydney's large population of Chinese fruit traders. As the paper did not employ journalists of its own, in its early years it largely contained translations of stories that had been published in other newspapers. Eventually it encouraged readers to contribute stories from their own local communities. The newspaper also developed a close relationship with the Lin Yik Tong (聯益堂), a community association led by the businessman W. R. G. Lee (李益徽).

=== Federation era ===
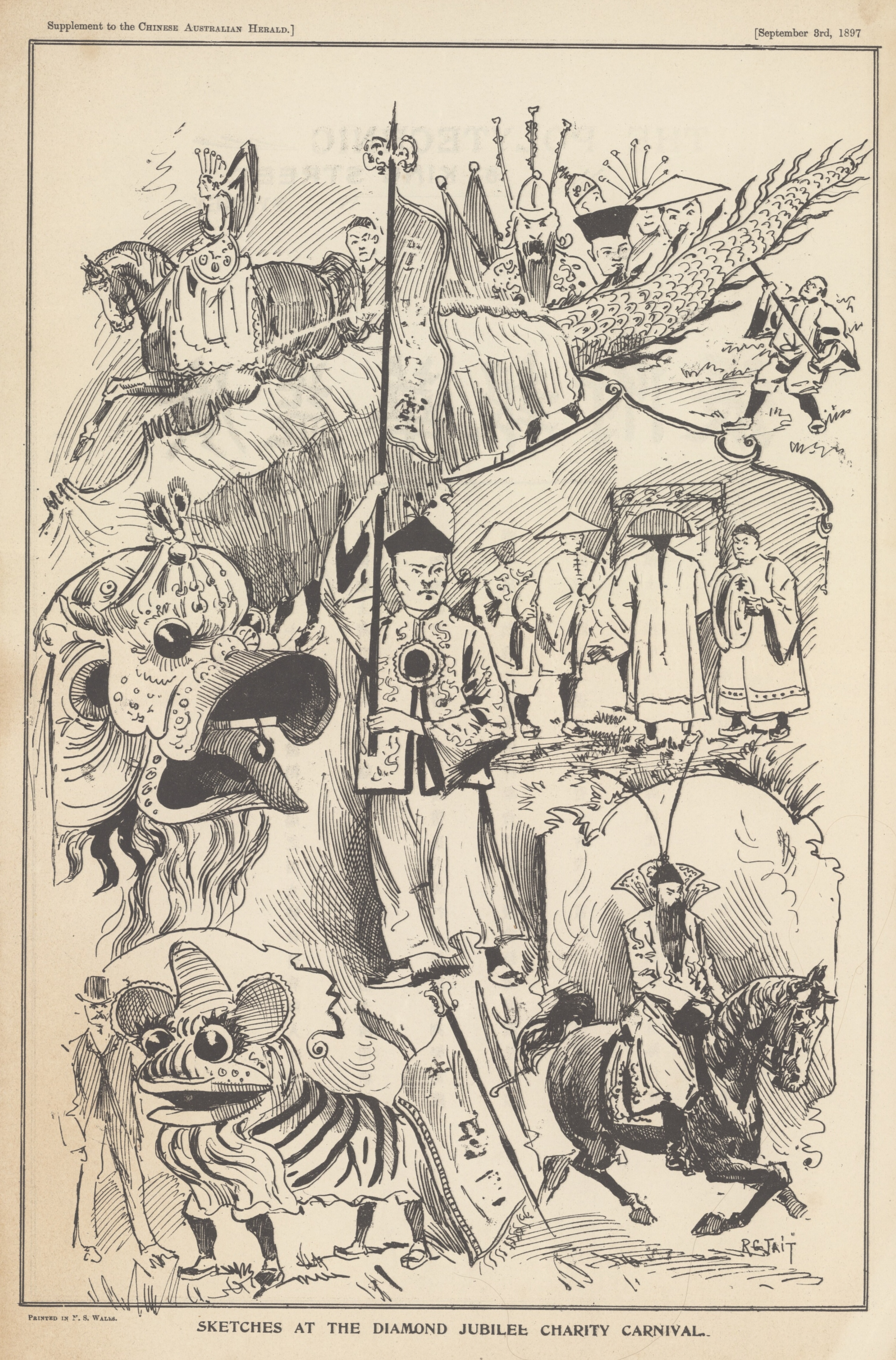
Illustration published in the Chinese Australian Herald of the community's procession at the 1897 Diamond Jubilee Carnival

In 1897 the Chinese Australian Herald helped to coordinate and attract funding for a Chinese procession at the Diamond Jubilee Carnival; the procession led to widespread positive coverage of the Chinese community. The newspaper worked with the Lin Yik Tong to host another carnival soon after. The English-language press once again advertised and responded positively to the event. Mei-fen Kuo (郭美芬), a scholar of Chinese-Australian history, writes that this episode reflected the growing role of Sun and the Chinese Australian Herald in acting as a bridge between the Chinese community and white Australian society.

The Chinese Australian Herald frequently reported on differences between Australian and Chinese culture to help its readers better understand Western habits. It encouraged readers to adopt Western practices and routines, such as the observance of the Sabbath, to show respect for local culture and demonstrate the Chinese community's assimilation. The paper continued to frequently praise Western culture and Western education, but also criticised anti-Chinese sentiment and campaigned for better treatment of the Chinese community. The paper endorsed candidates who had condemned anti-Chinese racism in the 1897 Australasian Federal Convention election. It also promoted democratic values and civic participation, often framing them in terms of Confucian values.

Kuo describes the political ideology of the Chinese Australian Herald during this period as "complex". The paper supported Australian federation and the formation of a more independent Australian state but was critical of the emerging national government's poor treatment of the Chinese community. Following a 1900 outbreak of plague in Sydney's Chinese community, the newspaper protested the government's response to the outbreak and promoted Chinese nationalism. It was generally supportive of the Qing dynasty reformers in its early years but was not nearly as vocal as the rival Tung Wah Times and the affiliated Chinese Empire Reform Association (CERA) in its support for the Emperor. In 1900 the paper published an essay attacking the CERA for being more focused on the authority of the Chinese emperor than on cultivating true democracy. Kuo writes that the newspaper's ideology reflects "the ambivalence of many Western-educated Chinese who admired Australian political systems and values yet also felt disempowered and disenfranchised in the process of building a new Australia".

By 1900 the newspaper had shifted towards emphatic support for democracy in China, although it stopped short of supporting revolution. It continued to move towards support of the revolutionary cause, publishing a piece in 1901 praising the revolutionaries and criticising the Qing dynasty. The paper's coverage of Australian politics became more pessimistic amidst the emergence of the White Australia policy, but the Tung Wah Times generally showed more concern about the policy.

By 1905 after the formation of the Anti-Chinese and Asiatic League in Australia, the paper joined other Chinese community associations and newspapers in taking a more active stance against Western imperialism and the White Australia policy. The paper joined the Tung Wah Times in supporting a global anti-American boycott in protest of the Chinese Exclusion Act. In late 1905 the newspaper reversed its previous position and published an article strongly criticising both imperialism and Western society. Kuo observes that from as early as 1898, after the Chinese community had been excluded from political participation in Australian federation, the Chinese Australian Herald's coverage featured an ever-increasing level of alienation and disappointment at the community's worsening treatment.

=== Dissolution and legacy ===
The newspaper's final issue was published on 25 August 1923. Almost 1500 issues of the newspaper were published in total, which have been digitised by the National Library of Australia and made available on Trove.
