= John Shying =

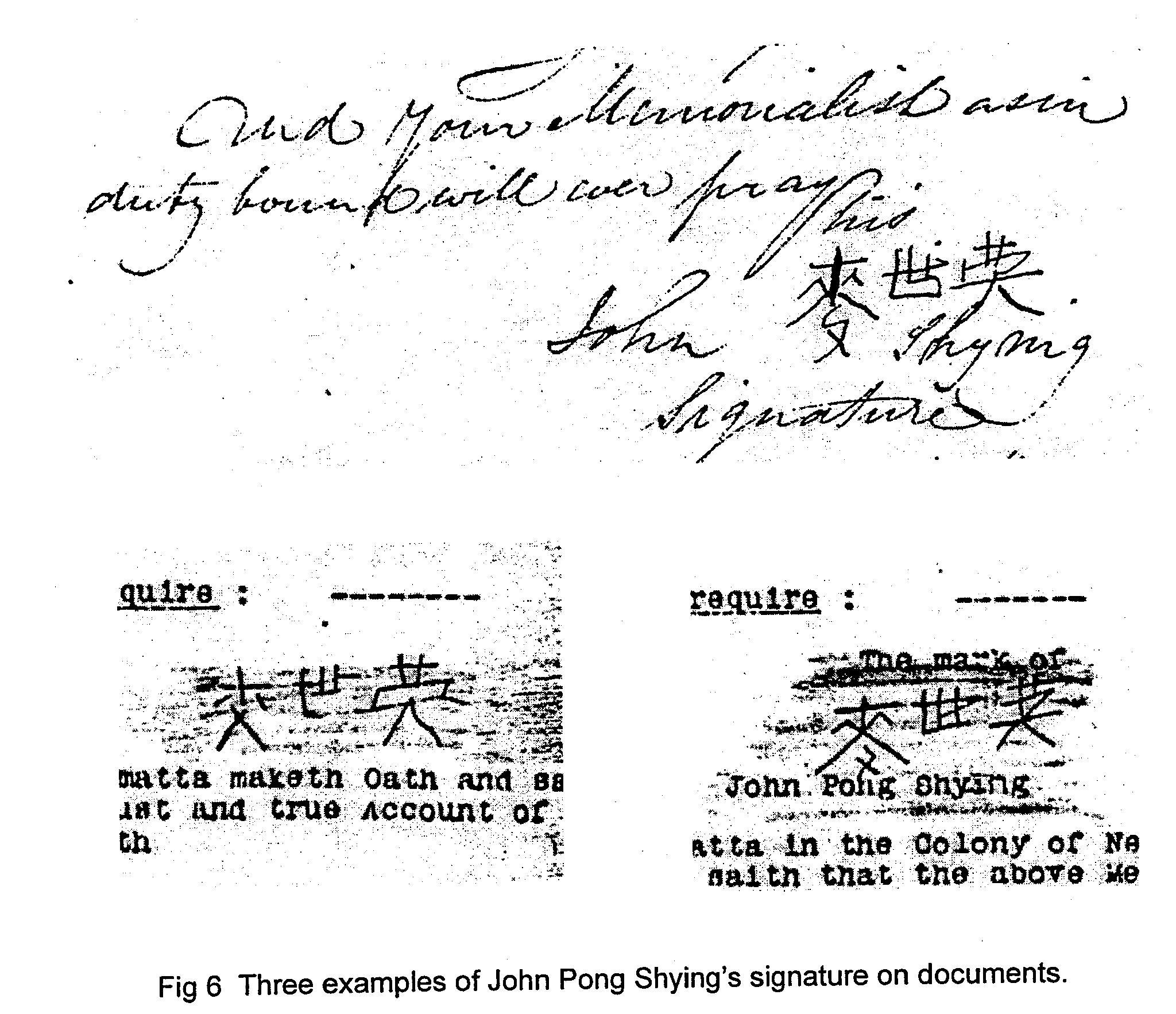
Three examples of Mak's signature

John Pong Shying (Chinese: 麥世英; Jyutping: Mak^{6} Sai^{3} Jing^{1}; b. ca. 1796, Canton, China) was the first known Chinese born settler to Australia, arriving in 1818 (date and place of death is actually unknown - the quoted date is that of John Sheen whose DNA has been shown to be different. Descendants are still trying to place his movements after 1844). He was known by many names, including Mak Sai Ying (麥世英, 麦世英, Mai Shi Ying), Mak Sai Pang (麥世鵬, 麦世鹏), Mark Opong (麥阿鵬, 麦阿鹏), and (reputedly but contrary to DNA evidence) also John Sheen.

Arriving via the Laurel in February 1818, he landed at Port Jackson.

He worked as a carpenter, living with John Blaxland on his Newington Estate. After three years, he worked at Elizabeth Farm for Elizabeth Macarthur, the pastoralist.

He married Sarah Jane Thompson (birth: about 1802, United Kingdom death: 27 March 1836, Parramatta) on 3 February 1823 in St John's Church of England, Parramatta. They had four sons: John James Shying (1823–1885), George Hugh Shying (1826–1893), James Henry Shying (1828–1891), Thomas Jones Shying (1830–1894).

It is believed a linen press, made for Elizabeth MacArthur (in 1824), still exists, and is on display at Milton House museum. The item may have been made without nails. The bookkeepers entry of payment still exists.

Shying returned to China for five years, from 1831 to 1836. He may have worked as a port liaison. He returned to Sydney, on the death of his first wife. The First Opium War began two years later. During this time, land he negotiated for from the NSW Colony had been allocated elsewhere. Sarah had a letter from the Attorney General of NSW explaining why the land had been re allocated.

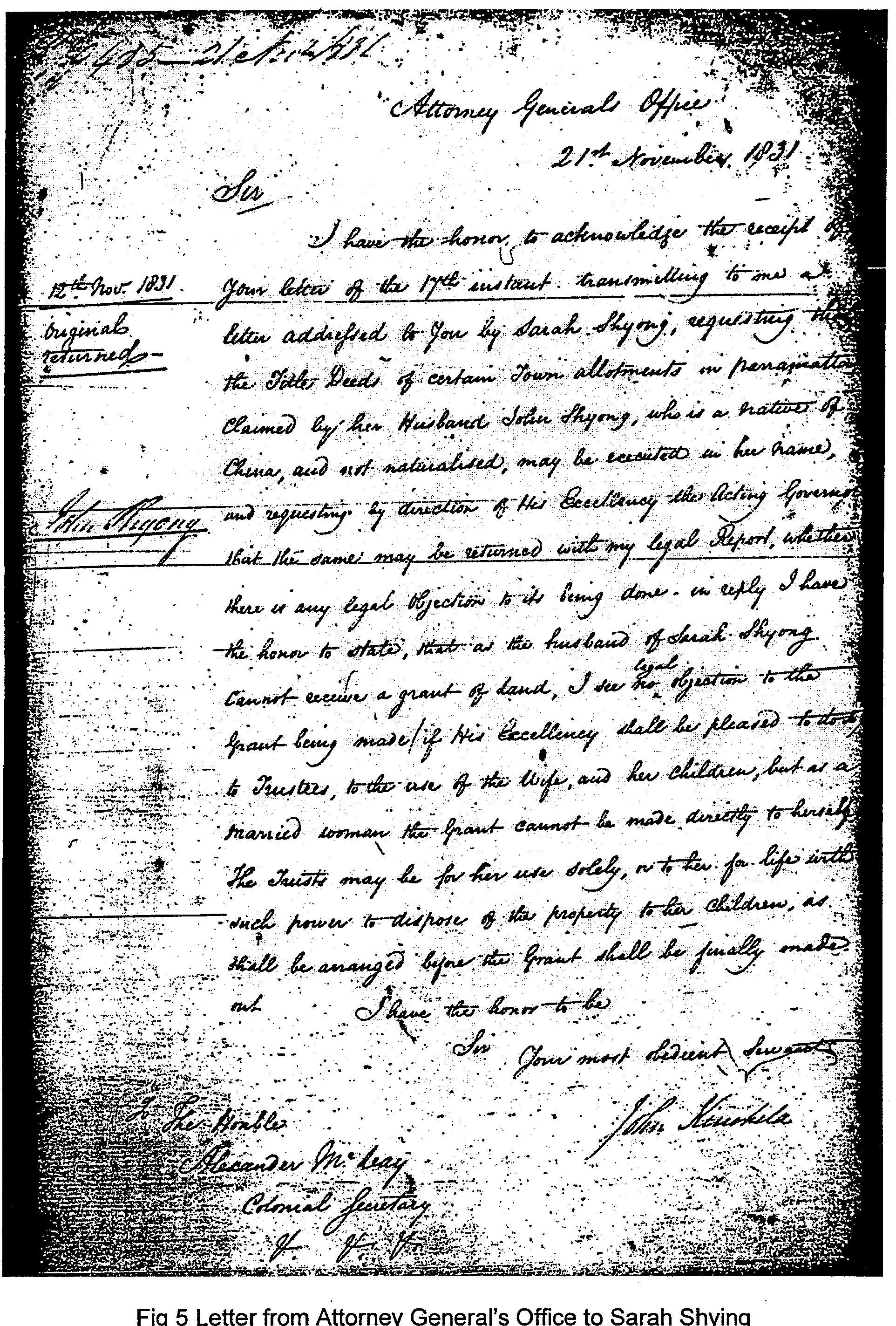
Letter from NSW Attorney General to Sarah Shying 1831

He married Bridget Gillorley on 10 October 1842, but she died some six months later.

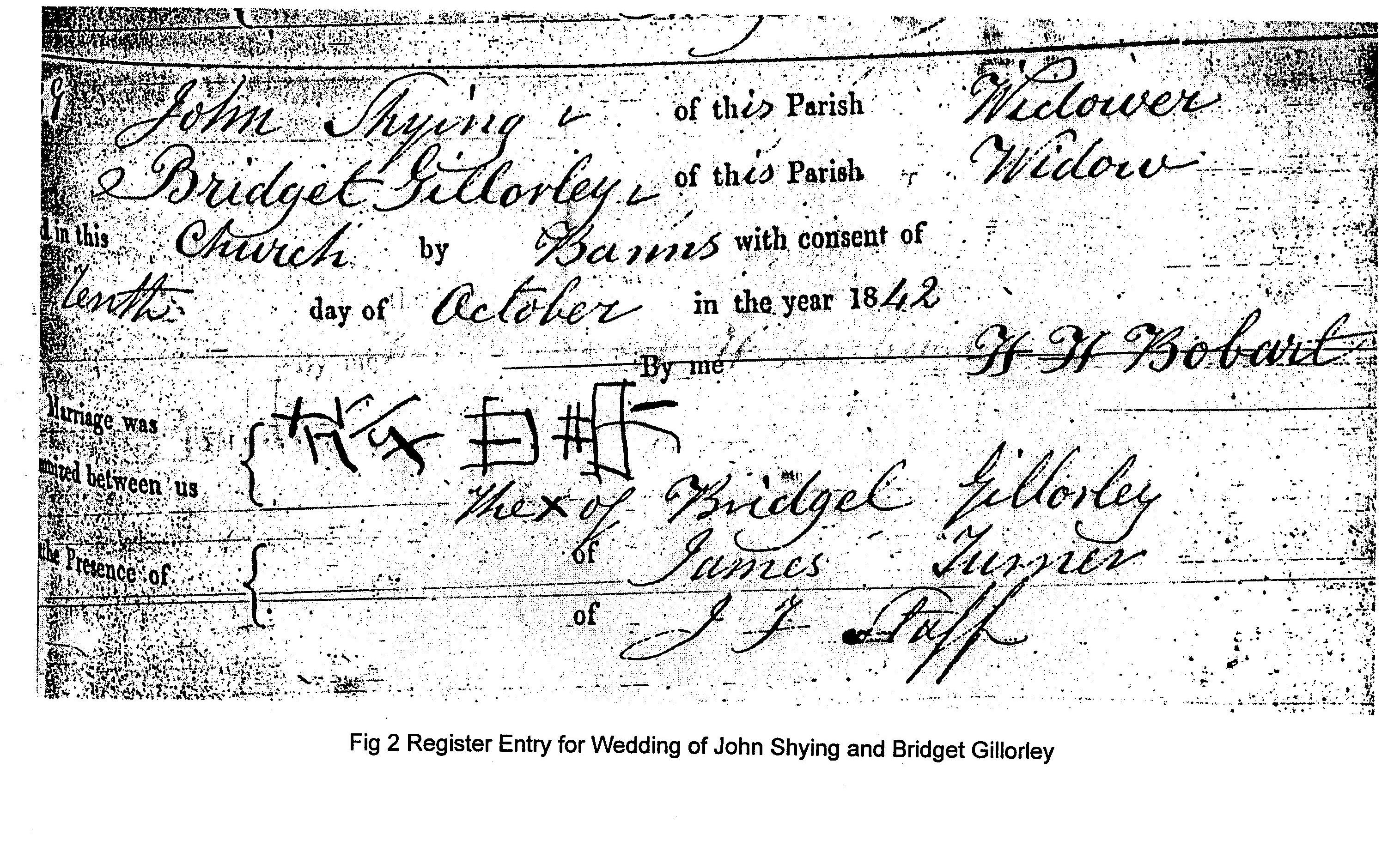
Marriage Register to Bridget Gillorley

He is known to have negotiated a sale of the Peacock Inn in Parramatta, New South Wales (a western suburb of Sydney) in 1844. He had been the builder.

His grandson, John Joseph Shying, was possibly the first Chinese-Australian to serve in the Australian army.

Although previously assumed that John died on 18 June 1880, Sydney, Australia, in the name John Sheen, the comparison of DNA of descendants of that man and those descended from John Shying indicate them to have been different individuals.

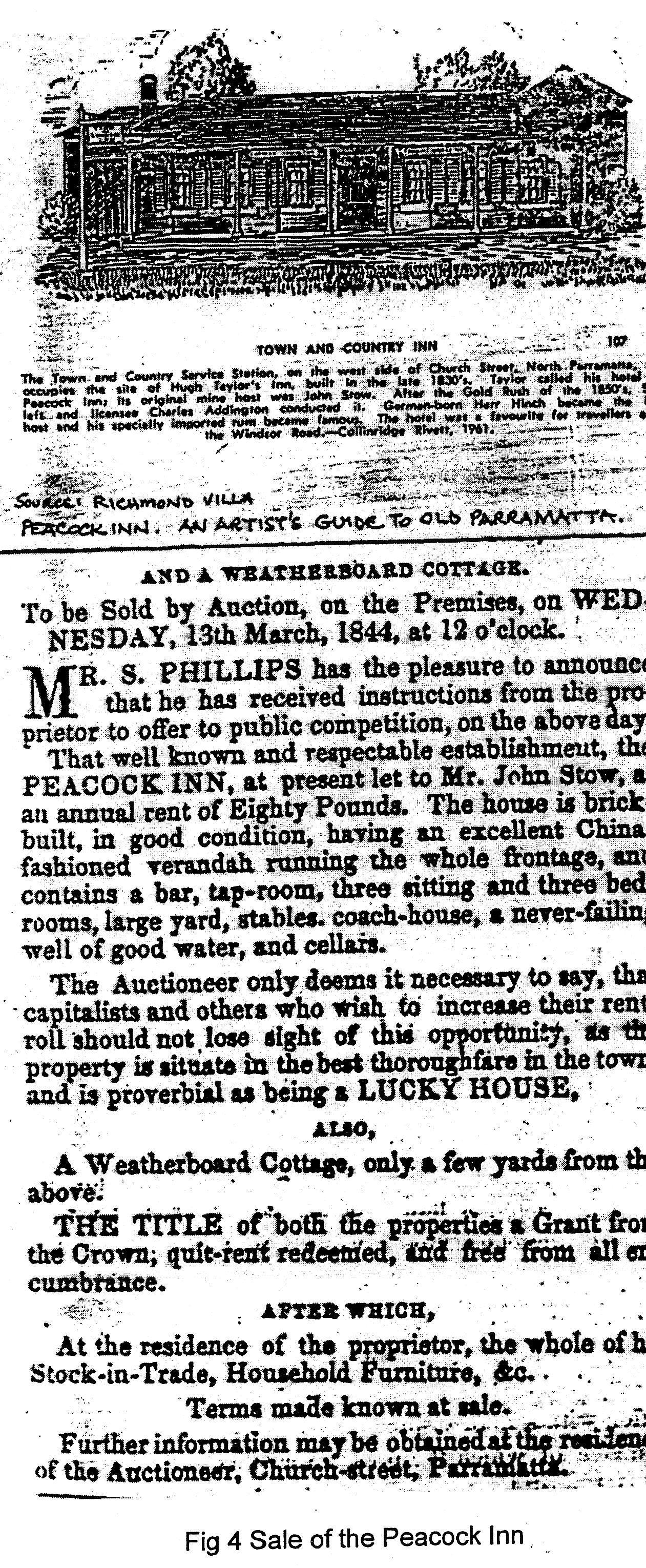
A place Mak built and worked as Publican, he also negotiated this sale
