= The Chinese Advertiser =

Australian newspaper (1855–1858)

- 14 June 1856 issue, via the National Library of Australia
- Type: Weekly
- Publisher: Robert Bell
- Founded: 1856
- Ceased publication: c. August 1858
- Language: Chinese, English
- City: Ballarat, Victoria, Australia
- Circulation: 400 (as of 1856)

Chinese name
- Traditional Chinese: 英唐招帖
Transcriptions
Standard Mandarin
- Hanyu Pinyin: Yīngtáng zhāotiē
Yue: Cantonese
- Jyutping: jing1 tong4 ziu1 tip3

The Chinese Advertiser, later the English and Chinese Advertiser (Chinese: 英唐招帖; pinyin: Yīngtáng zhāotiē) was a Chinese language newspaper published in the Australian city of Ballarat from c. May 1856 to c. August 1858. Published weekly by an English linguist named Robert Bell, it consisted mainly of advertisements and official notices.

== Publication history ==
Robert Bell was an English linguist who claimed to have studied the Chinese language for four years before settling in Australia. During the Victorian gold rush, which brought many Chinese laborers to the area around Ballarat, he passionately defended Chinese culture and welfare in local newspapers. This resulted in the moniker "Chinese Bell" from his detractors. In April 1855, he placed advertisements in The Ballarat Star that he was beginning a Chinese newspaper which would be published each Saturday, available for no cost. The first issue of this paper was released on 19 April or 3 May 1856, beginning the earliest known Chinese newspaper in Australia. It claimed a circulation of 400 in 1856.

The paper was initially named The Chinese Advertiser, before being renamed to The Chinese and English Advertiser in October 1856. The Chinese-language name of the paper also varied between its early issues: it was first named Tangren Xin Wenzhi, and then Fan Tangren Xin Wenzhi. From late 1857 until the end of its publication, the paper adopted the Chinese title Yingtang Zhaotie (英唐招帖), a translation of the English name.

Bell likely used lithography to print the paper for its first 25 issues. At least one copy, dated 30 August 1856, was printed with stonecut relief printing. On 11 October, Bell began using a letterpress to print the English portions, with cast metal pieces to print the Chinese. In a letter to the colony's governor in September 1857, Bell wrote that the newspaper "was first lithographed, then printed by Zincography, then and now by Xylography, but I am about to make moveable metal Types". At some point following this, he switched to using the traditional Chinese woodblocks. Poorly-carved woodblocks resulted in primitively-shaped Chinese characters after this switch. These dramatically rose in quality in the later issues of the paper, using both Song and regular script characters. Bell may have found Chinese craftsmen with experience in carving woodblocks.

The Chinese population of Ballarat began to decrease in 1858. The latest known issue of the paper, dated 7 August 1858, was essentially identical to another copy from two months prior, excepting the date and a single changed advertisement. A 1999 investigation concluded the paper likely ceased publication shortly after August 1858, while a 2013 study said that the paper ceased publication at the end of 1860. In 1868, a newspaper report described the English and Chinese Advertiser as "entirely [Bell's] own affair, for he cut the characters on blocks of wood, from which he took impressions...the thing was but a rude broadsheet after all, and died a natural death long since".

Only ten surviving issues of the paper are known. As of 2012, six of the copies were held in Ballarat, while the remainder were held by the State Library of Victoria and the Mitchell Library. These have been digitized by Trove, the newspaper database of the National Library of Australia. Three of the issues were displayed at the Chinese Voice exhibition at the Museum of Australian Democracy at Eureka in 2015.

== Content ==
The masthead of The Chinese Advertiser featured the text "Gratis" and "Read to make trade convenient". The earliest known issue included a mission statement calling the paper "the pioneer of Christianity and Christian civilisation among the Chinese in Australasia" alongside a biblical verse. It consisted of one sheet with four pages, printed on 518 by 358 mm paper originally, before switching to 567 by 444 mm.

The paper mainly consisted of local advertisements and official notices. Most advertisements were local, although some from other areas (such as the Tasmanian goldfields) were also included. Initially exclusively printed in Chinese, it became a bilingual Chinese-English paper on 11 October 1856. The amount of English content decreased over time, with monolingual Chinese advertisements becoming more prevalent.
