= Tung Wah Times =

Chinese-language Australian newspaper (1898–1936)

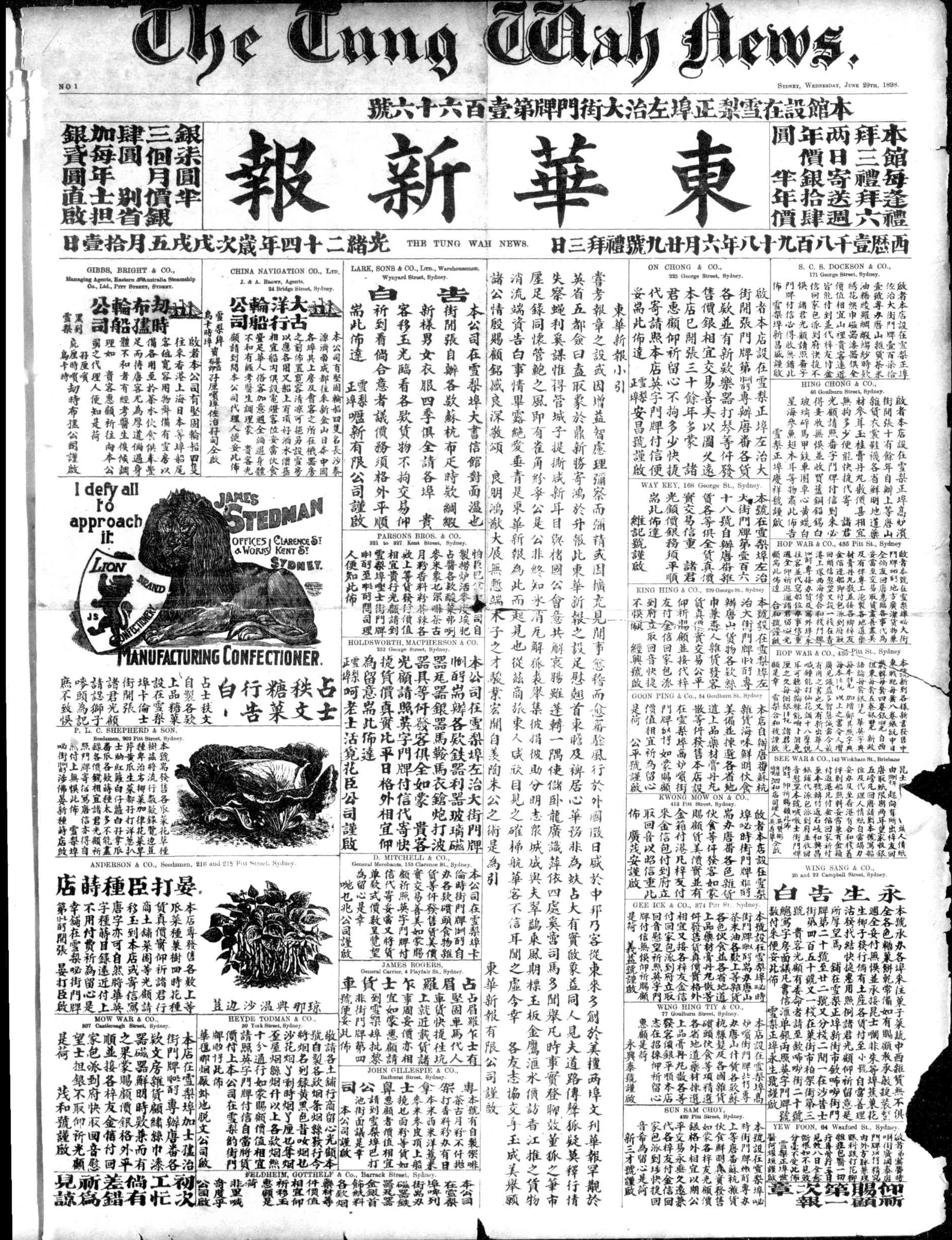
- First issue of the Tung Wah News, published 29 June 1898
- Founded: 1898
- Ceased publication: 1936
- Language: Chinese
- City: Sydney
- Country: Australia

The Tung Wah Times (Chinese: 東華報; pinyin: Dōnghuá bào), known as the Tung Wah News (Chinese: 東華新報; pinyin: Dōnghuá xīnbào) until 1902, was a Chinese-language Australian newspaper published between 1898 and 1936. Founded by Chinese merchants in Sydney, the newspaper was supportive of the Qing dynasty reform movement and was closely affiliated with the Chinese Empire Reform Association (CERA). The paper also criticised anti-Chinese policies in Australia, encouraging greater activism and political consciousness among the merchant class. It encouraged Chinese Australians to abandon practices that were perceived as contributing to anti-Chinese sentiment, such as gambling, opium smoking, and traditional worship practices, and to better assimilate into Australian society.

In 1902 the paper entered into bankruptcy after being found liable for defaming a Chinese-Australian businessman named W. R. G. Lee. It soon re-emerged as the Tung Wah Times. The Tung Wah Times continued to be closely affiliated with the CERA and the merchant class, but shifted towards a more moderate political stance, supporting constitutionalism amid the 1911 Revolution and promoting Chinese community solidarity both within Australia and overseas. The Tung Wah Times eventually ceased publication in 1936.

== Publication history ==
=== Foundation ===
The Tung Wah News was founded by Chinese merchants in Sydney in 1898. The paper was a joint-stock company founded with £1000 (equivalent to $181,000 in 2022) in initial capital, split into 5000 shares each worth four shillings. Wealthy merchants, many of them fruit traders, owned the largest shares of the paper, while many market gardeners were minor shareholders. The company was formed on 10 June and published its first issue on 29 June. The Tung Wah News was initially released twice weekly on Wednesdays and Sundays, and was printed by George Murray and Company. It was managed by an elected six-member committee that met monthly, and was supported financially by subscription revenue and advertising taken out by both Australian and Chinese companies. In its early years, the paper earned revenue of about £240 per year (equivalent to $43,400 in 2022).

The newspaper's first editor was Wu Yuping, while its other major contributor was the journalist Thomas Chang Luke. One of the newspaper's most influential figures—and its largest shareholder—was the businessman Thomas Yee Hing. Yee Hing had arrived in Australia in 1875 and was the manager of the trading firm On Chong & Company. He was an active and well-regarded figure in the Sydney Chinese community, and had a strong commitment to the development of a Chinese diasporic identity and community solidarity.

=== Tung Wah News (1898–1902) ===
In its early years the Tung Wah News's coverage frequently addressed social and political issues, including advocating against opium use and supporting women's rights. The contents of the paper were also tailored to the business interests of its shareholders; it contained business news, exchange rates, and advertisements for the remittance trade, as well as news on overseas Chinese diaspora communities. The paper had a strong focus on encouraging political consciousness and patriotism among the Chinese-Australian community, particularly within the merchant class. Many members of the wealthier Chinese merchant class blamed working-class Chinese-Australians for harming the community's reputation through gambling, opium smoking, and traditional worship practices. The Tung Wah Times encouraged its readers to refrain from these practices and to assimilate into Australian society by improving their English and adopting more Western modes of life. The paper also expressed support for Confucianism, presenting it as a progressive and modern belief system that would encourage assimilation into Australian society.

The paper's political coverage was supportive of the Qing dynasty reform movement and the Hundred Days' Reform, and it soon became part of a global diaspora network of community organisations and newspapers supportive of the Qing reformers. In 1900, a New South Wales branch of the Chinese Empire Reform Association (CERA) was founded by Yee Hing and other figures associated with the Tung Wah News; its first meeting was held on 14 January at the newspaper's offices, and it soon grew to several hundred members. The association received a boost when the reformer Liang Qichao visited Australia in 1900, causing the circulation of the Tung Wah News to reach its peak. However, the CERA soon went into decline, partly as a result of internal divisions. Chang Luke resigned from the Tung Wah News and moved to Melbourne, where he began to publish the Chinese Times and became a supporter of the revolutionaries.

In 1902 the Tung Wah News was sued by the businessman W. R. G. Lee for harm caused to his reputation by the paper's reporting. A business dispute had arisen between Lee's association—the Lin Yik Tong—and Yee Hing's reformist faction. The paper published pieces attacking Lee and accusing him of using his leadership of the Lin Yik Tong for personal profit. The court ruled in favour of Lee, ordering the Tung Wah News to pay £700 in damages and £1400 in costs. The paper declared bankruptcy on 21 June and published its last issue on 23 June as a result.

=== Tung Wah Times (1902–1936) ===
As the Tung Wah News prepared to offer its printing blocks at auction, a businessman named John Hoe claimed that the paper owed him £300 (equivalent to $49,000 in 2022), allowing him to take possession of the printing blocks. This allowed the paper to recommence publication on 16 August 1902 under the title the Tung Wah Times. The new paper was published once per week and was shorter in length. The paper's editors included Ng Ngok-low, who would remain on staff for almost two decades, and Tong Chai-chih.

The paper's revival coincided with a shift in its coverage towards a degree of support for the revolutionary cause. Tong was a particularly committed revolutionary, writing in the first issue of the new Tung Wah Times that the paper's goal was to cultivate anti-Manchu and revolutionary sentiments. Tong and the Tung Wah Times eventually moderated their stance, becoming supporters of moderate constitutionalism. However, the newspaper's coverage continued to include support for a broader range of political causes than it had previously, including the publication of some republican poetry. The paper reprinted the editorials of the Shanghai-based Eastern Times and the literary journal New Fiction, both published by Liang Qichao, allowing the political concerns of the reformist merchant class in Shanghai to be transmitted to Australia. The Tung Wah Times also acted as an agent from around 1904 onwards, providing content that was reprinted in diaspora newspapers affiliated with the CERA across Asia and North America. The newspaper expanded its distribution in Southeast Asia, deepening business ties between the Australian and Southeast Asian Chinese diaspora communities.

In 1904 the formation of the Anti-Chinese and Asiatic League began to cause damage to the business interests of Chinese fruit traders. The Tung Wah Times argued that there was an urgent need for the Chinese community to be protected against the anti-Chinese movement and the White Australia Policy. In 1905 the newspaper also began regularly publishing pieces supporting a global boycott of American goods to protest the Chinese Exclusion Act of 1882. Australian Chinese merchants were concerned that any further tightening of US immigration restrictions could encourage the Australian government to implement similar restrictions on Chinese entry to the country. The Tung Wah Times drew substantial support and fundraising for the anti-American boycott movement, while the influence of its political reporting also drove a resurgence of the CERA.

From 1906 the Sydney merchant class associated with the Tung Wah Times found itself increasingly at odds with the wider Chinese-Australian community. The paper increasingly became a vehicle for the wealthy merchant class, frequently publishing advertisements for expensive consumer goods and reporting on cultural and philanthropic topics of interest to the wealthier segment of the Chinese community. In the years that followed, the merchant class associated with the Tung Wah Times and the CERA also began to see a decline in their influence as an increasing number left Australia and returned to China due to racism and anti-immigration sentiment. The newspaper's influence was further undermined by a series of financial scandals associated with its connections to the CERA. Faced with debt and accusations of embezzlement, the manager of the Tung Wah Times committed suicide in 1909.

During the 1911 Revolution, the Tung Wah Times defended constitutionalism and criticised the revolutionary government in Guangdong. The paper also encouraged cooperation between the revolutionary and constitutionalist factions following the establishment of the Republic of China. In the years leading up to the Second World War, the Tung Wah Times criticised appeasement policies towards Japan and called on student movements to resist the Japanese occupation. The paper expressed its support for peace and condemned collaborators and Japanese propaganda.

=== Dissolution ===
The Tung Wah Times ceased publication in 1936. Scholars have attributed this to a continued decline in the Chinese population, which eventually fell to a low of around 10,000 following the Second World War, as well as the increased accessibility of overseas Chinese-language newspapers due to the introduction of air freight. Younger Chinese Australians were also more likely to be fluent in English, with many unable to read Chinese, and had less interest in Chinese-language publications.

== Literary works ==
The Tung Wah News and Tung Wah Times published a large number of literary works. The Tung Wah News initially published a range of short stories, poetry, and essays, while the Tung Wah Times expanded its literary coverage to include biographies and travel writing. The paper's early works were published in literary Chinese, as opposed to the vernacular Chinese employed by the Chinese Australian Herald and Chinese Times. In 1905 the paper also began to publish folk literature, and in 1906 it expanded the length of each issue due to the demand for literary works. However, the number of literary works published in the Tung Wah Times began to decline in the mid-1920s, and fell to close to zero by the 1930s.

Many of the works published in the newspaper reflected its social and political aims. It published stories, songs, and poems that condemned the use of opium, with many using metaphors to imply that the use of opium harms not only the user, but also the entire community. It also published a number of works featuring female characters and criticising patriarchal attitudes and practices like foot binding and polygamy. One story published in 1910 featured a woman detective named Ms. Lotus Flower. The poems and stories published in the newspaper often depicted elements of the Chinese-Australian experience, including themes of migration, anti-Chinese prejudice, and homesickness.
