= Sydney University Press =

Academic publisher

- Parent company: University of Sydney
- Status: Active
- Founded: 1962
- Country of origin: Australia
- Headquarters location: Sydney, New South Wales
- Distribution: Worldwide
- Publication types: Academic publishing
- Official website: sydney.edu.au/sup

Sydney University Press is the scholarly publisher of the University of Sydney. It is part of the Library.

Sydney University Press was founded as a traditional university press and operated as such from 1962 to 1987. It was re-established in 2003 under the management of the University of Sydney Library to meet the new challenges of scholarly communication in the networked environment.

== History ==
As early as 1939, a Sydney University Press was being advocated by Dr. R. S. Wallace, then vice chancellor of the university. Some years later in May 1947, Laurie Fitzhardinge, a professor at Sydney University, went to London to investigate the possibility of starting up the Sydney University Press.

The original Sydney University Press was established by the university in 1962.

University by-law at the time enshrined its objectives: "...the objects of Sydney University Press shall be to undertake the publication of works of learning and to carry out the business of publication in all its branches".

The Press was effectively dismantled in 1987 to become, for a time, an imprint of Oxford University Press until the mid-1990s when Oxford University Press relinquished the imprint and business name.

During this relatively brief period of time Sydney University Press published several hundred books and many journals representing scholarship at the university and beyond. These publications included major works by many of the university's leading scholars such as JM Ward, Butlin, Turney, Wilkes, K Campbell, J Young, Wolnizer, Jeans, Meaney, and Webby. It included series such as the Challis Shakespeare, Australian Literary Reprints, and journals such as Journal of Industrial Relations, Mankind, Australian Economic History Review, Abacus, and Pathology. The output of Sydney University Press represented the breadth, and the best, of the University of Sydney.

== Current activities ==
Sydney University Press publishes 20-25 new titles each year. SUP's publishing scope includes series in archaeology, animal studies, public policy, Indigenous music, China studies, Australian literature and Celtic studies. The press also publishes in Australian history, biography, urban planning and public health.

SUP also publishes a few titles related to activities on campus. These include the annual student anthology edited by a group of volunteers from the Master of Publishing degree (Threads 2007, Cellar Door 2008, Margins 2009, Sandstone 2010) and the creative writing journals from the University of Sydney Union, ARNA and Phoenix. SUP has also published a number of official and unofficial histories from the university, including 150 Years of the Faculty of Medicine, 150 Years 150 Firsts: People of the Faculty of Medicine, Sydney University Sport 1852-2007: more than a club, 50 Great Moments: Celebrating the Golden Jubilee of the University of Sydney's Electron Microscope Unit; and Educating for business, public service and the social sciences: A history of the Faculty of Economics at the University of Sydney 1920–1999.

== Australian literature ==
SUP has used a number of CAL Cultural Fund grants to improve access to out-of-print Australian literature. In 2003, 25 Australian novels were brought back into print under the Classic Australian Works series. In 2009, a new series, the Australian Classics Library was commenced. Twelve titles, chosen by Professor Robert Dixon and Emeritus Professor Bruce Bennett, had new introductions written to reposition them for the scholarly and education markets. In 2009, Resourceful Reading: The New Empiricism, eResearch and Australian Literary Culture was released, containing a series of essays on emerging research into literary theory and the use of digital technology in the humanities.
