= Lowe Kong Meng =

Chinese-Australian businessman (died 1888)

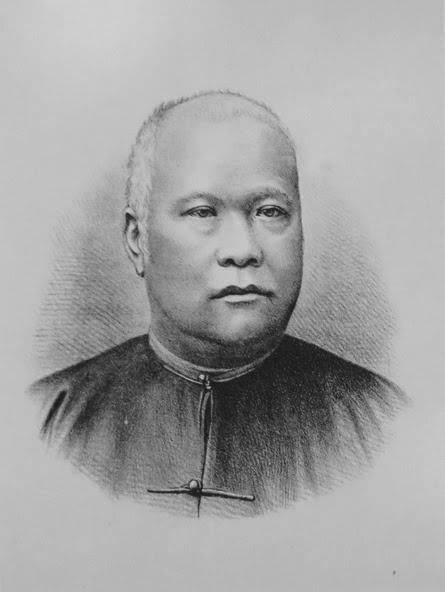
- Portrait of Kong Meng c. 1887
- Born: 1830 or 1831; Penang
- Died: 22 October 1888 (aged 57 or 58); Melbourne, Australia
- Occupation: Merchant

Lowe Kong Meng
- Traditional Chinese: 劉光明
- Simplified Chinese: 刘光明
- Hanyu Pinyin: Liú Guāngmíng
Transcriptions
Standard Mandarin
- Hanyu Pinyin: Liú Guāngmíng
Yue: Cantonese
- Jyutping: lau4 gwong1 ming4
Southern Min
- Hokkien POJ: Lâu Kong-bêng

Lowe Kong Meng (Note: Kong Meng's family name in Chinese is Lowe (simplified Chinese: 刘; traditional Chinese: 劉; pinyin: Liú; Jyutping: lau4; Pe̍h-ōe-jī: Lâu), but in Australia he took Kong Meng as his family name. Contemporary sources refer to him using "Kong Meng" as his surname.) (born 1830 or 1831; died 22 October 1888) was a Chinese-Australian businessman. Born into a trading family in Penang, Kong Meng learned English and French at an early age and worked as an importing merchant around the Indian Ocean. In 1853 he moved to Melbourne where he started a business importing goods for Chinese miners during the Victorian gold rush. After 1860, as the Chinese population in Melbourne peaked, he diversified into other lines of business, including investing in the Commercial Bank of Australia. Kong Meng was a prominent and well-regarded member of Melbourne's elite, and for a time was one of the city's wealthiest men. He was a leading defender of Chinese Australians at a time when their status was politically controversial and they were subjected to targeted taxation, discrimination and violence.

== Early life ==
Kong Meng was born in Penang in either 1830 or 1831. His father Lowe A Quee was a merchant who owned significant amounts of property in Penang. His family had originated in Siyi in Guangdong, and had been trading in Penang for "a century". He went to high school in Penang and at the age of 16 travelled to Mauritius where he learned English and French under private tuition. Between 1847 and 1853 he began operating as an importing merchant, particularly between Singapore, Mauritius, and Calcutta (now Kolkata in India). He travelled between these destinations as a supercargo.

Kong Meng was a British subject by virtue of being born in Penang. He and his family supported the British in the First Opium War, in which his brother was killed "in the service of the East India Company".

== Merchant in Victoria ==
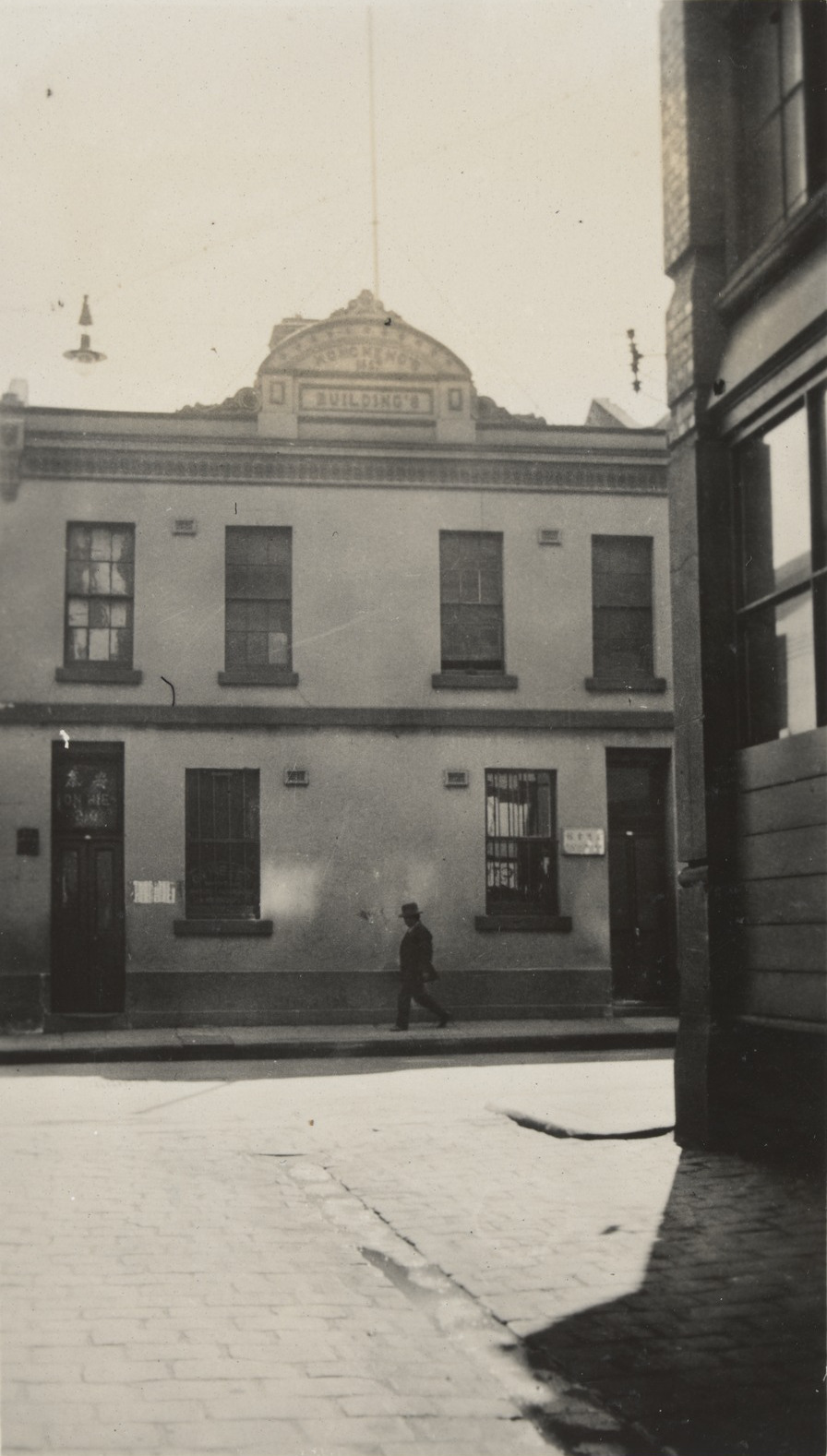
The Kong Meng building on Little Bourke Street in Melbourne's Chinatown 1934

In 1853, Kong Meng travelled to Melbourne after hearing of the Victorian gold rush in Mauritius. He was the first Chinese merchant to arrive in Victoria. After unsuccessfully attempting mining for 3 months, Kong Meng left Australia for Calcutta disillusioned. He returned with cargo from India and established an importing firm Kong Meng and Co. in 1854.

Initially, Kong Meng's importing business catered primarily to the needs of Chinese miners on the Victorian goldfields. This included opium, preserved foods, tea and clothing. Most of the rice being shipped to Melbourne came from Calcutta, and it is possible that Kong Meng was part of this trade given his connections there. British traders were supplying most of the tea drunk by British in Victoria, and it is likely he was not a large importer of tea. By the mid-1860s, he was the biggest single supplier of goods for Chinese miners in Victoria. To pay for his imports, Kong Meng's business was also a major exporter of gold from Australia, primarily to Galle in Sri Lanka and Hong Kong.

Kong Meng's importing business was also involved in Chinese migration to Victoria. Between 1857 and 1867, 1,985 Chinese passengers arrived in Melbourne on ships for which he was the importing agent. From 1855, a landing tax of £10 (equivalent to A$1624 in 2018) was levied on Chinese migrants who disembarked at Victorian ports. To avoid this, it was common for Chinese migrants to disembark at Robe in the neighbouring colony of South Australia and walk the 350 kilometres (220 mi) to the goldfields in Victoria. At least one of Kong Meng's ships offloaded Chinese passengers at Robe. It is possible that he was the labour importer for others. He is credited with operating one of the largest credit-ticket operations in the antipodes.

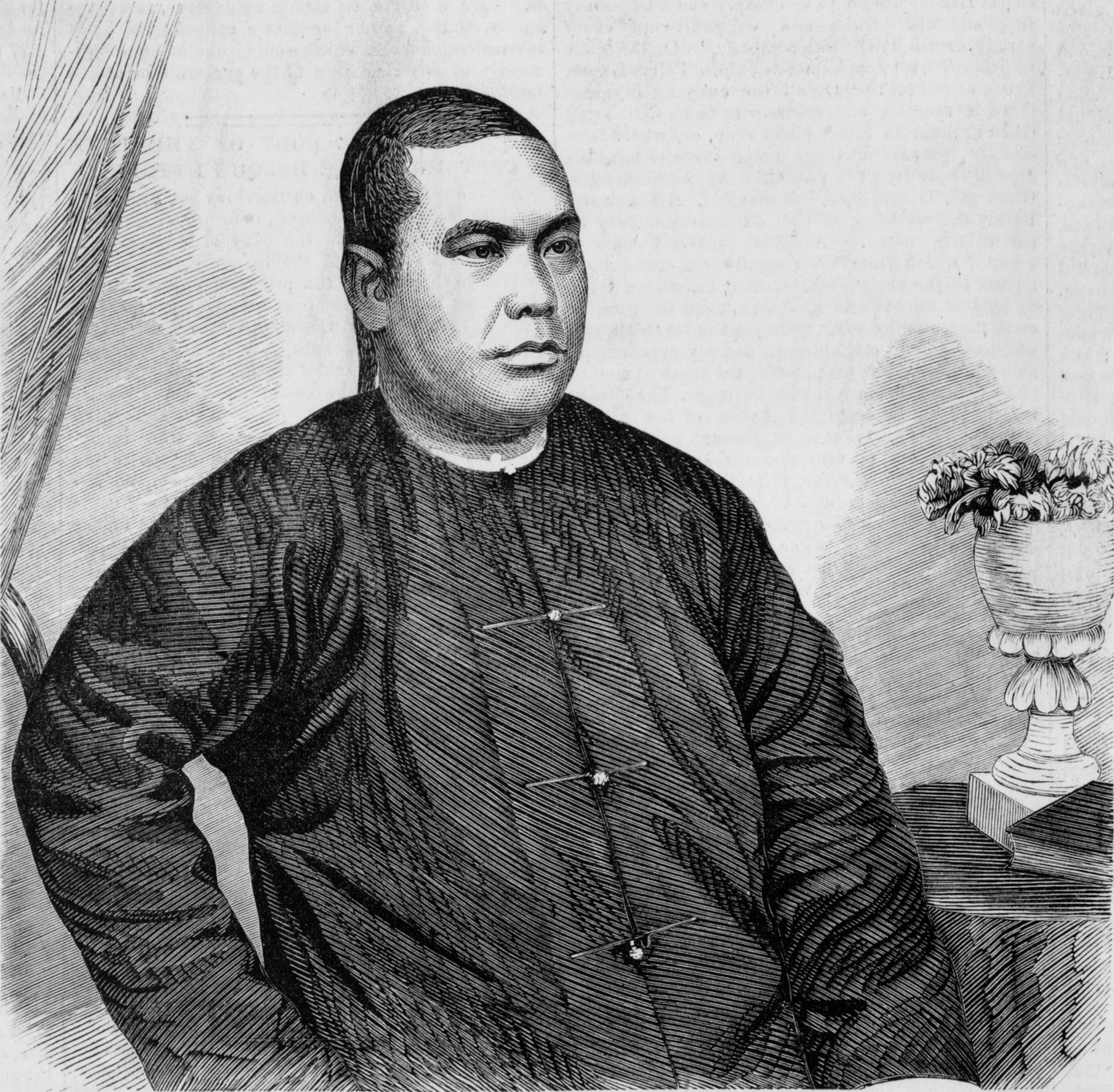
Lowe Kong Meng c. 1866

The number of Chinese miners in Victoria began to decline after 1859, and Kong Meng diversified his business accordingly. He began to import Chinese tea for European consumers, and invested in mining and banking. With Louis Ah Mouy, he was a founding shareholder in the Commercial Bank of Australia, which would eventually become Westpac. Their involvement in the bank was apparently part of an effort to attract Chinese depositors. A gold-mining firm based south of Maryborough, Kong Meng Gold Mining Company, was quite successful. By 1863, The Argus wrote that "there are reputedly few wealthier men in Victoria".

== Political contributions ==
From the start of the Victorian gold rush until the implementation of the White Australia policy, the status and treatment of Chinese Australians was politically controversial in colonial Australia. They were the subject of targeted taxation, discrimination and violence (e.g. the Buckland riot). As a leader in the Melbourne Chinese community, Kong Meng was a prominent voice defending Chinese migration, often contributing to debate about the so-called "Chinese question". In 1857, he testified before a Victorian parliamentary committee, arguing that clear laws would give Chinese migrants more confidence to settle in Australia with their families.

=== Victorian Chinese residence tax ===
In 1857, the Victorian government legislated a tax of £1 (equivalent to A$186 in 2018) per month on all Chinese residents in Victoria. This prompted petitions, protests and resistance from Chinese mining communities. By November 1857, the residency tax was amended to £6 per year, and it was again reduced to £4 per year in 1859 amid widespread civil disobedience and refusal to pay.

In May 1859, Kong Meng met with the Victorian governor. He argued that, since the tax had been conceived mainly to target Chinese miners, he and other Chinese merchants ought not to be subject to it. He distanced himself from the civil disobedience and campaigning of Chinese miners opposed to the tax. He and 150 other Chinese merchants duly paid the tax after their entreaties were unsuccessful. The unwillingness of Melbourne's Chinese merchants (including Kong Meng) to stand alongside Chinese miners contributed to the campaign against the tax eventually petering out.

=== The Chinese Question in Australia ===
In 1879, with Louis Ah Mouy and Cheok Hong Cheong, Kong Meng published a pamphlet The Chinese Question in Australia. It argued against excluding Chinese people from Australia, in the context of increasing support for exclusion in Australia and the passage of the Chinese Exclusion Act in the United States. The pamphlet referred to US congressional investigations, and testimony from missionaries in defence of Chinese migrants. It emphasised the importance of free Chinese migration to continuing free trade with China. The authors also pointed to obligations in the Anglo-Chinese Peking Convention of 1860 which granted reciprocal rights for Chinese people to travel and work in the British Empire. They rejected claims that Chinese migrants constituted cheap labour that would undercut British in Australia. Instead, they claimed that (like Irish migrants), their wages would quickly equalise with local workers.

=== Petition to the Chinese imperial commissioners ===
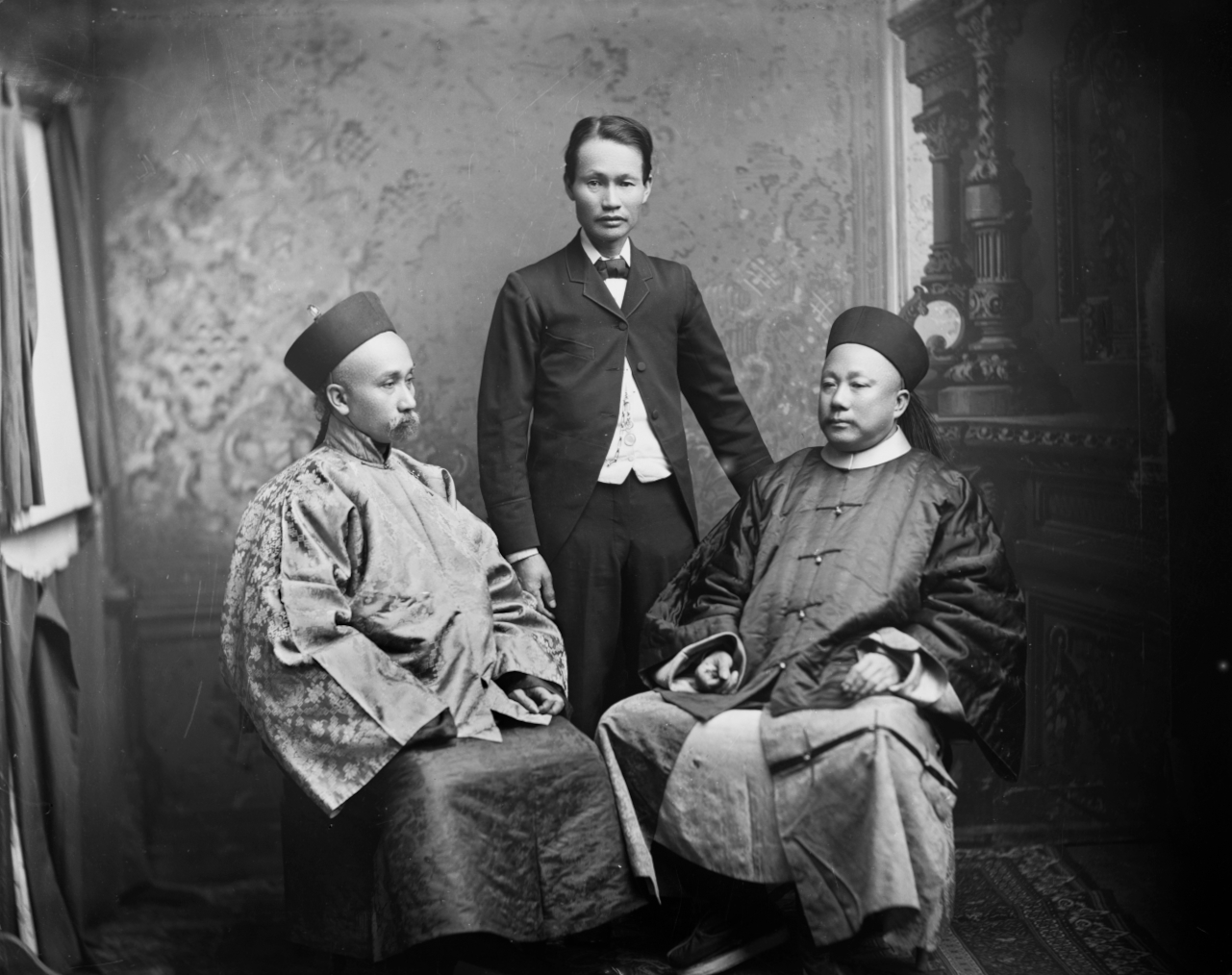
Imperial commissioners Wang Ronghe and Yu Quiong with an unidentified man (centre)

In 1887, the Zongli Yamen (the Qing ministry of foreign affairs), sent two imperial commissioners to Australia to investigate the treatment of Chinese Australians. The commissioners Wang Ronghe and Yu Quiong visited Melbourne, Sydney, Brisbane, Darwin and Cooktown. Kong Meng received them when they arrived at Spencer St station. He knew Wang personally as they had been classmates in the same English school in Penang. Kong Meng presented a petition to the commissioners co-signed with Louis Ah Mouy and Cheok Hong Cheong. The petition complained about the poll tax on Chinese residents, restrictions on their movement between Australian colonies, and unprovoked assaults on Chinese merchants. The petition was also presented to the Victorian premier, Duncan Gillies.

== Personal life ==
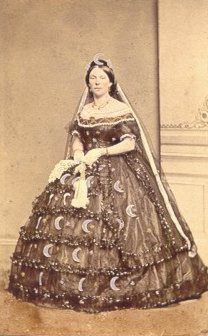
Annie Kong Meng c. 1866

Lowe Kong Meng's family name in Chinese is Lowe (Chinese: 劉; pinyin: Liú), but in Australia he took Kong Meng as his surname. In Australia, he retained his Chinese cultural heritage. He married Mary Ann (or Annie) Prussia in Melbourne on 4 February 1860. They had 12 children and lived in the wealthy suburb of Malvern. His mixed-race marriage appears not to have impeded his participation in the Melbourne elite. In 1867, the couple attended a fancy-dress ball in honour of the Duke of Edinburgh, Kong Meng wearing a mandarin's robes, while she dressed as a Grecian lady.

Kong Meng was a comfortable member of Melbourne's elite. Contemporary accounts described him with words like "cultured", "influential" and "highly esteemed" and reference extensive donations to charities and churches. Even The Bulletin, which supported exclusion of Chinese migrants from Australia, noted that he was "idolised by his Victorian fellow-countrymen". Elsewhere, The Bulletin relates a story of Kong Meng being accosted on a bus to Richmond by a "cheeky youth" who assumed he could not speak English. Kong Meng purportedly responded that he could happy converse in 6 languages, but requested that he not be addressed "in a dialect which should only be used by you for conversing with your own social equals.”

In 1863, Kong Meng was awarded the title Mandarin of the Blue Button by the Tongzhi Emperor in recognition of his leadership of the Chinese community in Melbourne. Redmond Barry invited him to curate Chinese art for an exhibition in 1869 but Kong Meng declined owing to the poor quality of art available in Victoria. He was a member of the Royal Society of Victoria and was appointed a commissioner for the Melbourne International Exhibition in 1880.

== Death and legacy ==
Lowe Kong Meng died on 22 October 1888 at his home in Malvern. The Argus reported that his funeral procession was made up of about 100 vehicles, and the route was lined by many people, including many Chinese Melburnians. He was buried in the Melbourne General Cemetery.

Kong Meng's family continued to be well regarded into the 20th century. In 1916, his son George wrote to The Age and The Argus, complaining that he had been rebuffed while attempting to enlist to fight in the First World War. He was rejected on grounds of being "not substantially of European origin". An editorial in the Euroa Gazette described the decision as unjust, calling the Kong Meng family "old and highly respected" in both Victoria's north-east and in Melbourne. The Argus also questioned the decision, pointing out that George's brother was already serving with the Australian 1st Division as a sergeant. Twenty-eight years after Lowe Kong Meng's death, The Argus recalled him as a "a gentleman of great public spirit, scrupulously honourable in all his dealings, and very highly esteemed by the citizens".
