= Chinatown, Melbourne =

Neighborhood in Melbourne, Australia

Melbourne Chinatown
- Chinese: 墨爾本唐人街
- Hakka: Med ngiˊ bunˋ tongˇ nginˇ gieˊ
Transcriptions
Standard Mandarin
- Hanyu Pinyin: Mò ěr běn Tángrénjiē
Hakka
- Romanization: Med ngiˊ bunˋ tongˇ nginˇ gieˊ
Yue: Cantonese
- Yale Romanization: mahk yíh bún Tòhngyàhn'gāai
- Jyutping: mak6 ji5 bun2 Tong4jan4gaai1

Alternative Chinese name
- Traditional Chinese: 墨爾本華埠
- Simplified Chinese: 墨尔本华埠
- Hakka: Med ngiˊ bunˋ faˇ pu
Transcriptions
Standard Mandarin
- Hanyu Pinyin: Mò ěr běn Huábù
Hakka
- Romanization: Med ngiˊ bunˋ faˇ pu
Yue: Cantonese
- Yale Romanization: mahk yíh bún Wàhbouh
- Jyutping: mak6 ji5 bun2 Waa4bou6

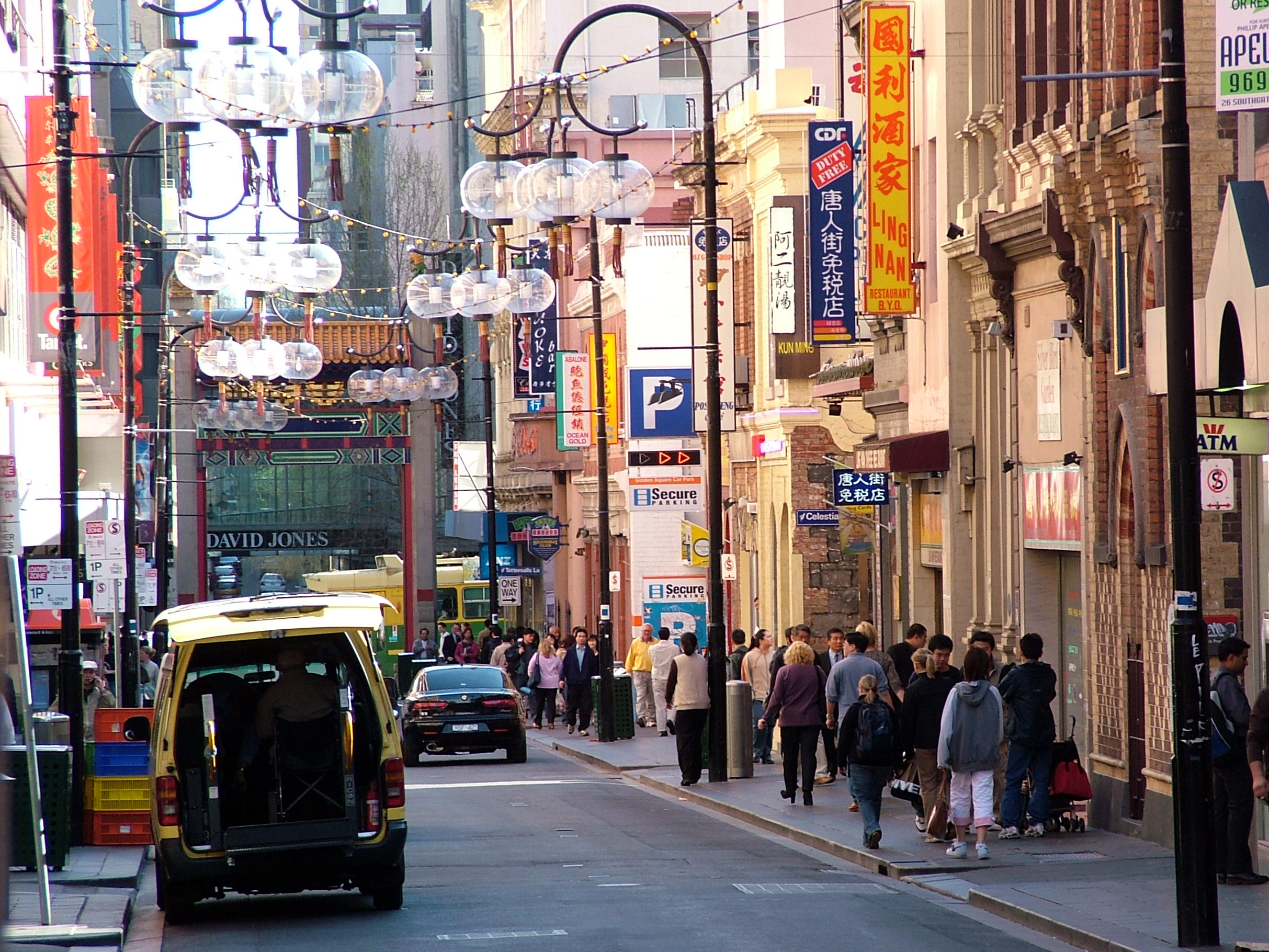
Looking west down Little Bourke Street, the centre of Chinatown

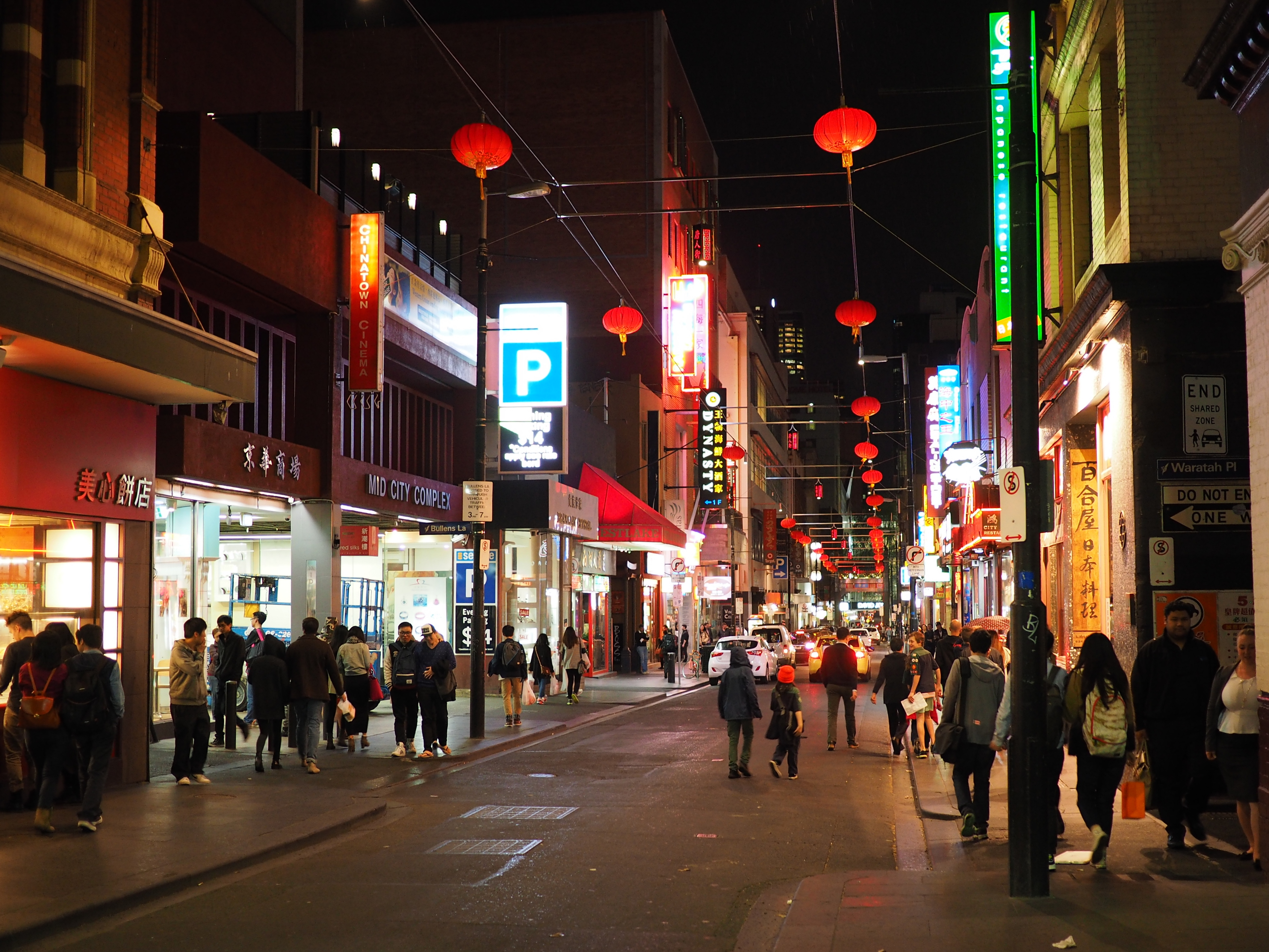
Chinatown at night

Chinatown (Chinese: 墨爾本華埠) is an ethnic enclave in the central business district (CBD) of Melbourne, Victoria, Australia. Centred at the eastern end of Little Bourke Street, it extends between the corners of Swanston and Spring streets, and consists of numerous laneways, alleys and arcades. Established in the 1850s during the Victorian gold rush, it is notable for being the longest continuous ethnic Chinese settlement in the Western World and the oldest Chinatown in the Southern Hemisphere.

Melbourne's Chinatown has played an important role in establishing the culture of Chinese immigrants in Australia, and is still home to many Chinese restaurants, cultural venues, businesses and places of worship. Today, Melbourne's Chinatown is a major tourist attraction, known for its architectural heritage, annual festivals and cuisines of Asian origins, as well as its karaoke venues, bars and fashion boutiques.

Chinatown is home to the Chinese Museum.

== History ==
=== Gold rush beginnings and colonial era (1850s–1890s) ===
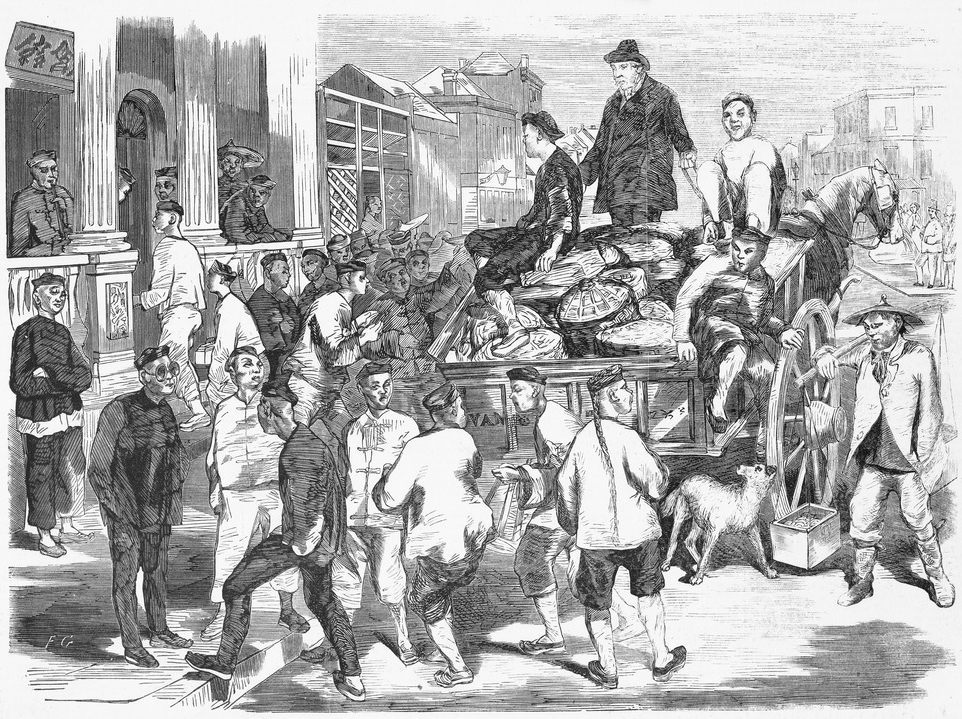
Chinese immigrants arriving in Chinatown, 1866

The advent of the Victorian gold rush in 1851 attracted immigrants from around the world, including tens of thousands of Chinese prospectors. The majority were Cantonese-speaking male villagers from Hong Kong and nearby areas, including the southwestern districts of Guangdong (See Yup), and its capital city Guangzhou (Sam Yap). The eastern half of Little Bourke Street was considered convenient for these immigrants, as both a staging post and a place to pick up supplies en route to the goldfields in central Victoria. The earliest lodging houses were established in Celestial Avenue, off Little Bourke Street, and by 1855, Chinese houses and businesses lined the majority of Little Bourke Street from Elizabeth to Russell streets.

It is notable for being the oldest Chinatown in the Southern Hemisphere, and the longest continuous Chinese settlement outside Asia, owing to San Francisco's Chinatown's relocation following the 1906 earthquake. The Victorian gold rush eventually waned, causing a shift from rural living and an influx of people migrating into metropolitan Melbourne, particularly Little Bourke Street, which already had a predominantly Chinese population.

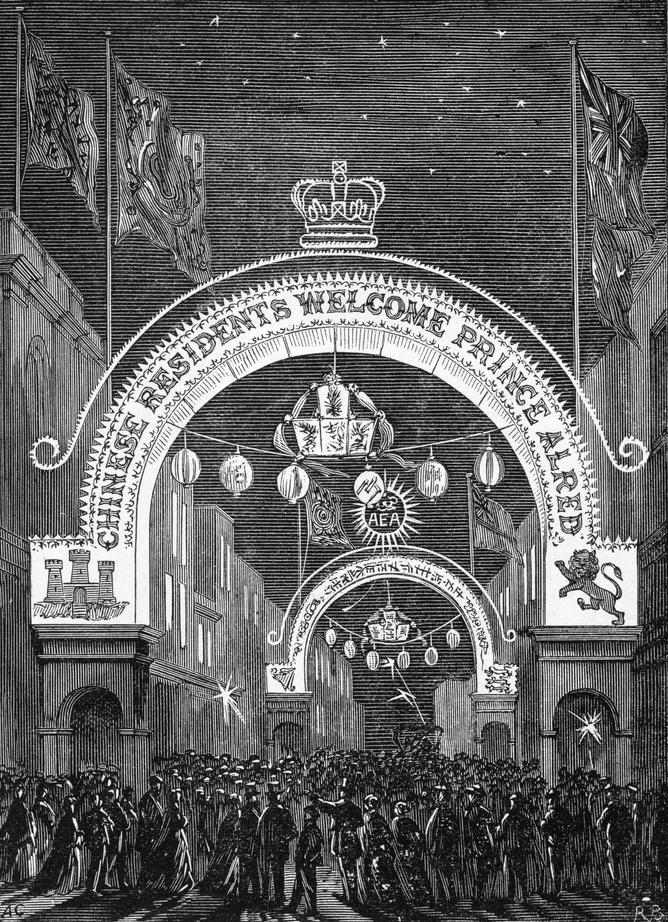
Chinatown illuminated at night with decorations welcoming the arrival of Prince Alfred, 1867

The residents of Chinatown established themselves as storekeepers, importers, furniture-makers, herbalists and in the wholesale fruit and vegetable industries, with a strong presence at the nearby Eastern Market on Bourke Street. Christian churches were built and Chinese political groups and newspapers were subsequently formed. Other members of the Chinese community who lived and worked elsewhere used Chinatown to congregate with friends. The area also provided further support to new Chinese immigrants.

Early in its history, Chinatown developed a reputation for "salubrious" enterprises including opium dens, gambling houses and brothels, but maintained a distinctly "entrepreneurial air". By 1859, Victoria's Chinese population reached approximately 45,000, representing nearly 8.5% of the colony's total population.

Australian colonial author Marcus Clarke wrote in 1868:

One-half of Little Bourke-street is not Melbourne but China. It is as though some djinn or genie had taken up a handful of houses from the middle of one of the Celestial cities, and flung them down, inhabitants and all, in the Antipodes. One almost expects to behold the princess on her way to the bath, or to meet that mighty potentate the brother to the sun, uncle to the moon, and first cousin to the seven stars.

Despite the cultural divide, several community leaders with strong Chinatown connections became influential and well-regarded among Melburnians more broadly, including businessman Lowe Kong Meng, police detective Fook Shing and missionary Cheok Hong Cheong. Also during the colonial period, a number of businesses run by Australians of European descent were based in Chinatown, including the offices of Table Talk, one of Melbourne's most popular magazines in the 1880s.

=== Federation, population decline and revival (1901–present day) ===
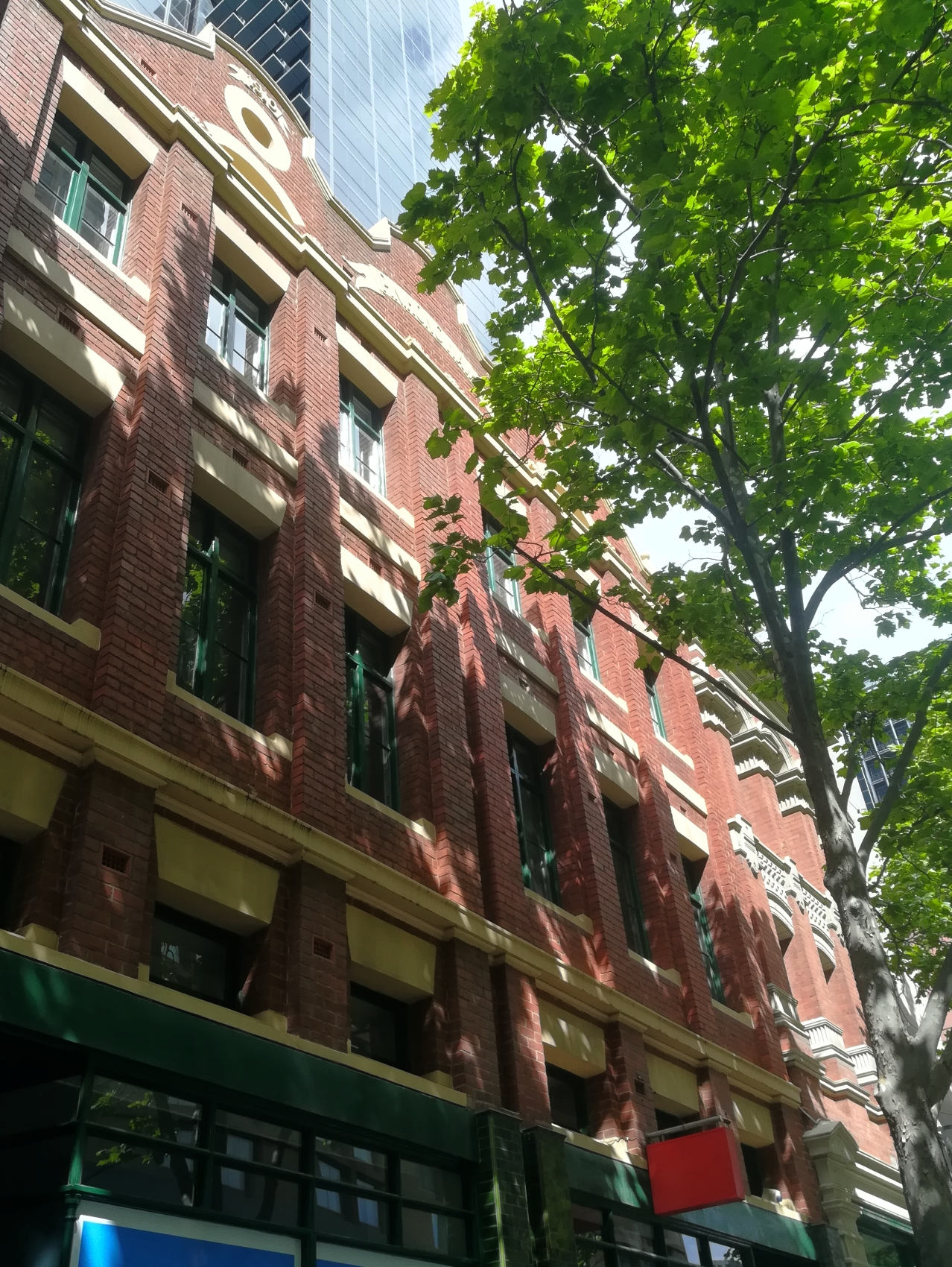
P. N. Hong Nam Building, Exhibition Street, built as a factory in 1910. By this stage, Chinatown had extended into Exhibition and Lonsdale streets, and overlapped with the Little Lon district.

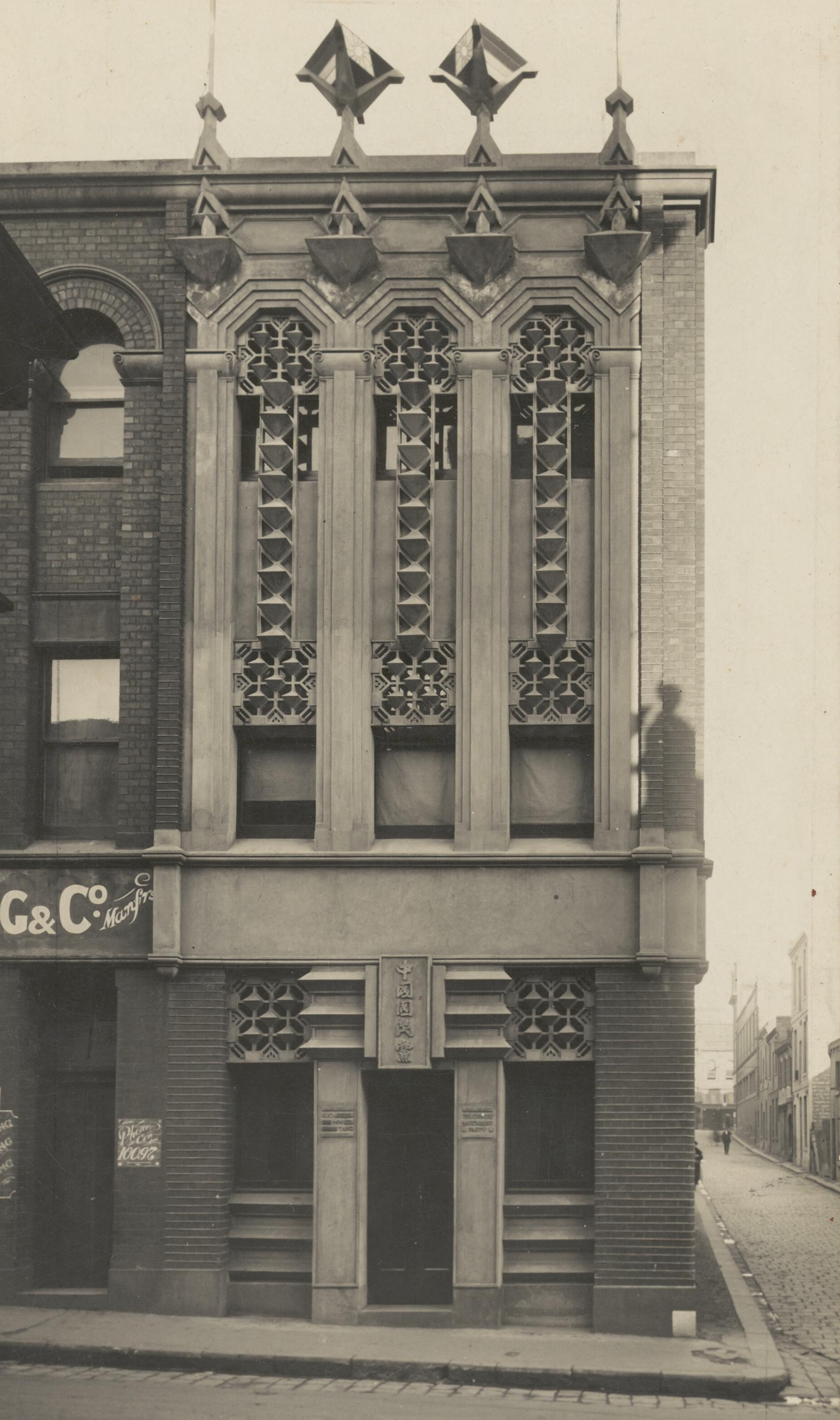
The facade of the Kuomintang (Chinese Nationalist Party) Melbourne headquarters, remodeled by Walter Burley Griffin in 1921

Chinatown peaked in the early 20th century in terms of population and size with businesses having expanded into the nearby Little Lon red-light district, transforming it into a predominantly Chinese-owned area. This growth was hampered by the Immigration Restriction Act, implemented after the federation of Australia in 1901. Chinatown's subsequent decline was further exacerbated by a broader shift of businesses and residents from Melbourne's central business district (CBD) to the surrounding suburbs.

In the 1920s, more Australians of European descent began frequenting Chinatown eateries, one being Chung Wah on Heffernan Lane, a haven for members of the University of Melbourne ALP Club. This growing patronage helped pave the way for a distinctly Australian Chinese cuisine, which achieved mainstream popularity by the mid-20th century. The dim sim, a staple of Australian Chinese cuisine, was invented in Chinatown by William Wing Young, in 1945, at his restaurant Wing Lee, and has become a major snack food in takeaway outlets and supermarkets throughout the country. Young's daughter, Elizabeth Chong, became a television celebrity chef and Chinatown tour guide. Chinatown's potential as a tourist site was recognised in the 1960s by local entrepreneur and politician David Wang, whose push for the redevelopment of Little Bourke Street led to the archways of today.

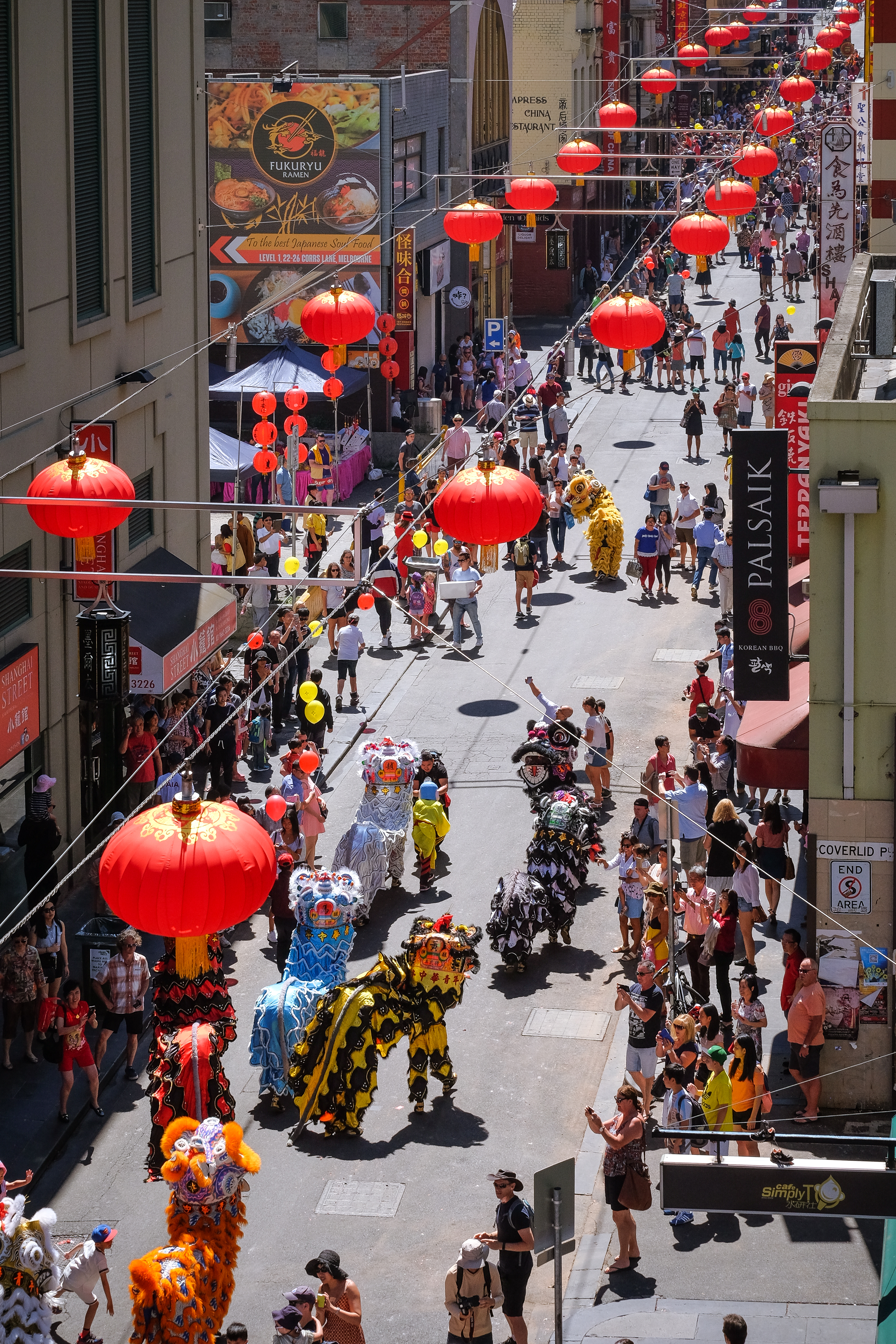
Chinese New Year celebrations in Chinatown

During the 1960s and 1970s, the White Australia policy was dismantled, resulting in a substantial increase in immigration from Indochina, Singapore, Malaysia, Taiwan, Hong Kong and the People's Republic of China. The demographics of Chinatown, as well as its culinary scene, greatly diversified as a result.

In 2010, the ground floor of the Chinese Museum was remodelled as a visitor centre for Melbourne's Chinatown. The following year, a memorial statue of Dr Sun Yat-sen was unveiled outside the museum's entrance, in celebration of the 100th anniversary of the founding of the Republic of China. The traditional Chinese New Year Lion Dance has always ended at this spot, but will now end with a blessing of the statue.

== Culture ==
=== Chinese New Year ===
The Chinese New Year is primarily celebrated in Chinatown on the first Sunday of the new Lunar year. It is the original and primary location of Melbourne's CNY festival, although the festival has expanded to multiple CBD sites in recent years, including Crown Casino. The celebrations feature traditional and contemporary Chinese cultural activities and festivities, dances, Chinese opera and singing, karaoke competition, numerous stalls of culinary delights, arts and crafts, Chinese chess competitions, calligraphy and children's events.

The Dai Loong Dragon Parade, as well as the main Lion Dances (performed by the Chinese Youth Society of Melbourne, Chinese Masonic Society and Hung Gar Martial Arts School) begin at roughly 10am on the Sunday following New Year, and run till roughly 4pm. The Dragon parade begins and ends at Melbourne's Chinese Museum.

=== Asian Food Festival ===
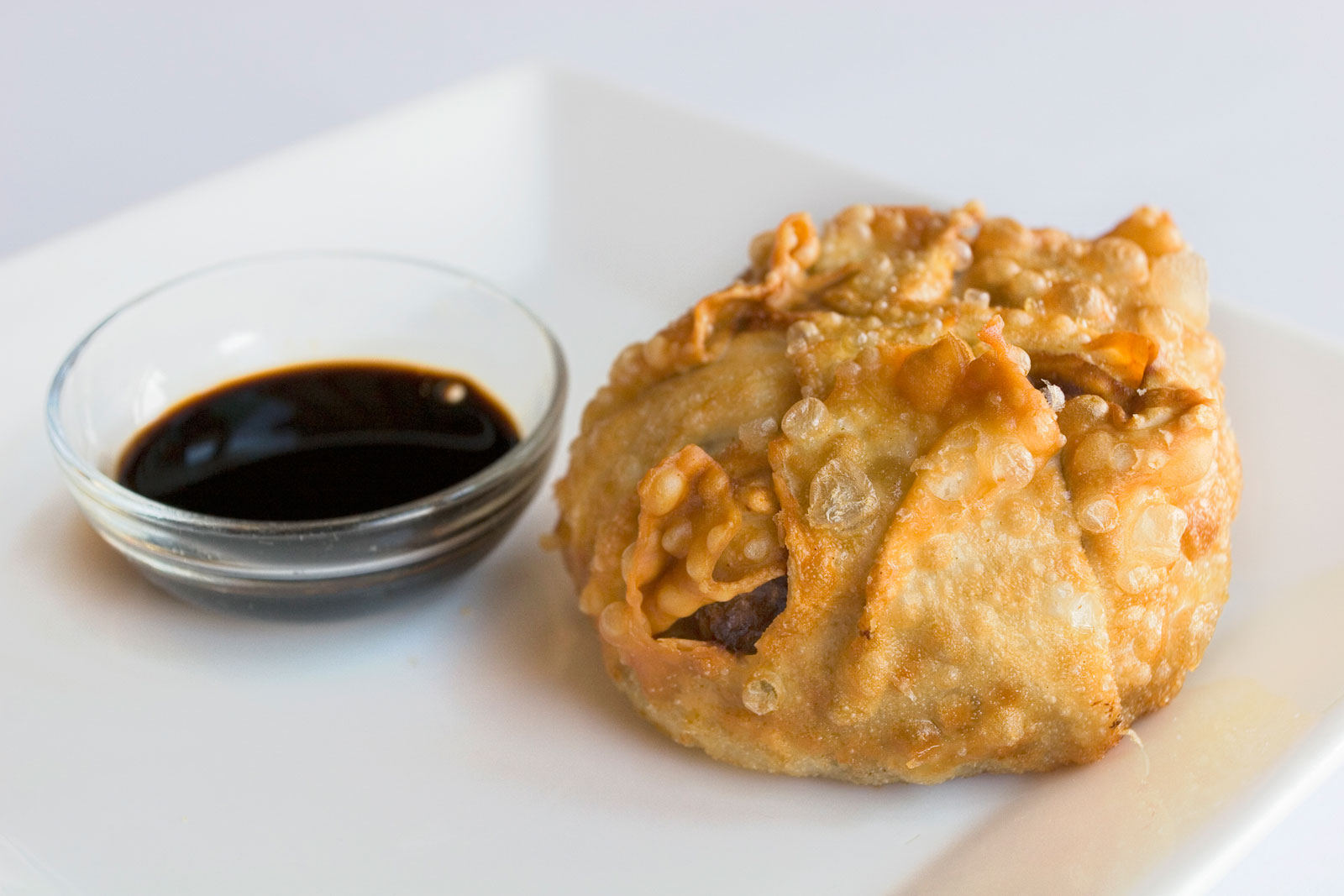
The dim sim, a popular example of Australian Chinese cuisine, originated in Chinatown

The Asian food festival is typically held in Spring and celebrates Asian cuisine with food tasting, stalls, cooking demonstrations, among others.

== Other Chinese communities ==
Beyond the original Chinatown in the CBD, several newer Chinese communities have developed in Melbourne's eastern suburbs, such as Box Hill, Glen Waverley and Springvale.

An older community, with links back to the 1850s gold rush, is to be found in the regional city of Bendigo, 150 km north-west of Melbourne.

== Cultural depictions ==
Tom Roberts, one of the leading figures of Australian Impressionism, created sketches of life in Little Bourke Street in the 1880s. During the Second World War, modernist Eric Thake created a series of works depicting Chinatown shopfronts, which now belong in the State Library of Victoria's painting collection.

Fergus Hume's The Mystery of a Hansom Cab (1886), one of the most famous mystery crime novels of the Victorian era, is based largely on the author's observations of life in Little Bourke Street, including the "dark recesses" of the Chinese Quarter, where Detective Kilsip, the novel's protagonist, pursues his suspect. Alfred Dampier's Marvellous Melbourne play of the same year features a scene in a Chinatown opium den.

Between 1909 and 1910, Melbourne's first Chinese-language newspaper, the Chinese Times, serialised Wong Shee Ping's novel The Poison of Polygamy, the first novel written in Literary Chinese to be published in Australia and possibly the West. Set in Victoria during the 1850s gold rush, the novel describes life in Chinatown.

Set in Little Bourke Street, Elinor Mordaunt's 1919 novel The Ginger Jar is about a love affair between a Chinese Australian hawker and a European woman.

A pivotal scene of the 1911 silent film The Double Event, directed by W. J. Lincoln, takes place in Melbourne's Chinatown.

The 1997 Hong Kong action film Mr. Nice Guy, starring Jackie Chan, is set in Melbourne, with several scenes shot in Chinatown.

Chinatown appears in episodes of the period detective drama series Miss Fisher's Murder Mysteries (2012–2015), including "Ruddy Gore" (episode 6, season 1), which focuses largely on Chinatown and its connection to the East End Theatre District.

== Gallery ==
=== Archways ===
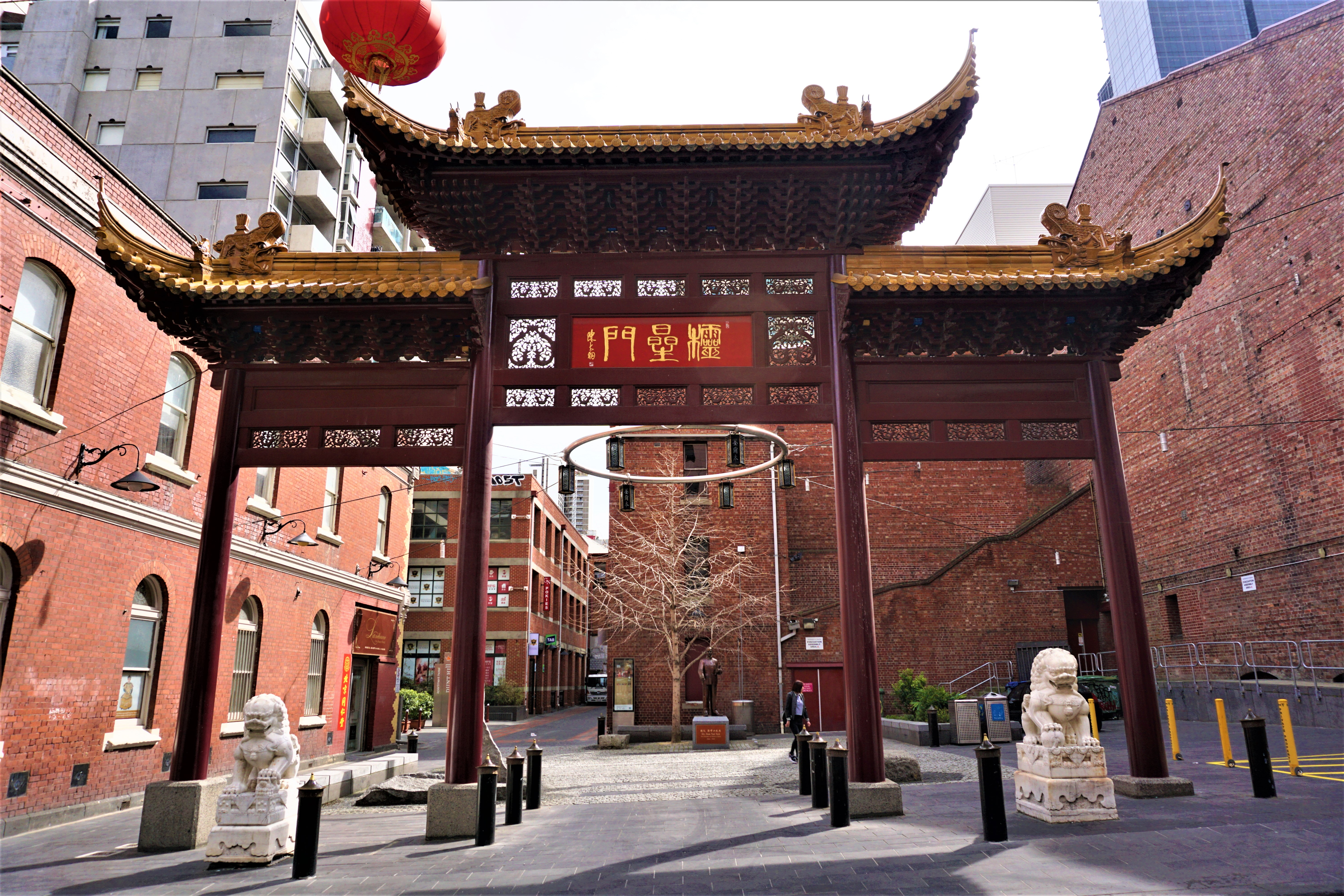
Cohen Place

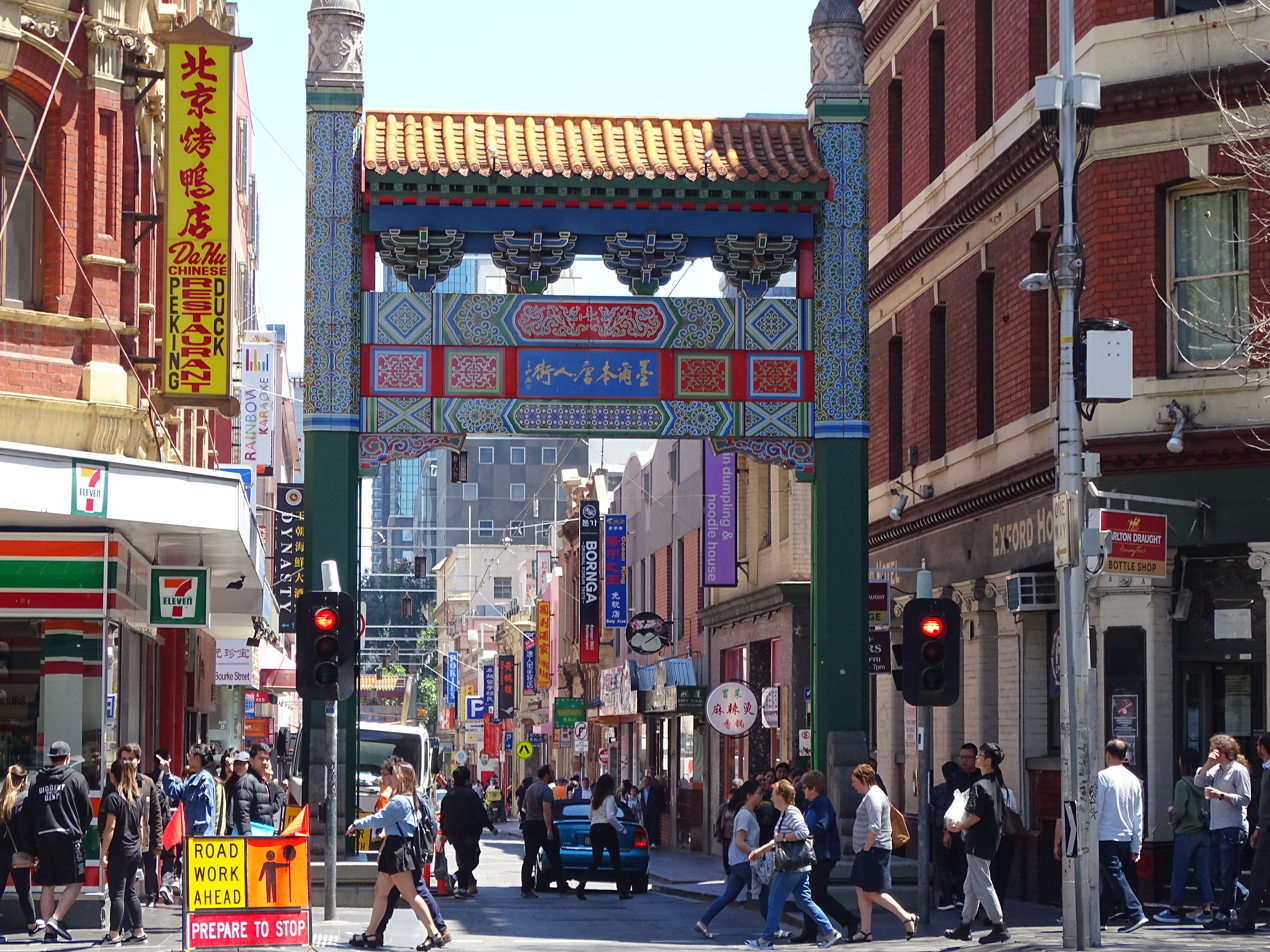
Russell Street

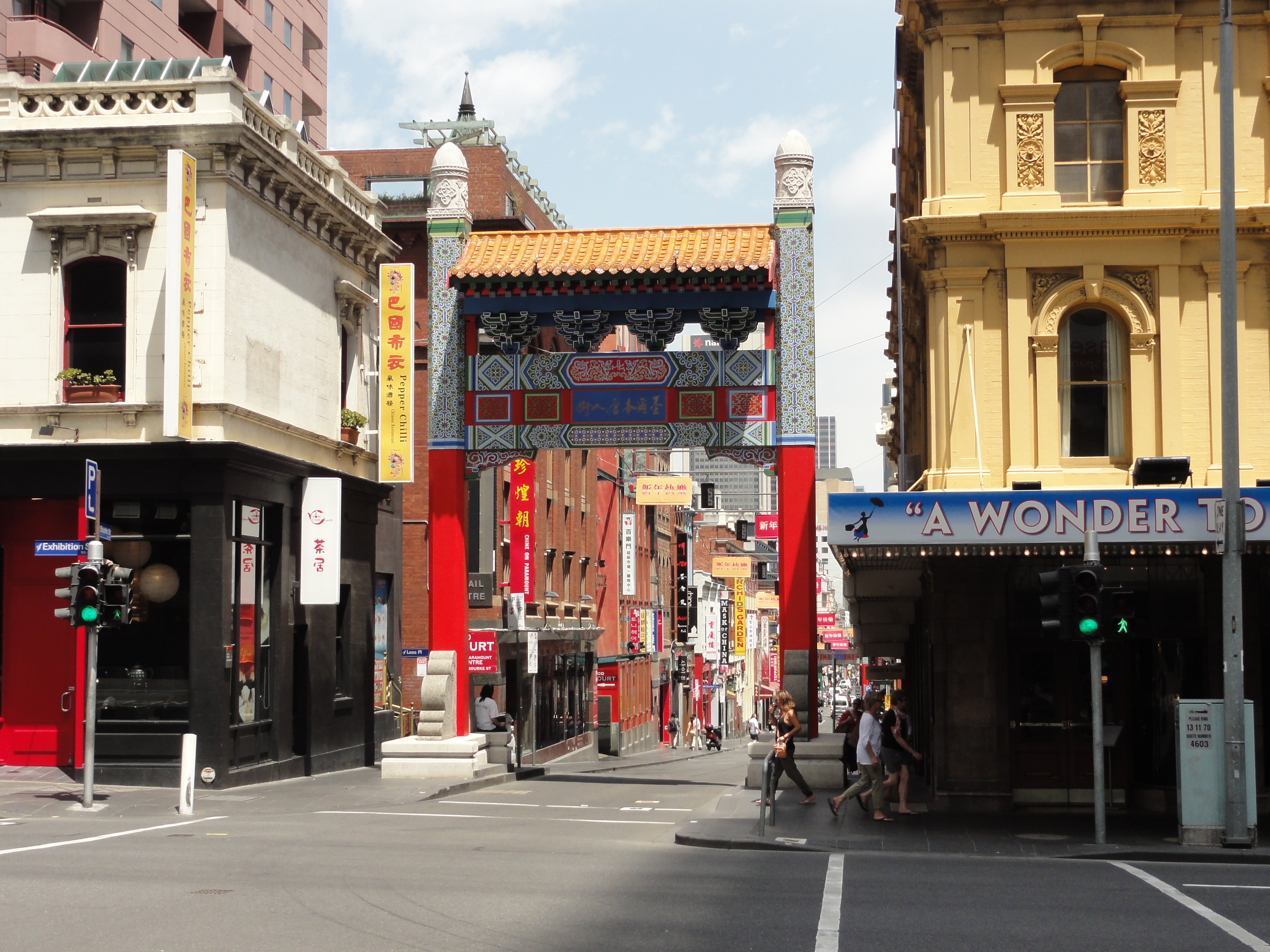
Exhibition Street

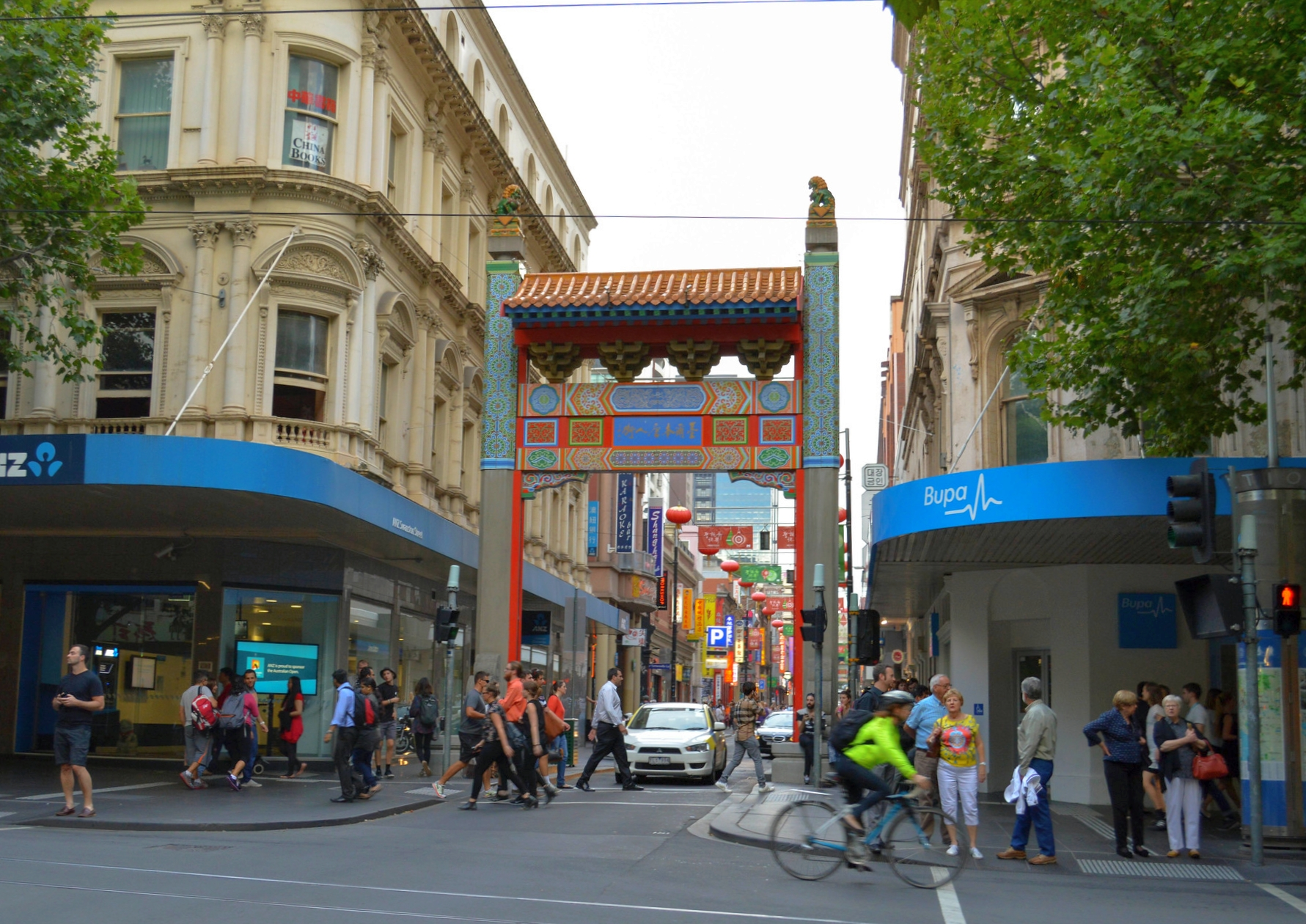
Swanston Street

=== Buildings ===
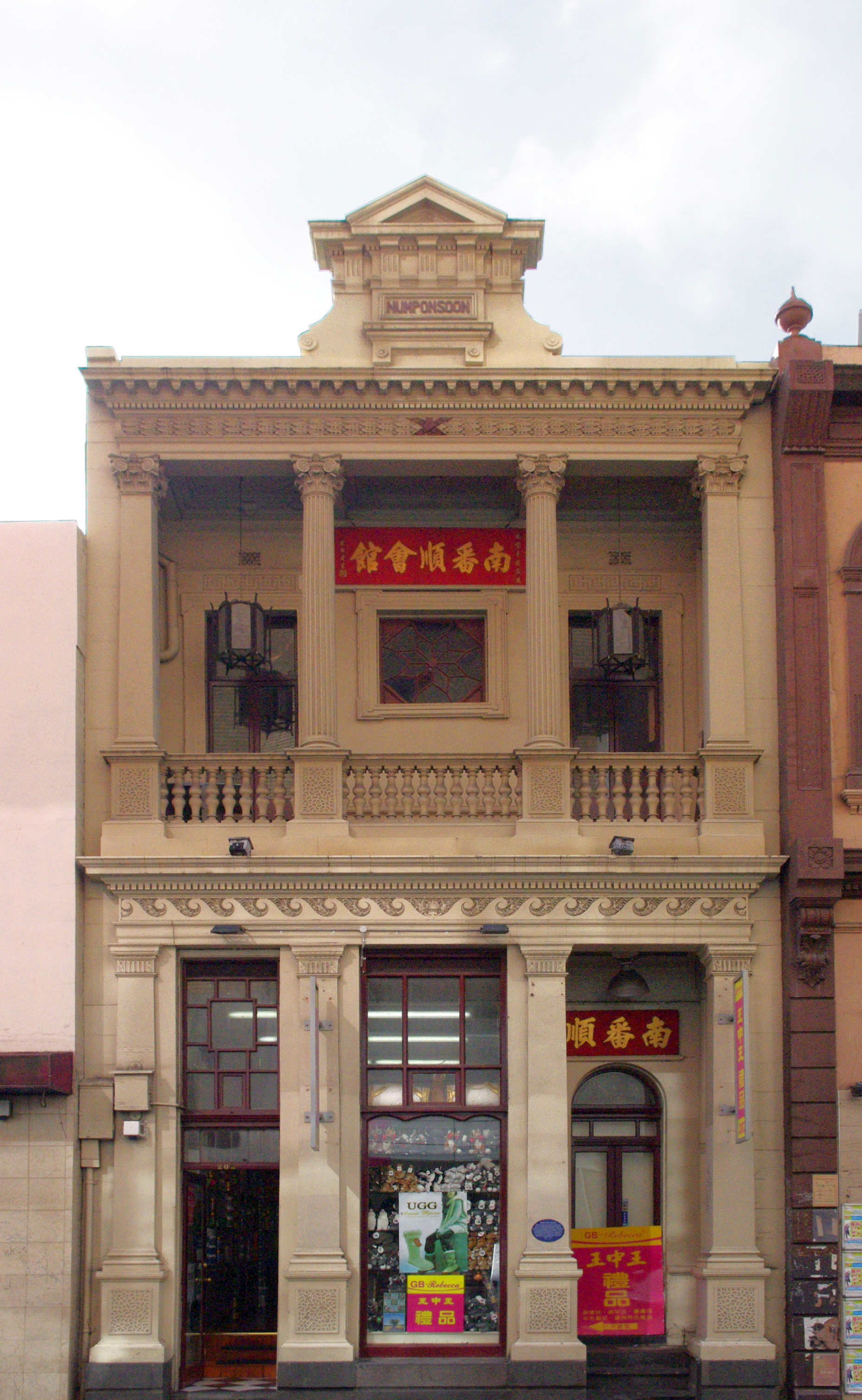
The Num Pon Soon building, built in 1861

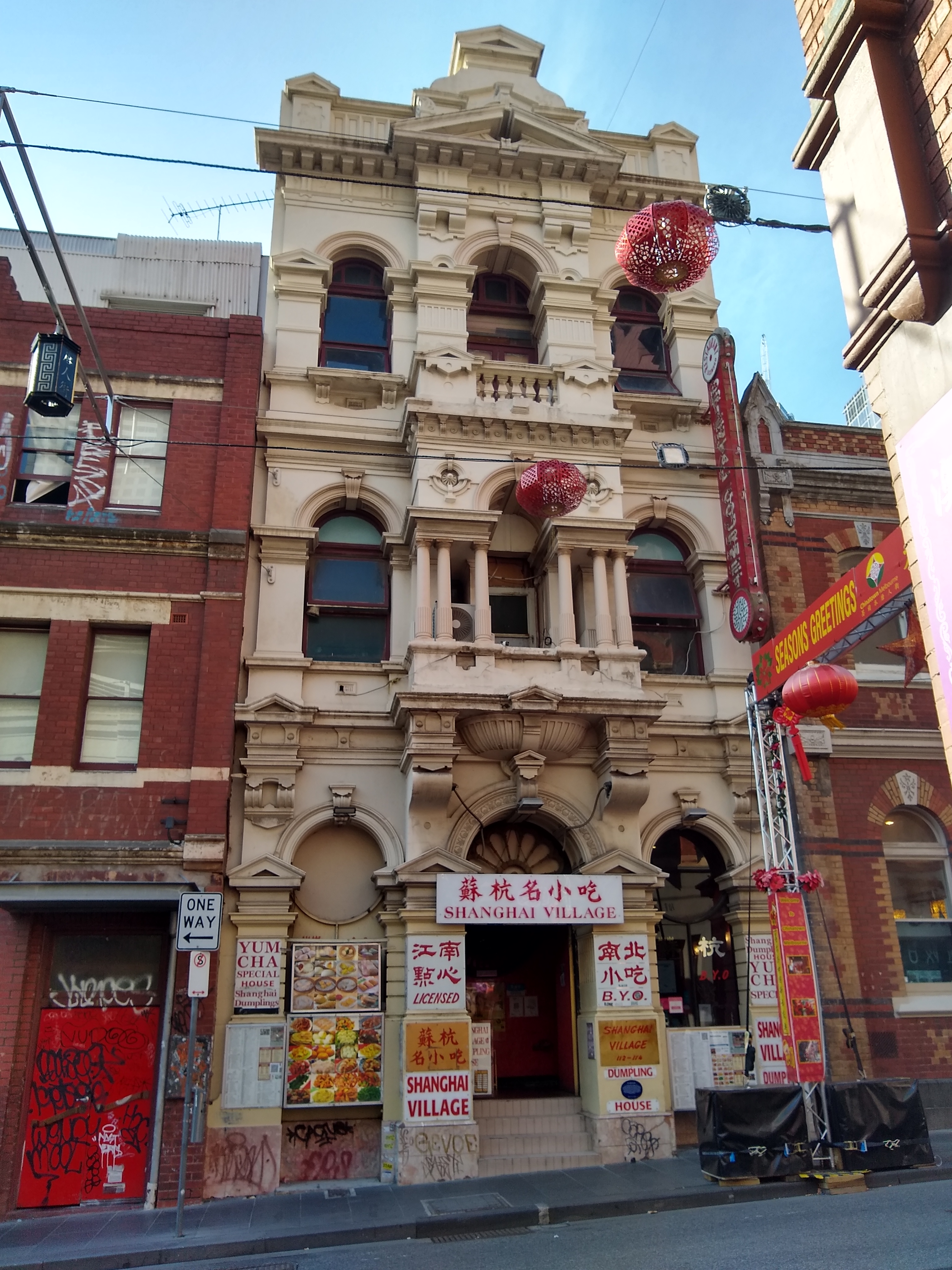
The Sum Kum Lee building, built in 1887, currently tenanted by the dumpling house Shanghai Village

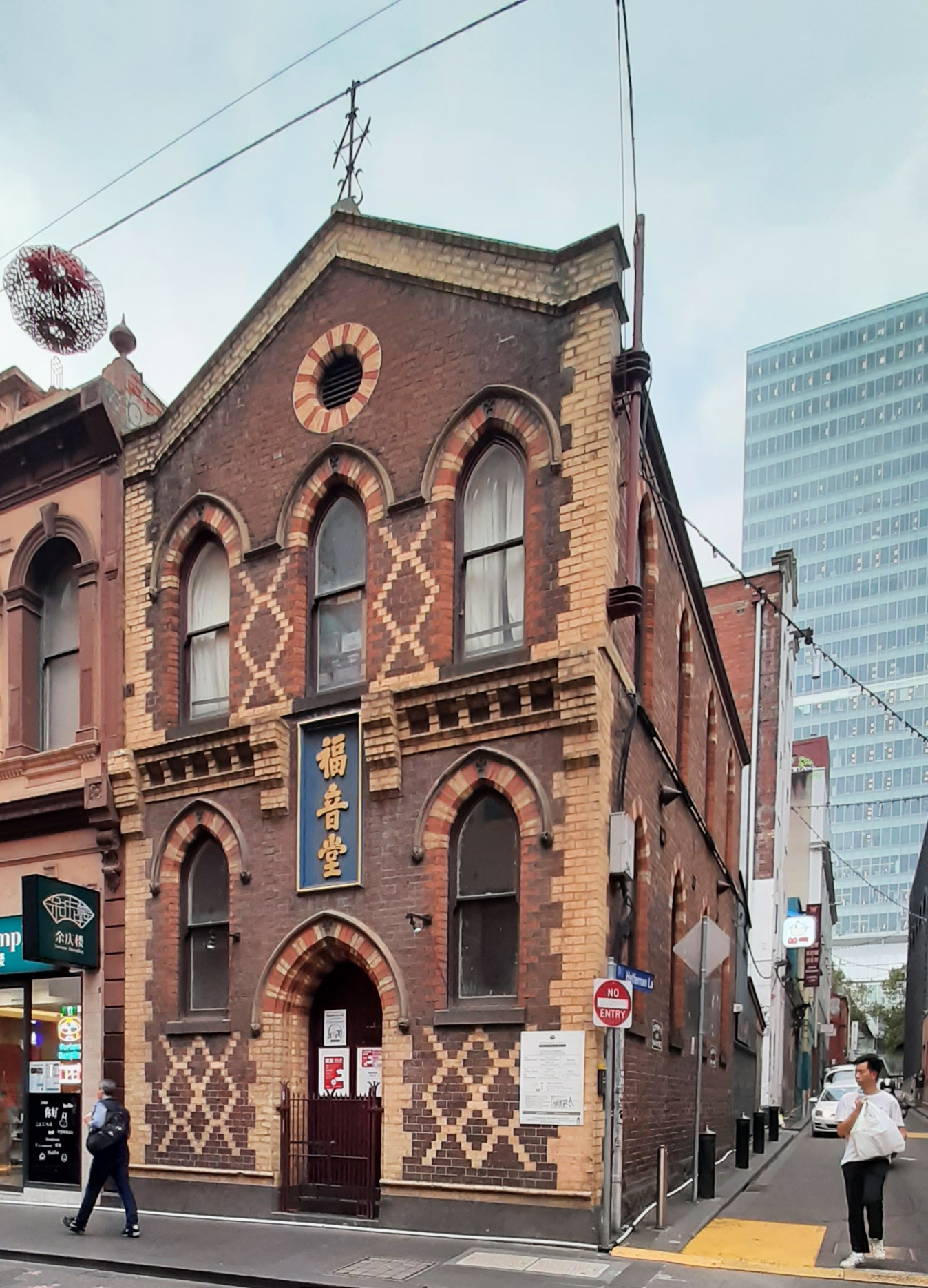
Gospel Hall Melbourne, the oldest Chinese church in Australia, and one of the oldest continually operating in the world

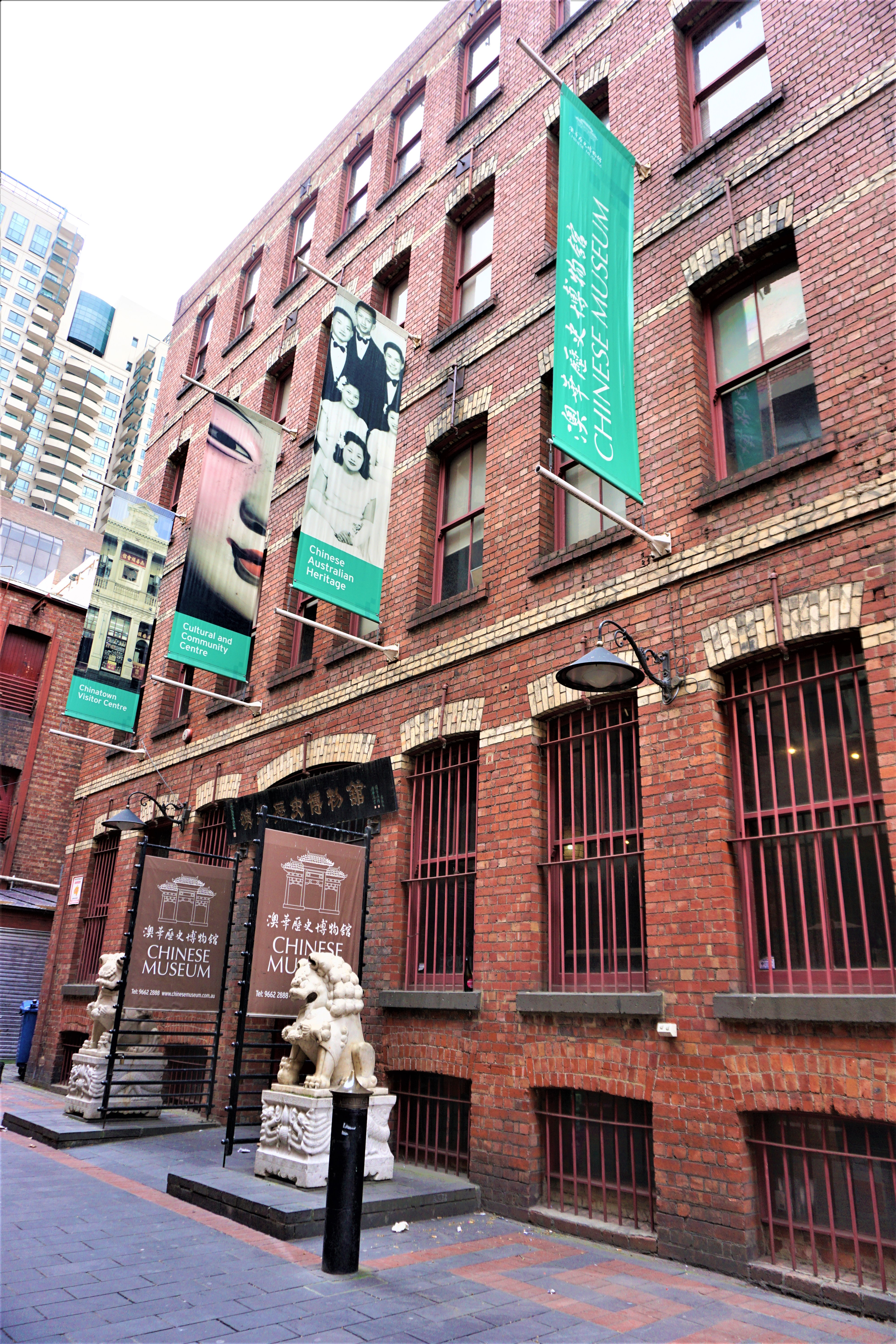
Chinese Museum, located in a converted warehouse, built in 1890

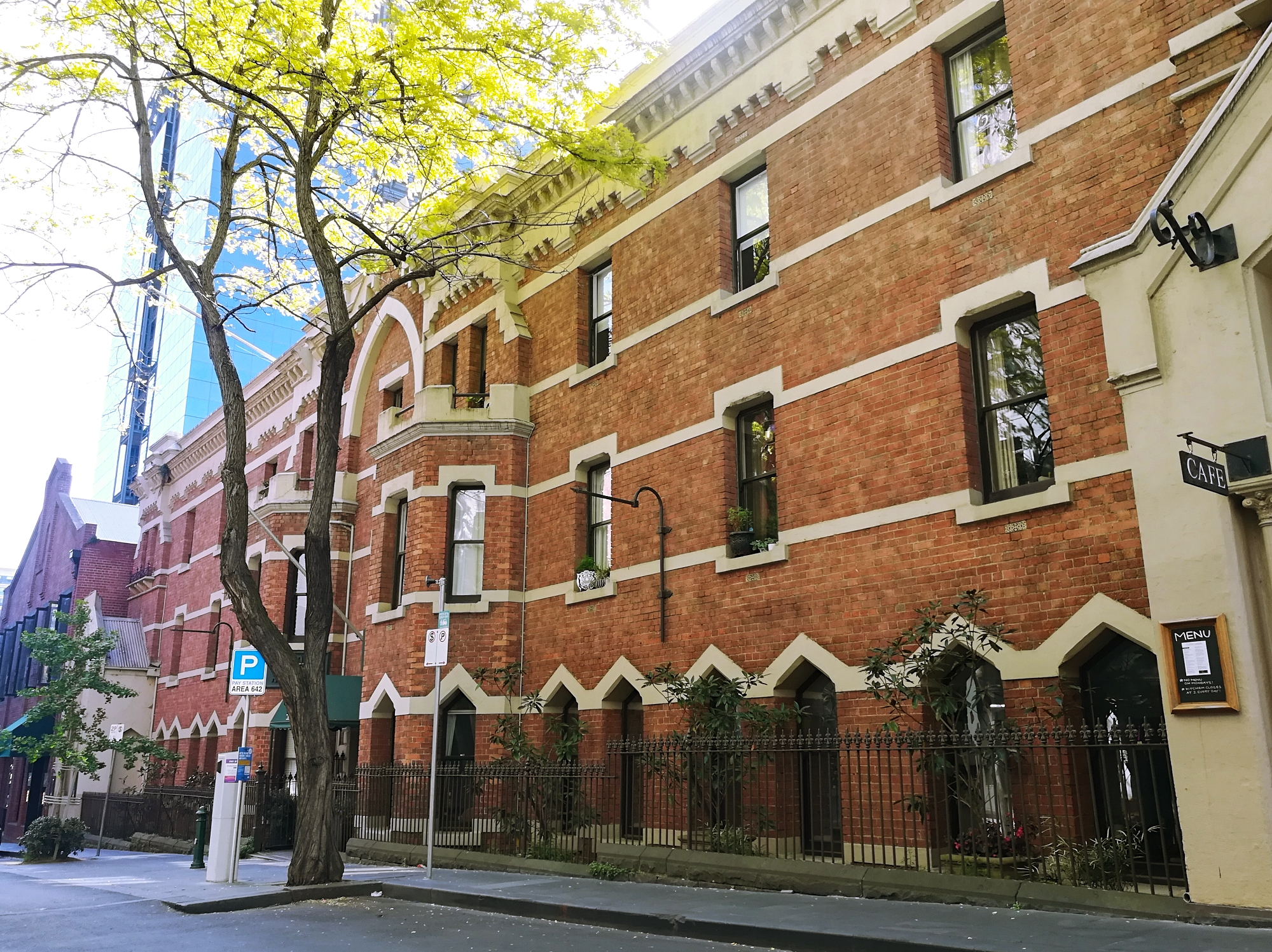
Tenements, built in 1884

=== Other sites ===
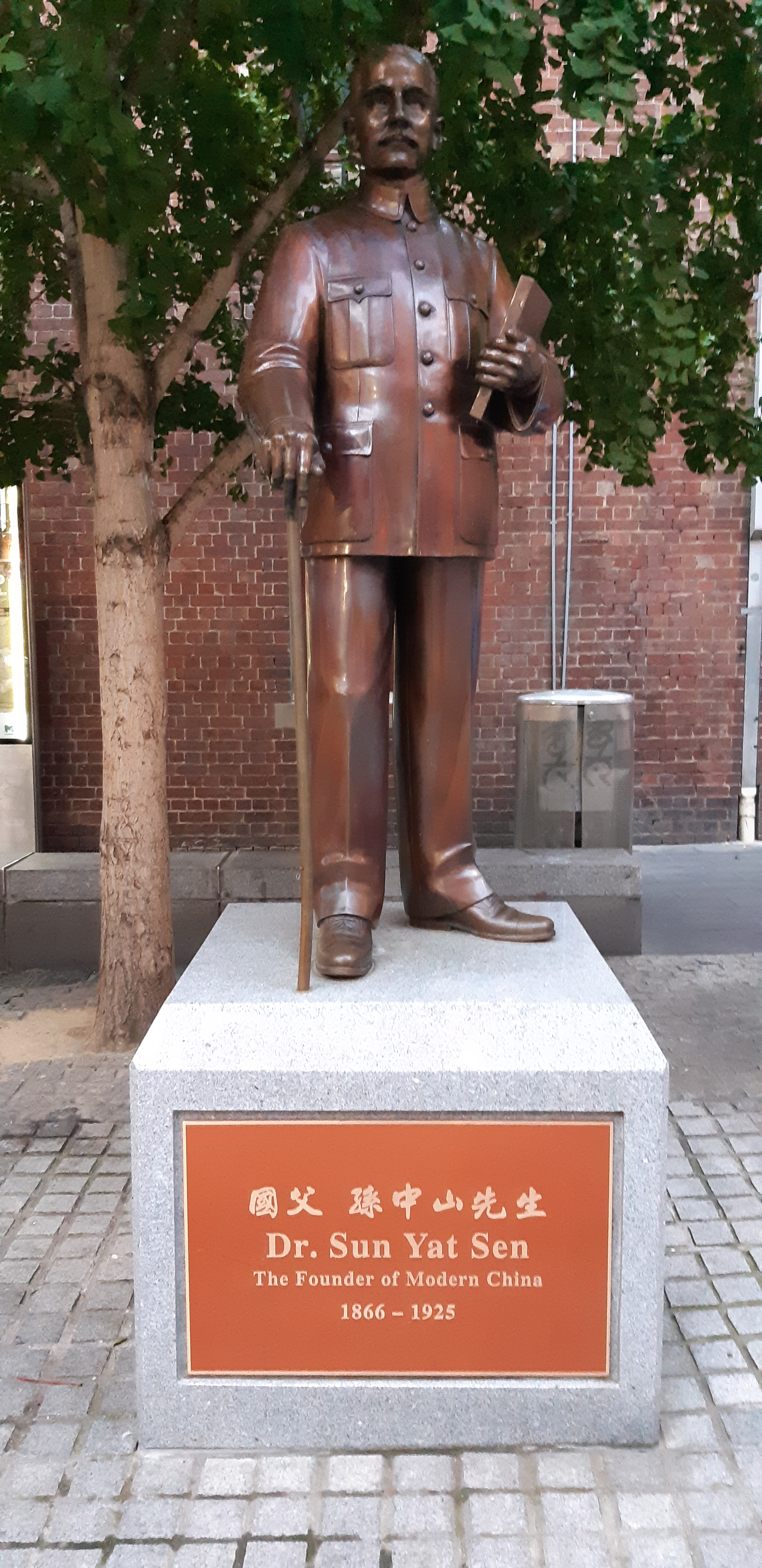
Statue of Sun Yat-sen

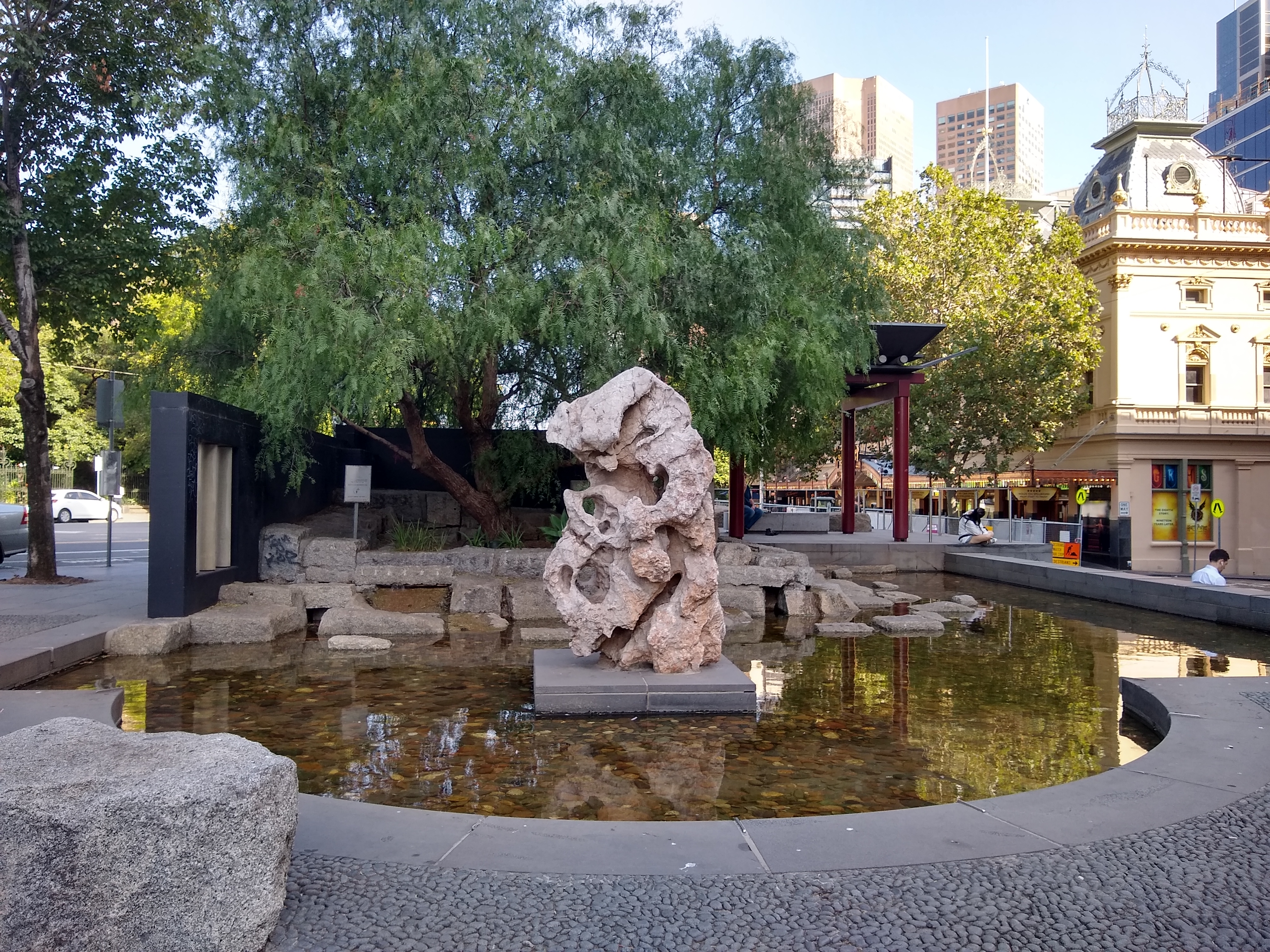
The Tianjin Garden on Spring Street

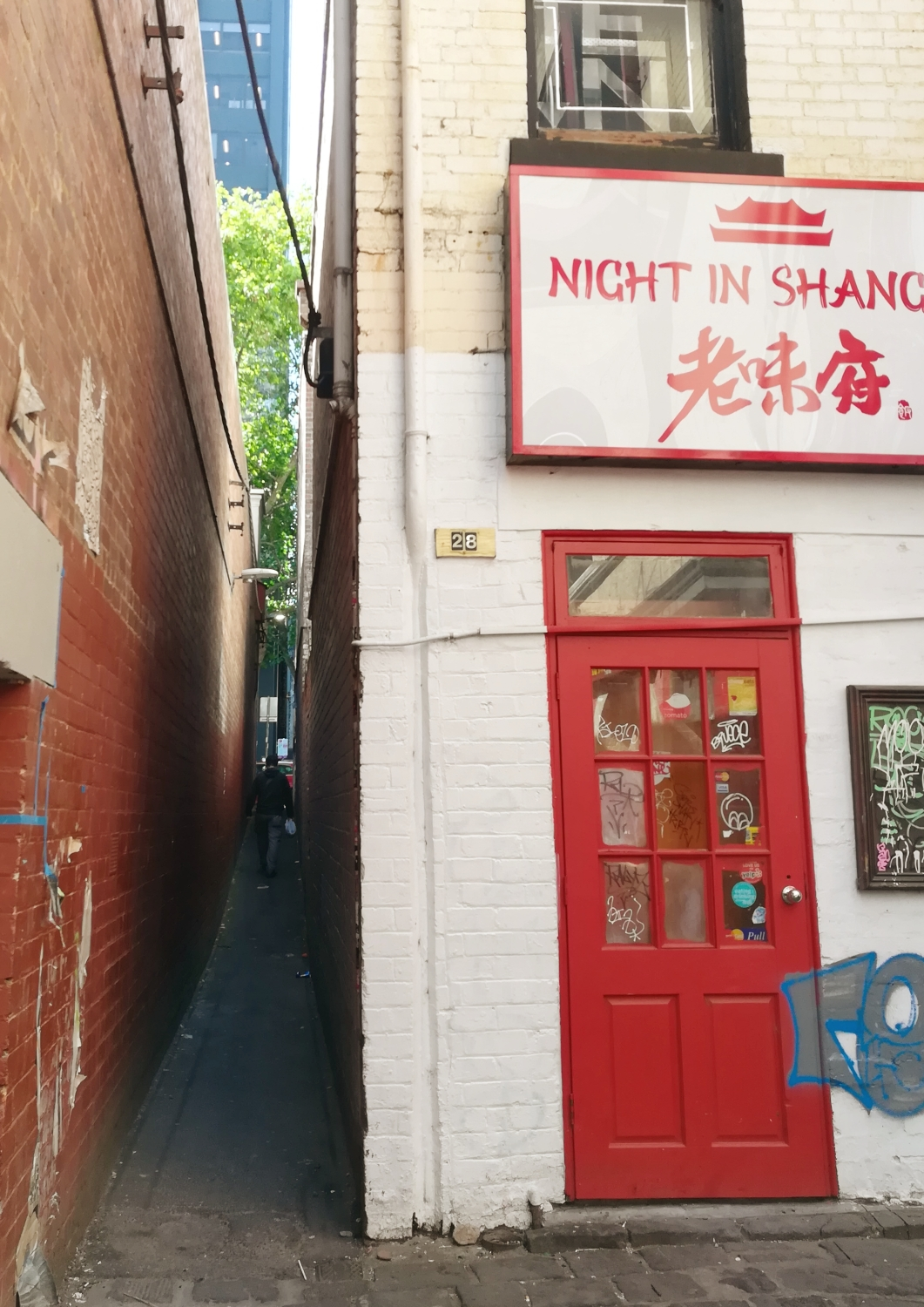
Corrs Lane, the CBD's narrowest laneway

== See also ==
- Heavenly Queen Temple (Melbourne)
- Chinese Museum, Melbourne

== Bibliography ==
Books

- McConville, Chris (2020). "Chinatown". In Davison, Graeme (ed.). The Outcasts of Melbourne. Taylor & Francis. ISBN 9781000248111.

Journals

Theses

Webpages
