= Statue of Sun Yat-sen (Melbourne) =

Statue of Sun Yat-sen in Melbourne, Victoria, Australia

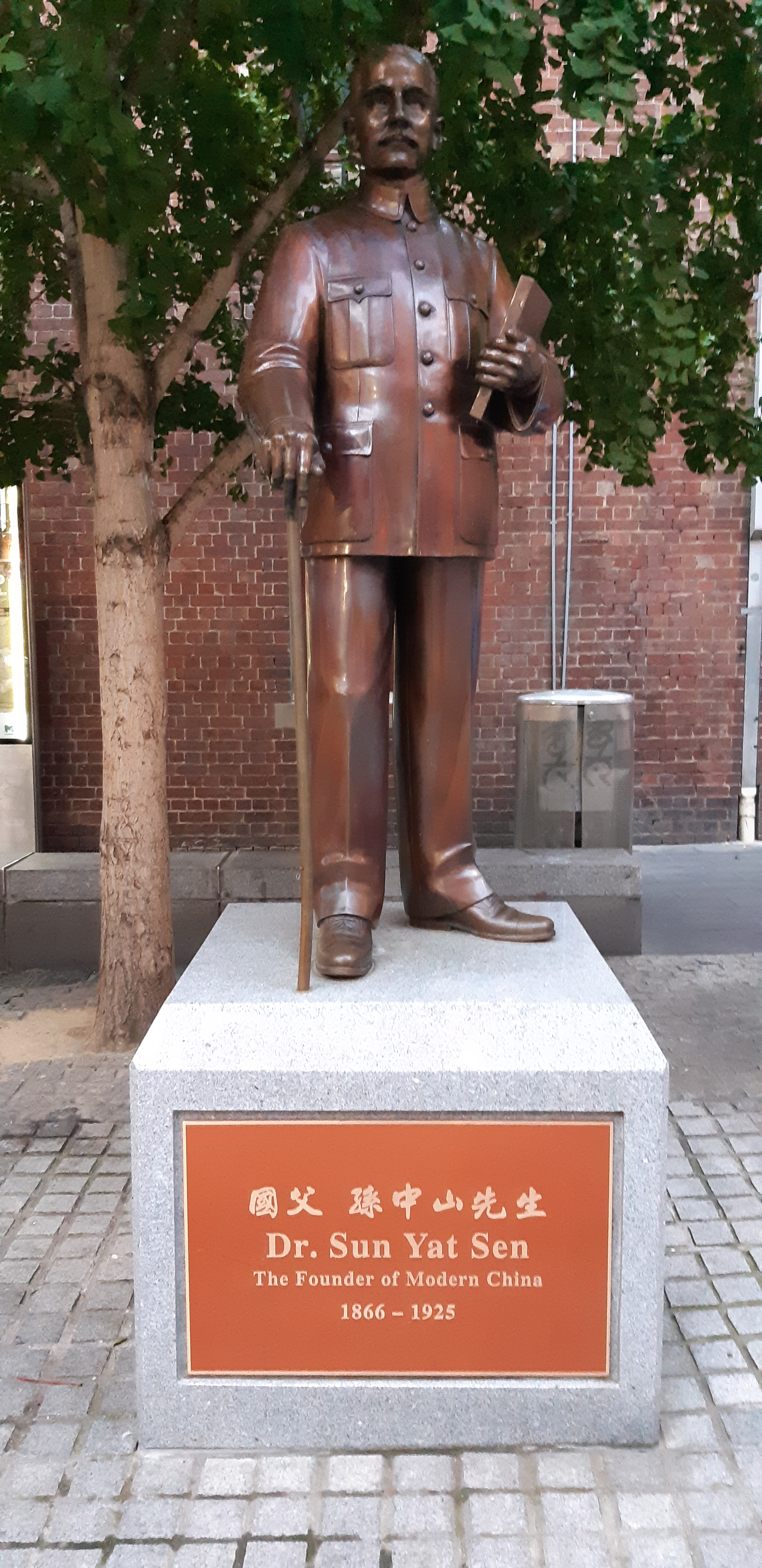
- The statue in 2019
- Year: 2011
- Medium: Sculpture
- Subject: Sun Yat-sen
- Dimensions: 300 cm (120 in)
- Location: Melbourne, Victoria, Australia; 37.811162°S 144.969303°E

Dr Sun Yat Sen is a bronze outdoor memorial sculpture depicting the Chinese physician, writer, and philosopher of the same name, installed outside the Chinese Museum in Melbourne's Chinatown, in the Australian state of Victoria.

The statue commemorates Dr Sun Yat-sen, a Chinese revolutionary and the first president and founding father of the Nationalist Republic of China, who played a significant role in the overthrow of the Qing Dynasty in the early 20th century, becoming the first provisional president when the Republic of China was formed in 1912. The statue depicts a standing Dr Sun wearing a Mao suit, with a cane in his right hand and a book on the Three Principles of the People in his left hand.

In celebration of the 100th anniversary of the founding of the Republic of China, the statue was installed in late 2011 by the Chinese community in Melbourne in memory of Dr Sun's huge contributions to the establishment of Republic of China. The statue was unveiled by the Chinese Youth Society of Melbourne in a Lion Dance Blessing ceremony, with the statue located outside the Chinese Museum's entrance on the spot where their traditional Chinese New Year Lion Dance always ends.

The statue's front inscription reads "Dr. Sun Yat Sen The Founder of Modern China 1866–1925", the back inscription reads "Respectfully erected by the Founding Committee of Dr. Sun Yat Sen Memorial Statue Inc and the Chinese Community of Australia 10 October 2011 Melbourne", the inscription on the left reads "The World is for All" and the inscription on the right reads "Love is for All".
