= Fook Shing =

19th C. Australian-Chinese community leader

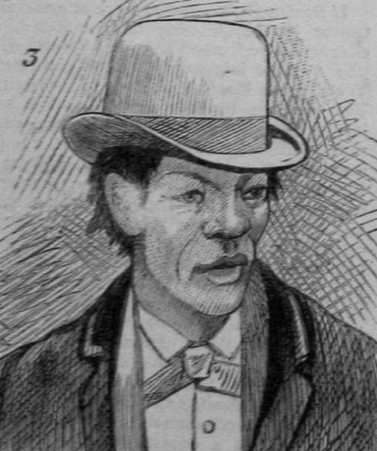
- Portrait of Fook Shing published in Britain's The Graphic, November 1880
- Born: Guangdong, China
- Died: 2 April 1896; Melbourne, Victoria, Australia
- Resting place: Melbourne General Cemetery

Fook Shing (died 2 April 1896), sometimes called Fok Sing, Fook Ching, Fook Sing, and Henry Fook Shing, was a Chinese Australian community leader in colonial Victoria. He is known for being the longest-serving Chinese member of the Australian colony's detective force, and for policing Melbourne's Chinatown.

== Early life ==
Fook Shing was born and raised in Guangdong, China, although the date and details of his early life are scarce. Shing joined tens of thousands of his countrymen in migrating to Australia at the height of the Victorian gold rush in the early 1850s. It appears he arrived in South Australia, before making his way to the goldfields on foot.

== On the goldfields ==
On the Bendigo goldfields, Shing took an active role in community life by serving the colonial government as a local "headman" (or "Chief of the Chinese"), campaigning against anti-Chinese sentiment, and running a touring theatre company.

Fook Shing had business interests on the Bendigo goldfields, including brickmaking at White Hills, which hosted a major Chinese camp. Having attained some wealth through a number of these enterprises, Fook Shing later became a naturalised British subject.

== Personal life ==
Fook Shing married at least twice. In July 1857, he married Ellen Mary Fling in a Christian ceremony at Melbourne's Congregational and Independent Church. Two years later, Ellen left Fook Shing without his consent — legally viewed as 'desertion' at the time. Following her departure, he published a public notice in the Melbourne newspapers warning the public that he would not be held responsible for any debts she incurred after leaving his household.

In 1879, he married another woman of the same first name: Ellen Moran, daughter of Ah Poo and Mary Moran, at a Baptist church in East Melbourne. The couple had two children: Evelyn Maud Fook Shing and Henry Bertie Fook Shing. Fook Shing later purchased a house and land in North Fitzroy that was registered in his wife's name.

== Melbourne's 'Chinese Detective' ==
Shing served on the Victorian Police force from the 1860s to the 1880s.

The Victoria Police relied on Shing as an interpreter, and in the 1860s he was officially appointed by the force, at first as an informant and later as the principal detective of Melbourne's Chinatown, centered in Little Bourke Street.

Known as the 'Chinese Detective', Shing lived and served there for the next twenty years while also taking up regular assignments in country Victoria and occasionally being sent interstate to pursue Chinese suspects.

Among European colonists, Shing was widely considered an authority on life in Chinatown, and served as a guide through the area for a number of journalists, including bohemian Marcus Clarke, who featured Shing in his "Night Scenes in Melbourne" articles for The Argus.

Fook was never promoted above his entry rank as a detective, possibly due to inherent racial bias, but also due to his growing reputation as an opium addict and "an inveterate gambler" at Chinatown's Fan-Tan houses.

Despite increasingly sensational media attention, as well as colleagues calling into question his work ethic, Shing's superiors frequently overlooked any moral failings and even paid for his supply of opium, seeing it as necessary to obtain information from the Chinese.

They occasionally assigned Shing to cases beyond those pertaining to the Chinese community, including the hunt for Ned Kelly and his gang.

== Retirement and death ==
By the 1880s, Fook's drug use had taken a toll on his health. In 1886, he was retired from the police force on compensation after being deemed unfit for further service. No successor was appointed in his place.

His retirement followed a period of personal loss. In 1885, Shing's first wife, Ellen, died aged 24 at their residence. His second wife died that same year. The ownership of their property subsequently became the subject of a Supreme Court case in 1887.

Following his retirement, Fook Shing returned to China, where he spent three years before returning to Melbourne in 1895.

Fook Shing died in 1896 after being admitted to a Bathurst hospital due to smoking excessive amounts of opium. By the time of his death, he had anglicized his name to Henry Fook Shing. He was buried in the Melbourne General Cemetery with his wife Ellen.

== Legacy ==
The fictional character Leung Wei Shing, portrayed by Chinese-New Zealand actor Yoson An in the 2021 SBS TV miniseries New Gold Mountain, was based on Detective Fook Shing. The series was set in the Victorian goldfields in the 1850s.

A restaurant 'Fook Shing' in Kyneton, Victoria, is also named after him. Located in the town's main restaurant street, it serves South-East Asian cuisine inside a historic gold rush-era building.

Taiwanese singer Jay Chou filmed the music video for his 2026 hit song "Gold Rush Town" at Victoria's Sovereign Hill. It depicts the experience of Chinese people during the Australian gold rush. Chou portrays a Chinese detective investigating a robbery, and historians have noted clear similarities between this character and Detective Shing.

== See also ==
- Chinese Australians
