= Cheok Hong Cheong =

Chinese-Australian missionary and activist (1851–1928)

The Reverend Cheok Hong Cheong
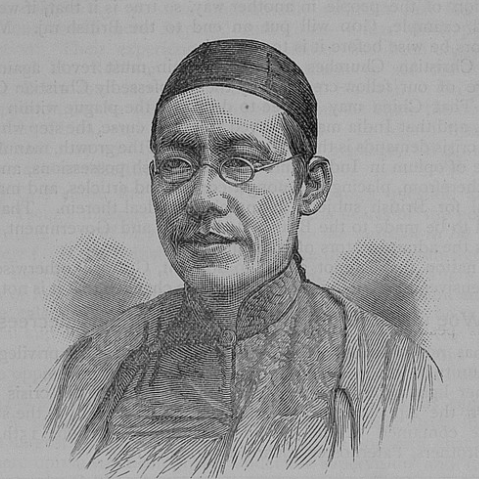
- Cheong c. 1892

Personal details
- Born: 23 November 1851 Foshan, Guangdong, Qing China
- Died: 20 June 1928 (aged 76) Croydon, Victoria, Australia
- Parents: Cheong Peng-nam; Yeet Kwy Phang See
- Spouse: Wong Toy Yen (m. 1869; died 1927)
- Occupation: Missionary

Cheok Hong Cheong
- Traditional Chinese: 張卓雄
- Simplified Chinese: 张卓雄
Transcriptions
Standard Mandarin
- Hanyu Pinyin: Zhāng Zhuōxióng
- Wade–Giles: Chang1 Cho1-hsiung2
Yue: Cantonese
- Jyutping: Zoeng^{1} Coek^{3} Hung^{4}
- IPA: [tsœŋ˥ tsʰœk̚˧.hʊŋ˩]

Cheok Hong Cheong (Note: Cheong initially used his Chinese name "Cheong Cheok Hong" but "was irritated by being called Mr. Hong" and thereafter referred to himself as "Cheok Hong Cheong" when writing in English.) (23 November 1851 – 20 June 1928) was a Chinese-born Australian missionary, political activist, writer, and businessman. Originally a Presbyterian elder, he became the superintendent of the Anglican mission in Melbourne. A staunch campaigner against anti-Chinese sentiment in Australia, he co-authored a booklet titled The Chinese Question in Australia (1879) with Lowe Kong Meng and Louis Ah Mouy. He was also opposed to the British opium trade.

== Early life and education ==
Cheong was born on 23 November 1851 in Foshan, Guangdong, China. His grandfather was a banker whose business collapsed after the Taiping Rebellion. His father, Cheong Peng-nam, arrived in Victoria, Australia in 1854 during the Victorian gold rush, and converted to Christianity in 1860. Cheok Hong had two sisters, Fong-sen and Ah Chin; in 1863, after his father had become permanently employed as a Presbyterian missionary in Australia, Cheong emigrated to Victoria with his mother Yeet Kwy Phang See and his siblings. They were all baptised at St John's Presbyterian Church in Ballarat in 1866.

Following the death of Cheong's mother in June 1871, the family relocated to Melbourne. Cheong's studies were reportedly so exceptional that his tuition fees were borne by his teachers. He spent two years at Ballarat College and another three at Scotch College. He was admitted into the University of Melbourne in 1875, becoming the first Chinese in Victoria to matriculate, although he did not attend, much less graduate.

== Career ==
Cheong studied at the Presbyterian Theological Hall on a scholarship from the Presbyterian Church, although he dropped out midway in 1875, after a dispute regarding the Chinese mission that he worked at. From 1875 to 1885, Cheong sold bananas with his father in Fitzroy. In 1879, with his father's friend Lowe Kong Meng and fellow community leader and mentor Louis Ah Mouy, Cheong published a thirty-one-page pamphlet titled The Chinese Question in Australia, which defended Chinese immigration and protested against the discrimination that the Chinese had been facing in Australia. According to writer Ian Welch, Cheong was the main author of the document, with Ah Mouy and Kong Meng "approving" its contents. In an interview with The Essex County Standard, Cheong pushed back against xenophobic attitudes towards Chinese immigration and opined that China was a pacifist country, "having manifested no desire to covet her neighbours' territories." In 1885, Cheong accepted a salaried position at the Church Missionary Society of Victoria. The same year, after impressing Bishop James Moorhouse with "such a remarkable address" at the Anglican Board of Missions' annual meeting, Cheong was appointed as the superintendent of the Church of England of Melbourne, which necessitated his giving up of his role as a Presbyterian elder.

In 1887, two Imperial Commissioners, General Wong Yung Ho and Commissioner U Tsing, arrived in Melbourne as part of their inquiry into the treatment of Chinese subjects overseas. The trio of Cheong, Kong Meng, and Ah Mouy presented the commissioners with a petition that had forty-four other signatories, calling for the "international wrong" that was anti-Chinese sentiment in Australia to be righted. Cheong was particularly opposed to the Immigration Restriction Act 1901. He was the president of the Commonwealth Chinese Community's Representative Committee, which had been founded in direct response to the act. He was also a vociferous critic of the British opium trade, which he described as "pernicious", and travelled across England to lecture on the subject. Cheong claimed to have received death threats because of his anti-opium activism.

== Personal life ==
Although he had arrived in Australia with no knowledge of the language, Cheong was eventually able to speak and write in "perfect English". He was also proficient in French, German, Italian, and Spanish and "had more than a passing acquaintance" with Malay and Hindustani. A March 1927 report by the Sydney-based Smith's Weekly alleged that Cheong was the "wealthiest Chinaman in Melbourne", with numerous properties to his name.

In 1869, Cheong married Wong Toy Yen, with whom he had two daughters and five sons. She died on 14 February 1927; Cheong died a year later on 20 June 1928 at his residence "Pine Lodge", in Croydon, Victoria. The Brisbane Courier celebrated him as "one of the foremost Chinese citizens in Australia".
