= Commercial Bank of Australia =

Australian and New Zealand retail bank

- Industry: Banking
- Founded: 1866
- Defunct: 1982
- Fate: Merged with Bank of New South Wales
- Successor: Westpac
- Headquarters: Melbourne, Victoria, Australia
- Area served: Australia and New Zealand
- Key people: Lowe Kong Meng; Louis Ah Mouy
- Products: Consumer Banking

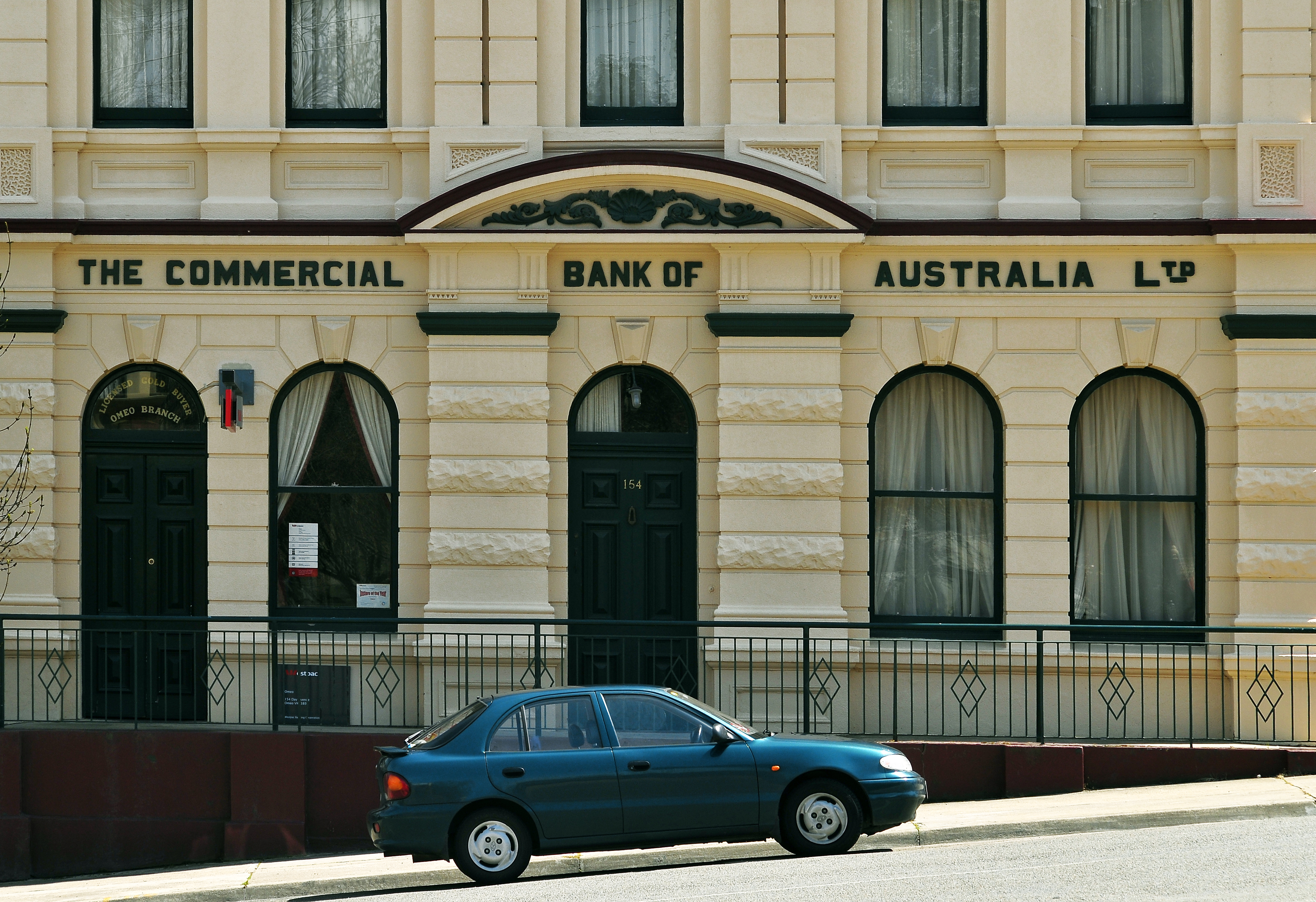
Commercial Bank of Australia

The Commercial Bank of Australia Limited (CBA) was an Australian and New Zealand retail bank which operated from 1866 until it merged with the Bank of New South Wales, which was established in 1817, to form the Westpac Banking Corporation in 1982.

== History ==
The first prospectus of the Commercial Bank of Australia was published on 16 March 1866. The initial capital was £500,000 in fifty thousand shares at £10 each. The first chairman of the bank's board of directors was Gideon S. Lang. In addition to Gideon Lang, the first directors were John Mackenzie, Thomas Mitchell and L. J. Sherrard. A provisional committee was made up of the four directors plus Mars Buckley, W. A. Broadribb, Thomas Cherry, James Copeland, Lowe Kong Meng, Matthew McCaw, Louis Ah Mouy, Sir Francis Murphy, Adam Stacpoole, Sylvester O'Sullivan, T. J. Thomas, David E. Wilkie and Benjamin Williams. Murphy, Wilkie and Williams were members of the Victorian Legislative Council.

The first general manager of the bank was George Valentine. He was succeeded early in 1870 by Henry Gyles Turner.

Lake and Reynolds write that Lowe Kong Meng and Louis Ah Mouy were "founding director(s) and major shareholder(s) of the Commercial Bank of Australia." As banks could issue their own paper currency at the time, the bank printed Chinese text on their pound note to encourage Chinese custom.

The Commercial Bank of Australia was headquartered for its entire existence at what is now 327-343 Collins Street, Melbourne. A grand premises was built in 1891–93, including a dramatic domed banking chamber.

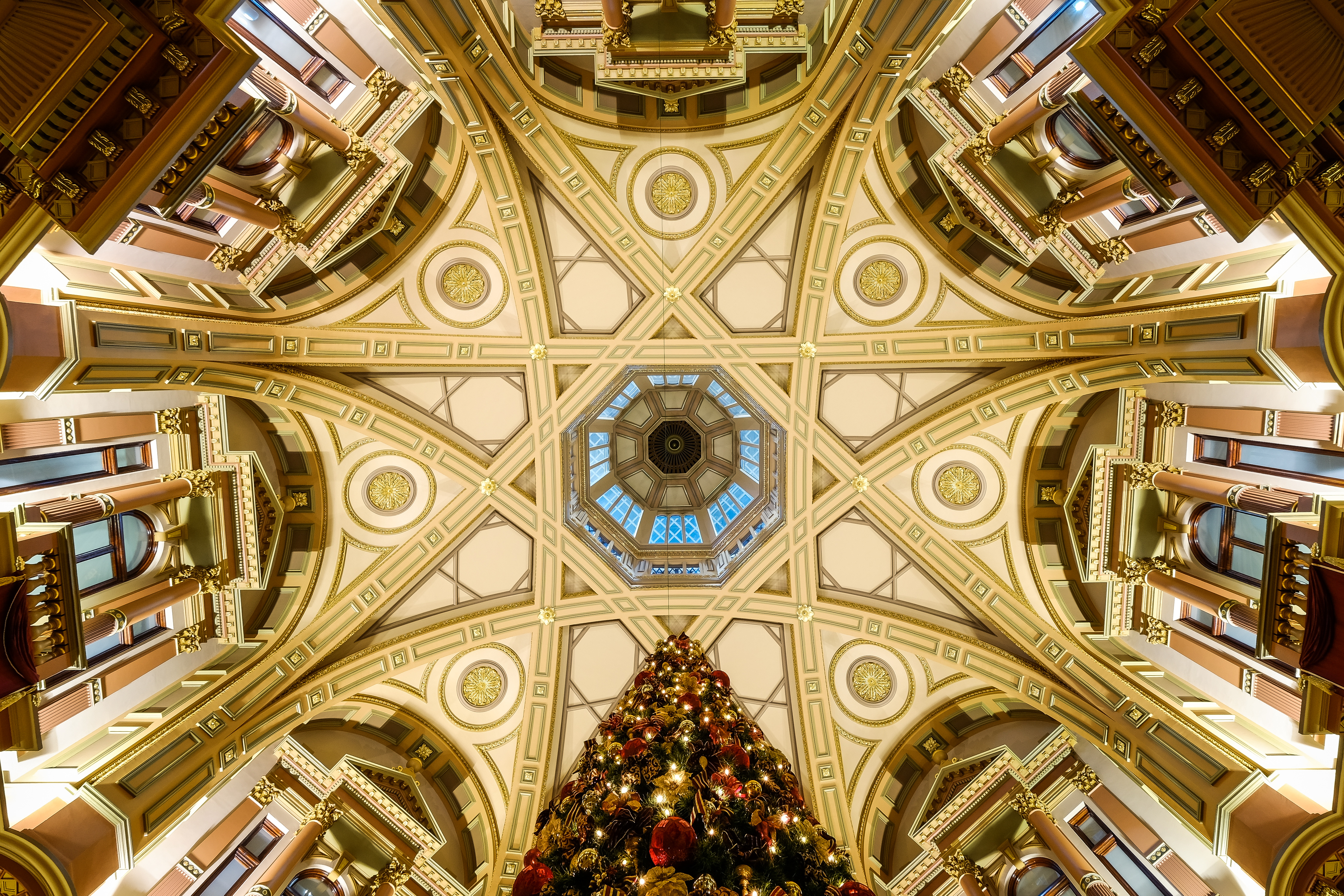
Rotunda in 333 Collins Street, Headquarters of the Commercial Bank of Australia

In 1939 the Collins Street frontage was rebuilt, and the chamber and entrance were heritage listed in the 1970s. The site was redeveloped as 333 Collins Street in 1990, with a tower constructed over the domed chamber, and the facade rebuilt to resemble the 1983 facade, and preserving the original entrance.

== Acquisition ==
It acquired the Australian and European Bank in 1879 and the National Bank of Tasmania in 1918. It commenced operations in New Zealand in 1912.

== Amalgamation ==
It amalgamated with the Bank of New South Wales to form Westpac in 1982.
