= Chinese Museum, Melbourne =

Museum of Chinese Australian History
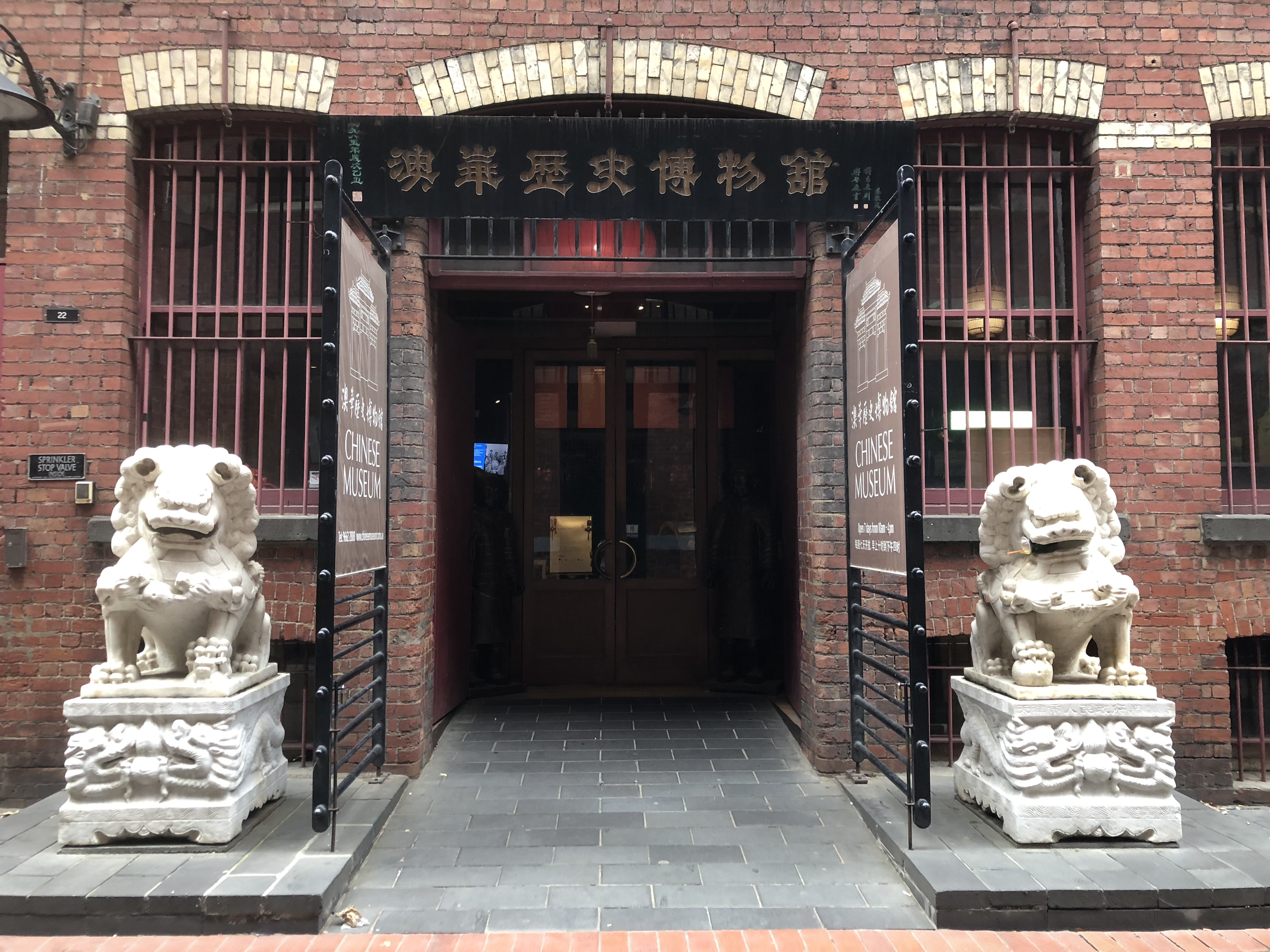
- Main entrance to the Chinese Museum
- Location: 22 Cohen Place, Melbourne, Victoria, Australia
- Coordinates: 37.810800°S 144.969099°E
- Type: History museum
- Curator: Joyce Agee
- Website: www.chinesemuseum.com.au

Chinese Museum, Melbourne
- Traditional Chinese: 澳華歷史博物館
- Simplified Chinese: 澳华历史博物馆
Transcriptions
Standard Mandarin
- Hanyu Pinyin: Ào Huá Lìshǐ Bówùguǎn
Yue: Cantonese
- Jyutping: ou3 waa4 lik6 si2 bok3 mat6 gun2

The Chinese Museum or Museum of Chinese Australian History is an Australian history museum located in Melbourne's Chinatown. The museum was established in 1985 with a charter to present the history of Australians of Chinese ancestry, and is dedicated to documenting, preserving and displaying the history, heritage and culture of Australia's Chinese community. An extensive refurbishment funded by the Victorian Government was completed in 2010. Since then, the museum has also acted as a Chinatown Visitor Centre.

The building that currently houses the museum was built by the Cohen Bros in 1890 and used as a warehouse for the manufacture of furniture. It was later sold to Her Majesty's Theatre and used as a storage space for their extensive collection of costumes. In 1984 the Victorian Government, with support from the Victorian Tourism Commission, the Chinese Community and the Melbourne City Council the building was purchased from Her Majesty's Theatre and the museum formally established. There is temporary exhibition space in which local and international artists can present work that engages with the Chinese culture.

The museum has a range of permanent exhibitions relating to Chinese experiences in the 19th century Australian Goldfields and uses objects from their extensive collection to tell stories that highlight the relationships between Australians and Chinese culture. Across five floors, the Chinese Museum holds an extensive collection of Chinese clothing and textiles, photographs, documents and artifacts that reflect the social fabric and activities of the Chinese community in Australia from the 1850s. The fifth floor houses the One Million Stories Exhibition, which details Australia's Chinese history and showcases the contribution Chinese Australians have made to Australian Society over 200 years, including the story of recent arrivals from the Asia Pacific region. The fourth floor houses the museum's temporary exhibition gallery. At the basement, there is the Finding Gold experience, which tells the story about the life of Chinese miners on the Victorian goldfields. On the ground floor is the Dragon Gallery, which is home to Dai Loong and the Millennium Dragon, the largest Chinese dragon in the world. The commissioning Dai Loong has been credited with reviving the lost craft of dragon-making in the Chinese city of Foshan in the late 1970s; Chinese dragon production in the city was halted from 1949 due to cultural suppression, so samples from Melbourne's parade dragons were delivered to the descendant of a dragon craftsman, with the subsequent work on Melbourne's dragons resulting in the revival of the dormant industry.

The museum has over 8,000 items such as household items, tools, and clothing, The collection also includes fifty oral history recordings, as well as films, documents, and photographs.
