= Little Bourke Street =

Street in Melbourne, Victoria

Little Bourke Street Victoria
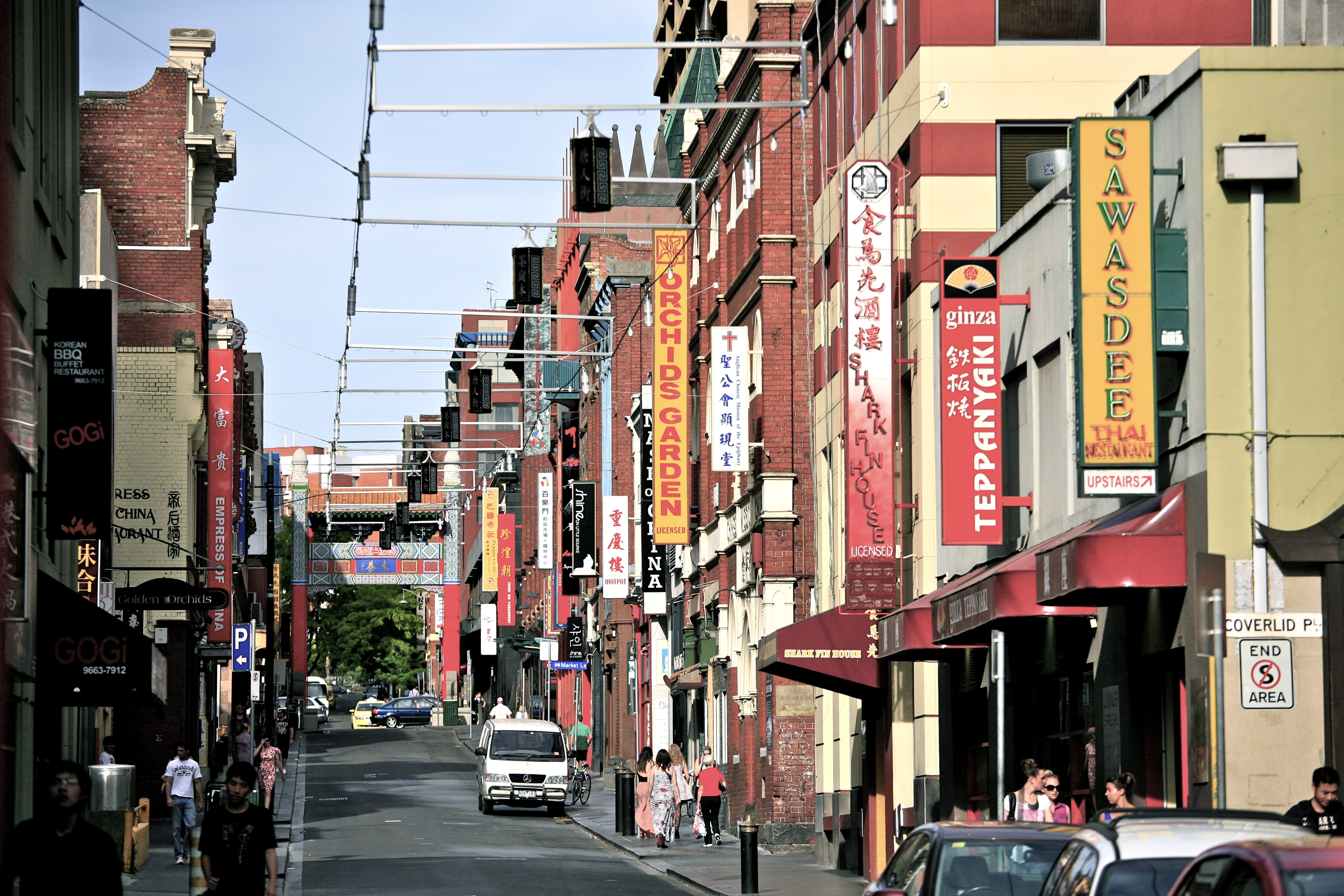
- Little Bourke Street between Russell and Exhibition Streets
- Coordinates: 37.8131°S 144.9634°E

General information
- Type: Street
- Length: 2 km (1.2 mi)

Major junctions
- West end: Spencer Street; Melbourne CBD
- King Street; William Street; Queen Street; Elizabeth Street; Swanston Street; Russell Street; Exhibition Street
- East end: Spring Street; Melbourne CBD

Location(s)
- LGA(s): City of Melbourne
- Suburb(s): Melbourne CBD

Little Bourke Street in the Melbourne central business district runs roughly east–west within the Hoddle Grid. It is a one-way street heading in a westward direction. The street intersects with Spencer Street at its western end and Spring Street at its eastern end. Melbourne's Chinatown, which extends between the corners of Swanston and Exhibition streets, is a major feature of the street.

The street was once notorious for crime and prostitution, and in this capacity was used as a reference by Fergus Hume for his 1886 novel The Mystery of a Hansom Cab.
