= Louis Ah Mouy =

Chinese–Australian community leader and businessman (1826–1918)

- 雷亞枚
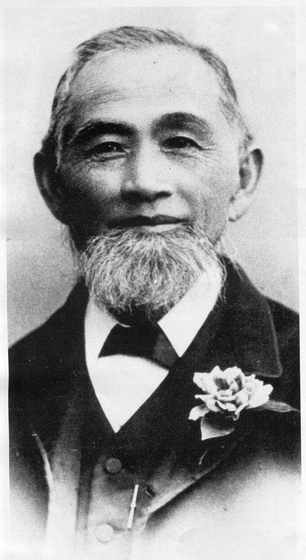
- Born: c. 1826; Guangzhou, China
- Died: 28 April 1918 (aged 92); Middle Park, Victoria
- Other names: Louey Amoy; Louey Ah Mouy
- Citizenship: Australian
- Occupations: Community leader, businessman
- Known for: Co-director of the Commercial Bank of Australia

Louis Ah Mouy (Chinese: 雷亞枚; Jyutping: Leoi^{4} Aa^{3} Mui^{4}; 1826 – 28 April 1918; also known as Louey Amoy and Louey Ah Mouy) was a Chinese–Australian community leader and businessman.

== Early life ==
Louis Ah Mouy was born circa 1826, in Guangzhou, China, and grew up in Singapore.

== Career ==
Ah Mouy emigrated to Victoria before the Victorian gold rush period, and served as a community leader of Melbourne's Chinese community. Considered as one of Melbourne's earliest Chinese immigrants, he also worked as a house constructor and a carpenter. It is claimed that the very first houses in South Melbourne and Williamstown were built by Ah Mouy, who at that time was working under contract for Captain Glendining. When gold was discovered in Yea, Ah Mouy decided to take up gold mining, at the same time urging his family back in China to join him. It was through gold mining that his wealth increased significantly, making him one of Melbourne's richest merchants of that time. He went on to open several gold mines across Australia. A letter addressed to his brother on the issue of gold in Victoria is claimed to have attracted some 37,000 Chinese compatriots to Victoria. As such, he is also called the "Father of the Chinese of Victoria". Ah Mouy was also the co-founder and a major shareholder of the Commercial Bank of Australia. Ah Mouy was an active campaigner against racism in Australia, when, it is said, that "racism had too strong a foothold".

== Personal life and death ==
Ah Mouy married Mary Rogers, a teenage Irish orphan, in Melbourne on 13 November 1855, with whom he had a daughter and a son. She died in Melbourne on 22 July 1862 at the age of 23 years.

Ah Mouy also married Ang Chuck in 1861. At the time of this marriage, Ang was only sixteen. They had eleven children, eight sons and three daughters. Ah Mouy died on 28 April 1918 at his home in Middle Park, aged 92.
