= History of Chinese Australians =

Significant Chinese emigration to Australia only began in earnest after the discovery of gold and the sequent gold rushes in Australia. This migration shaped and influenced Australian policies on immigration for over a century. While small numbers of Chinese settlers had arrived as early as 1818, the gold rush triggered a dramatic increase in their presence. However, existing prejudices and cultural misunderstandings led to conflict between Chinese and European communities, culminating in violent riots at Lambing Flat and Buckland. These tensions resulted in the enactment of anti-Chinese legislation by various Australian colonies, foreshadowing the implementation of the discriminatory White Australia policy from 1901 to 1973.

== Earliest Chinese contact with Australia: pre-1848 ==
Some have speculated that northern Aboriginal Australians had dealings with Indonesian traders and so may have had some indirect interaction with Chinese traders in the trepanging market. The first recorded link between China and Australia occurred during the establishment of the Colony of New South Wales. Three ships of the First Fleet, Scarborough, Charlotte and Lady Penrhyn, after depositing their convicts in the colony, sailed for Canton with the intent to purchase tea and other Chinese goods to sell on their return to Britain. The Bigge Report attributed the high level of tea drinking to 'the existence of an intercourse with China from the foundation of the Colony ...' Many East India Company ships used Australia as a port of call on their trips to and from buying tea from China. These ships carried some ethnic Chinese sailors, and some historians have raised the possibility that they chose to disembark in the port of Sydney to start a new life in the colony. In 1818, John Shying who was born in Guangzhou (Canton) in 1798 had arrived and after a period of working as a farmer, in 1829, he became the publican of The Lion in Parramatta. John Macarthur, a prominent pastoralist, employed three Chinese workers on his estates in the 1820s, though his records may well have neglected others.

== Indentured labour: 1848 to 1853 ==
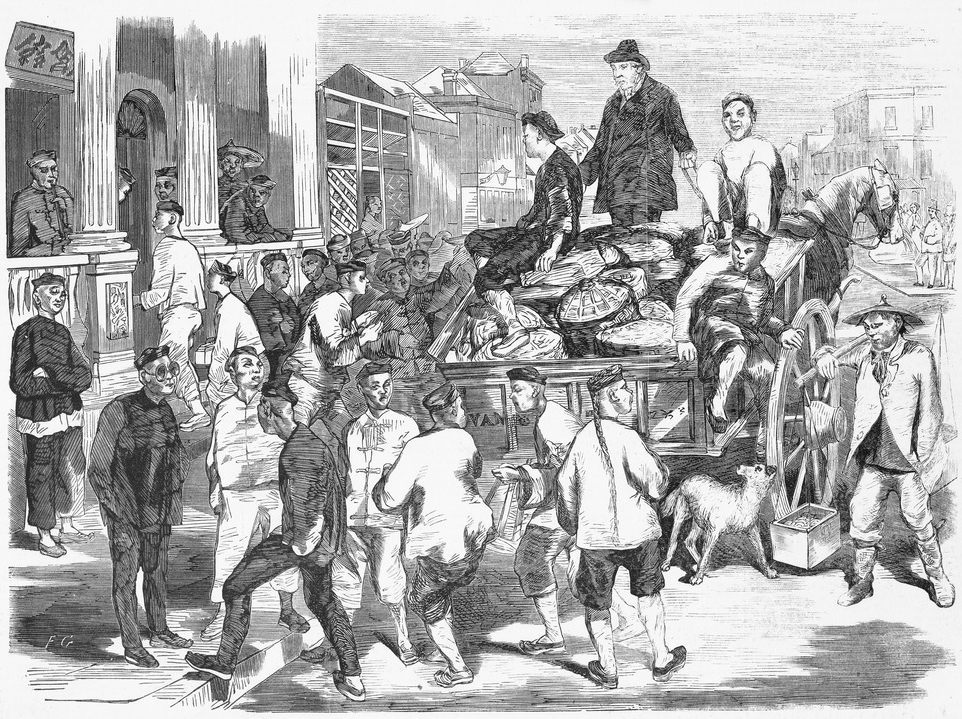
Chinese immigrants arriving in Melbourne's Chinatown, located on Little Bourke Street, 1866

The ethnic Chinese such as Macarthur's employees were part of the varied mix of people that inhabited early Sydney Town. It was the increasing demand for cheap labour after convict transportation ceased in the 1840s that led to much larger numbers of Chinese men arriving as indentured labourers, to work as shepherds for private landowners and the Australian Agricultural Company. These workers mainly came from the province of Fujian via the port of Amoy, with some having been kidnapped and brought to Australia. The practise was often referred to pejoratively as the 'sale of pigs'. In the 1850s, the opening of ports such as Amoy as treaty ports facilitated the practice of importing indentured labour.

Between 1848 and 1853, over 3,000 Chinese workers on labour contracts arrived via the port of Sydney for employment in the New South Wales (then including Victoria and Queensland) countryside. Resistance to this cheap labour occurred as soon as it arrived, and, like such protests later in the century, was heavily spurred on by racist opposition towards the ethnicity of the Chinese emigrants. Little is known of the habits of such men or their relations with other New South Wales residents except for those that appear in the records of the courts and mental asylums. Some stayed for the term of their contracts and then left for home, but there is evidence that others spent the rest of their lives in New South Wales, marrying and founding families that are only now rediscovering their Chinese heritage. A Gulgong resident who died at age 105 in 1911 had been in New South Wales since 1841 while in 1871 the Keeper of Lunacy still required the Amoy dialect from his interpreters. The British were conscious of jeopardising the stipulation that British subjects be allowed to reside in the newly opened treaty ports in China and they made this stipulation reciprocal. So as to avoid antagonising the ruling Qing dynasty, the British government often overruled the Australian colonies when they attempted to exclude Chinese immigration.

== Gold rush: 1850s and 1860s ==
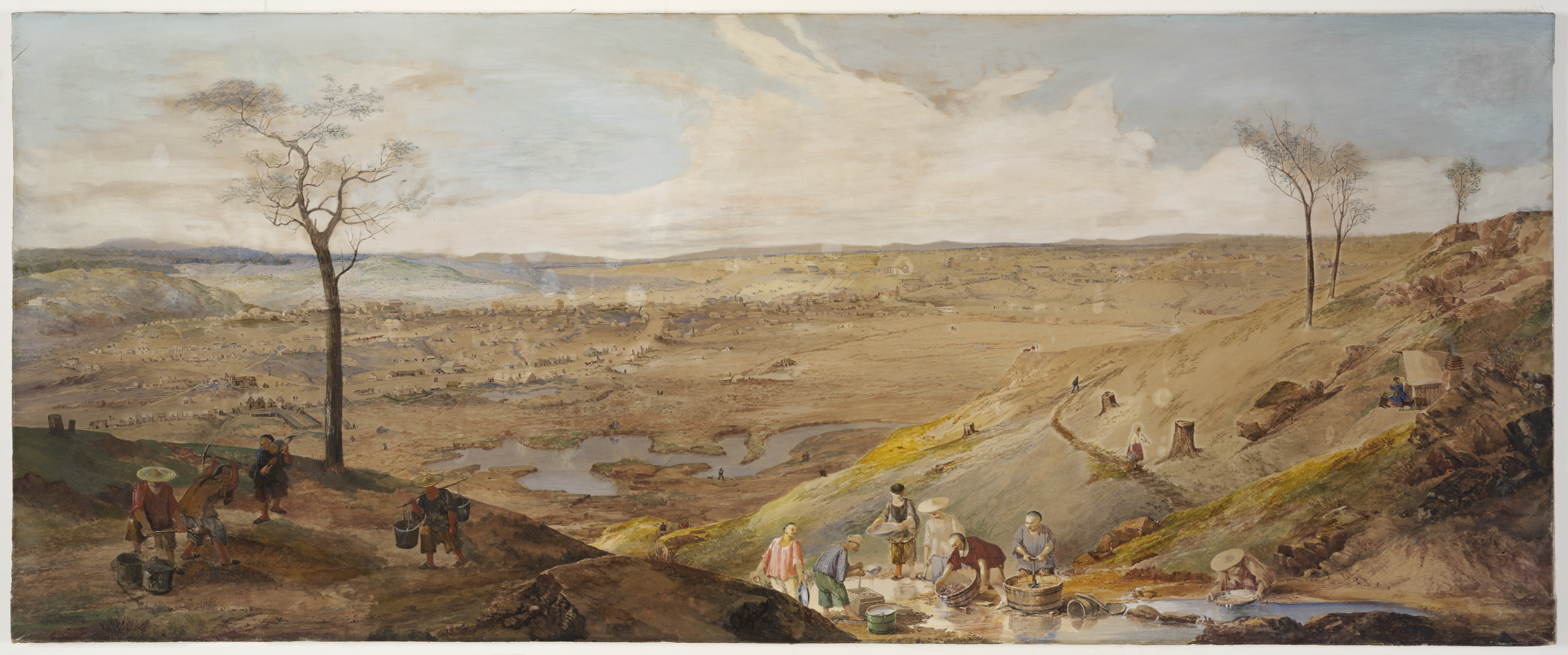
Bird's-eye view of Ballarat with Chinese gold miners in the foreground, 1858, by George Rowe

The 1850s and 1860s saw the largest pre-federation Chinese migration to Australia, with numbers peaking around 40,000, although most returned to China after the gold rush. These numbers were only reached again after the abolition of the White Australia policy in 1973. Gold was found at several places in Australia in 1851 but significant Chinese migration to join the diggers only began late in 1853.

Most Chinese who came to Australia for the gold rush were from Southern China. The Californian Gold Rush had been known as 'old gold mountain' to the Chinese of Guangdong. The Australian rush was known as 'new gold mountain'. Chinese immigrants to Australia left such conditions as overpopulation and poverty. These issues impacted many parts of China, but immigrants to California and the Australian colonies came mainly from the counties most proximate to the port of Hong Kong.

The average voyage from Canton via Hong Kong to Sydney and Melbourne took about 3 months. It was a profitable exercise for the ship masters, and the more Chinese passengers they could fit on board the more money they could make from the passage fares. These fares were often paid through a system of debt to clan leaders and/or to agents who accompanied them on the ship. Such methods of travel were known as credit-tickets. However, some Chinese were able to pay their own way. These were often the wealthier city-born men who were coming to Australia to be merchants or work in an industry other than gold mining. From 1853 to 1855, thousands of Chinese disembarked in Melbourne and headed for the goldfields.

Very few Chinese women came to Australia during this period. In 1861, at least 38,000 Chinese people lived in the Australian colonies with the vast majority being men. On the goldfields in Bendigo in 1861 there were 5,367 Chinese men and only one Chinese woman. By 1861, there were around 40,000 Chinese people living in Australia, constituting 3.3% of the total population.

=== Chinese Restriction Act and The Walk from Robe ===
The arrivals of large numbers of Chinese gold seekers into the only recently created Colony of Victoria caused great alarm among its politicians and gold seekers. In the Victorian parliament, it was argued that it was a security risk to have so many Chinese in the colony who were fighting the Europeans. But the real issue was fear of competition on the goldfields, and in 1855 the Victorian parliament passed the Chinese Restriction Act in an effort to restrict Chinese immigration. These restrictions, including a £10 poll tax on Chinese and a limit to Chinese passengers per tonnage of shipping, caused a reduction in ship owners' profitability, leading to an increase in the already high fares. The Act did limit the numbers of Chinese arriving in Victorian ports, with official Victorian records showing over 10,000 Chinese arrived in Victoria between 1853 and 1855 but only a few hundred in the next two years.

However, the numbers of Chinese on the Victorian goldfields continued to increase heavily. The Chinese were instead travelling to South Australia, and between 1855 and 1857 thousands of Chinese landed in the Port of Adelaide and in Robe, South Australia. The population of the small town of Robe quickly doubled as it developed into a port of call for Chinese continuing onto the Victorian goldfields, while many others disembarked in Sydney and began to enter the NSW goldfields of the central districts. After arrival in South Australia, the large number probably in the thousands of Chinese miners then walked the long overland route to the Victorian goldfields. Parties of Chinese men would often pay for local guides to take them to the goldfields in what was a well organised exercise.

=== Experience on the goldfields ===
After finally arriving on the goldfields the Chinese goldseekers faced many hardships. There was a lot of anti-Chinese sentiment amongst the European miners. In July 1854 in the Bendigo Advertiser it was reported that William Denovan called for an uprising for the purpose of 'the driving of the Chinese population off the Bendigo goldfield'. A riot was averted by the local police commissioner. However, this sort of sentiment was widespread throughout the Australian gold rushes. In 1857 this sentiment caused the Buckland Riot and in 1860-1861 the Lambing Flat riots in NSW. There was also unrest around Ararat when a party of Chinese men were the first to discover gold there and kept the find quiet.

In answer to these problems the parliaments of Victoria and NSW had differing approaches. Victoria installed Chinese protectors modelled on a similar effort in Singapore in 1855. However, the Chinese miners resented the extra £1 per annum residency tax this system required and strong resistance meant it had lapsed by 1861. After this the Victorian system was similar to that in NSW, where Gold Commissioners in charge of the goldfields handled all disputes. In general this meant segregation to minimise the chances of conflict, though again in reality many Chinese people lived where they chose.

Thus, in most of the goldfields of Victoria and NSW Chinese people lived in so called "camps". The camps soon consisted of buildings similar to others but were the forerunners to later Chinatowns in many places. The organization of these camps was often done around clan, or dialect differences where this was applicable. While most of the men were from the Guangdong province, several different dialects and Chinese languages were present on the goldfields.

These camps were their own little communities. To the Europeans these were notorious and exotic places. At the same time in China, opium addiction was rampant, some of the men brought this addiction with them to the goldfields. Two of the most common finds by modern fossickers in the area of Chinese camps are Chinese coins and opium pipes. However, the records of local health groups and hospitals show only low numbers of Chinese were ever treated for their opium addictions.

After the Gold rushes in Victoria, some Chinese moved into the other colonies to follow gold rushes there. New South Wales and Queensland hadn't followed Victoria in establishing Chinese related legislation. This could be seen as a cause for the Lambing Flats Riots and then later the same problems were found on the Palmer River Goldfields in the late 1870s where Chinese miners vastly outnumbered Europeans.

=== Chinese burials on the goldfields ===
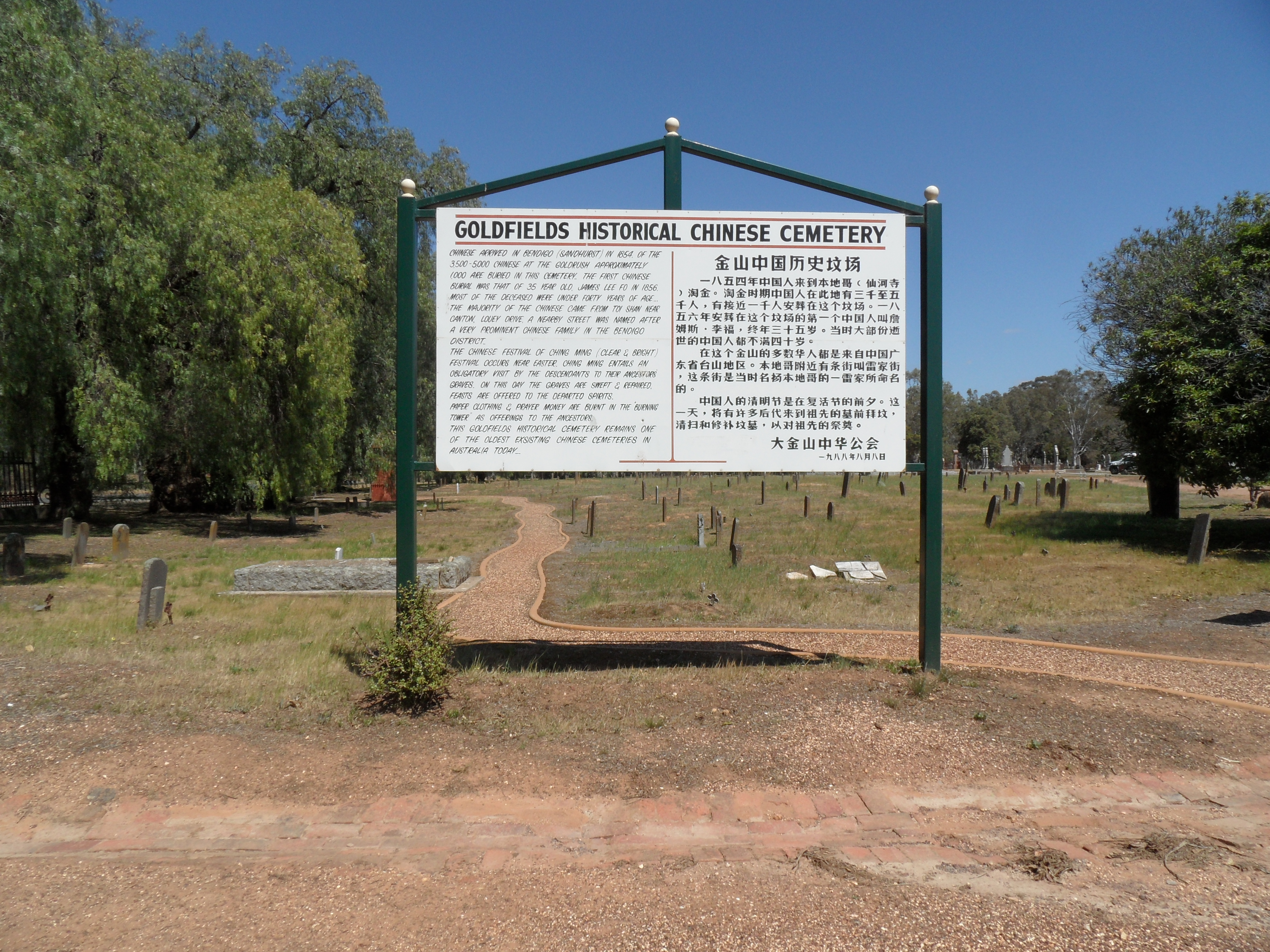
White Hills Cemetery Chinese Section

As soon as the Chinese started arriving in Australia, they started dying here. Many wanted their remains to be sent back to China for spiritual and traditional reasons. Many families went to great lengths to see this achieved. Others however, were buried in Australia. Cemeteries around the country contain Chinese graves. To accommodate the Chinese funeral rituals that involve burning of effigies, cemeteries around Australia allowed the construction of chimneys. These chimneys can still be found in cemeteries around the country today. Often the people in charge of the cemeteries were devout Christians, people who had an aversion to what they saw as pagan rituals.

The Chinese section of the White Hills cemetery in Bendigo is possibly the most important example remaining in Australia of Chinese graves in their original state. Beechworth Cemetery, which opened in 1857, is significant for the way in which it incorporates a Chinese section into the original cemetery plan. Many other cemeteries have been redeveloped and the heritage and cultural diversity of their Chinese sections has been lost.

== From miners to artisans: 1877 to 1901 ==
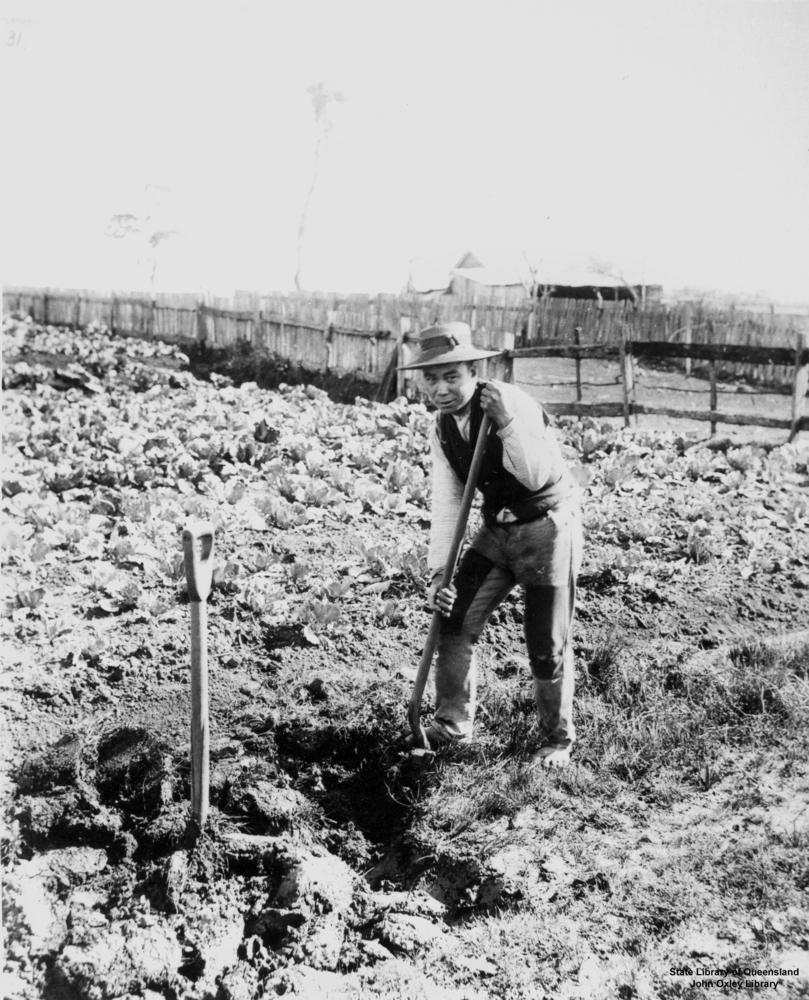
Chinese market gardener, ca. 1893

After the Victorian and NSW gold rushes of the 1850s and 1860s, the numbers of Chinese in those colonies declined significantly. In 1873 in the far north of Queensland at the Palmer River, after the discovery of gold there was another rush and by 1877 there were 20,000 Chinese there. The conditions and problems there were both similar to those in Victoria but also conditions were more extreme. After the ending of this Queensland rush, people either returned to China or dispersed. Many Chinese stayed in Queensland and worked hard to establish much of the northern banana trade.

In the 1880s there was also a rise in anti-Chinese sentiment in the cities of Melbourne and Sydney. Earlier discontent had been curtailed by the segregationist policies in the rural protectorates and poorly reported in the urban publications. However, as more and more Chinese began moving from the country towns into the cities there was an equal rise in anti-Chinese sentiment. This resulted in another round of restrictive Acts in NSW in 1881 and 1888. It also contributed to a rising drive for the Federation of Australia. One of the most compelling arguments for federation amongst the public and politicians of the time was that a united immigration policy would secure the borders of all the Australian colonies. The Chinese 'pest' or 'menace' was the root of these immigration fears.

Mining remained one of the biggest industries for Chinese in Australia but it was becoming more of a risky endeavor as the alluvial fields petered out. Chinese in the country towns either established themselves in other industries there or moved to the cities. Many of those opened stores and became merchants and hawkers. In 1890, in NSW alone there were nearly 800 shops owned and run by the Chinese. Fishing and fish curing industries were operating in Melbourne and north and south of Sydney in the 1850s, 1860s and 1870s. This provided Chinese people throughout New South Wales and Victoria with valuable seafood. By the 1890s Chinese people in Australia were represented in a wide variety of occupations including scrub cutters, interpreters, cooks, tobacco farmers, launderers, market gardeners, cabinet-makers, storekeepers and drapers, though by this time the Chinese operated fishing industry seems to have disappeared. In this period Sydney and Melbourne's proportion of the Chinese residents of Australia had steadily increased. One prominent Chinese Australian at this time was gold seeker Wong Ah Sat and Mei Quong Tart who ran a popular tea house in the Queen Victoria Building in Sydney. In Melbourne Lowe Kong Meng and Louis Ah Mouy were two prominent merchants.

During this period, furniture making became one of the largest industries for Chinese. At the height of this industry in Melbourne there were 175 firms, producing and selling Chinese made furniture. However, the Chinese success in this industry didn't last. Furniture makers of European descent petitioned the government, saying Chinese furniture makers were hurting their livelihoods. The government of Victoria but not New South Wales passed a Factories and Shops Act that targeted Chinese working in that industry.

== Implementation of the White Australia Policy: 1901 to 1911 ==
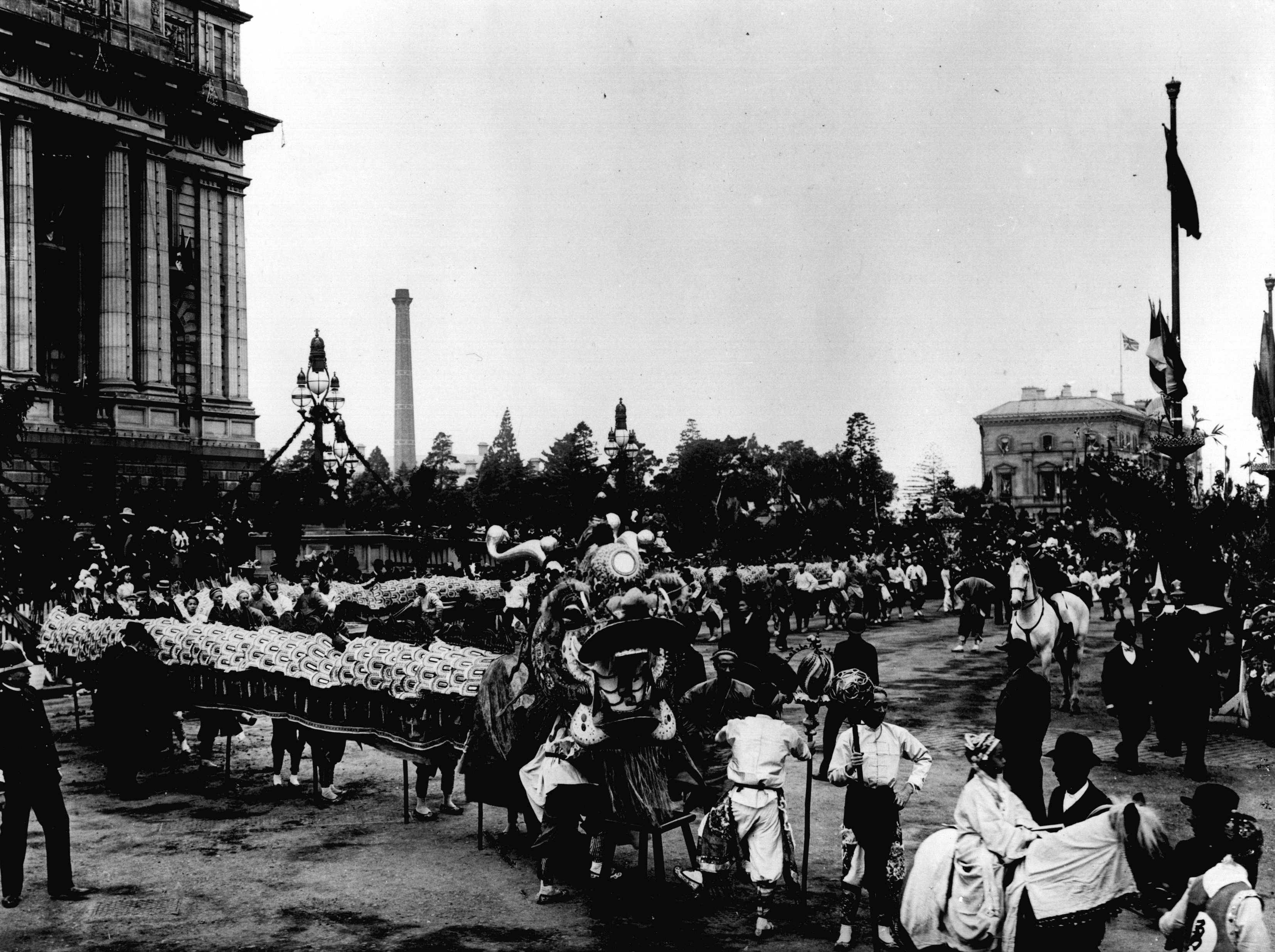
Chinese Australians took part in parades to celebrate Federation in Melbourne 1901

By the time of Australian Federation, there were around 29,000 ethnic Chinese in Australia: Chinese people in the capital cities of Sydney and Melbourne, were a significant group, running numerous stores, an import trade, societies and several Chinese language newspapers. There were also many Chinese still working in the north of Queensland in the banana trade. Tin mining in Tasmania was also a venture that brought Chinese workers to the state. They were also part of an international community involved in political events in China such as sending delegates to a Peking Parliament or making donations at times of natural disaster. There were many Chinese Australians who supported the Xinhai Revolution and Sun Yat-sen. The passing of the Immigration Restriction Act 1901, however, froze the Chinese communities of the late 19th century into a slow decline. Thanks to Australian Chinese newspapers like the Tung Wah Times and the Chinese Times which were distributed to Chinese communities all over Australia and thanks to the many clan societies, Chinese Australians were a rather united group, in spite of the geographical distances. This can be seen by the colourful debates that went on within the community over the future of China. Some in Australia and notably the Tung Wah Times believed China should keep a monarchy and they supported reform. Others believed China needed a republic and they supported Sun Yat-sen. The first Chinese-language novel to be published in Australia (and possibly anywhere in the West), The Poison of Polygamy, appeared in Melbourne's Chinese Times in 1909-10 and while it makes only a passing mention of the White Australia Policy, has much to say on the political situation in China, and other cultural and political topics relating to the modernisation of China. At the same time, Chinese republican revolutionaries were operating in Australia, and the Qing government saw a need to dissuade the Chinese diaspora against supporting the republicans. Reflecting the political debate in China, Chinese Australians had by 1900 formed branches of the Chinese Empire Reform Association to press for reform in China.

Chinese regalia travelled around the country to be used by communities for Chinese new year and local events. In May 1901, to celebrate the sitting of the first federal parliament, Chinese people paraded two dragons through the streets.

Continued discrimination, both legal and social, reduced the occupational range of Chinese people until market gardening, always a major occupation, became far and away the representative role of 'John Chinaman'. It was as gardeners that most pre-1901 now granted status as 'domiciles' under the 1901 Act, visited their villages and established families throughout the first 30 years or so of the 20th century, relying on the minority of merchants to assist them to negotiate with the Immigration Restriction Act bureaucracy. Only the rise of a new generation of Australian-born Chinese people, combined with new migrants that the merchants and others sponsored, both legally and illegally, prevented the Chinese populations in Australia from disappearing entirely.

== War, refugees and the Republic era: 1912 to 1949 ==
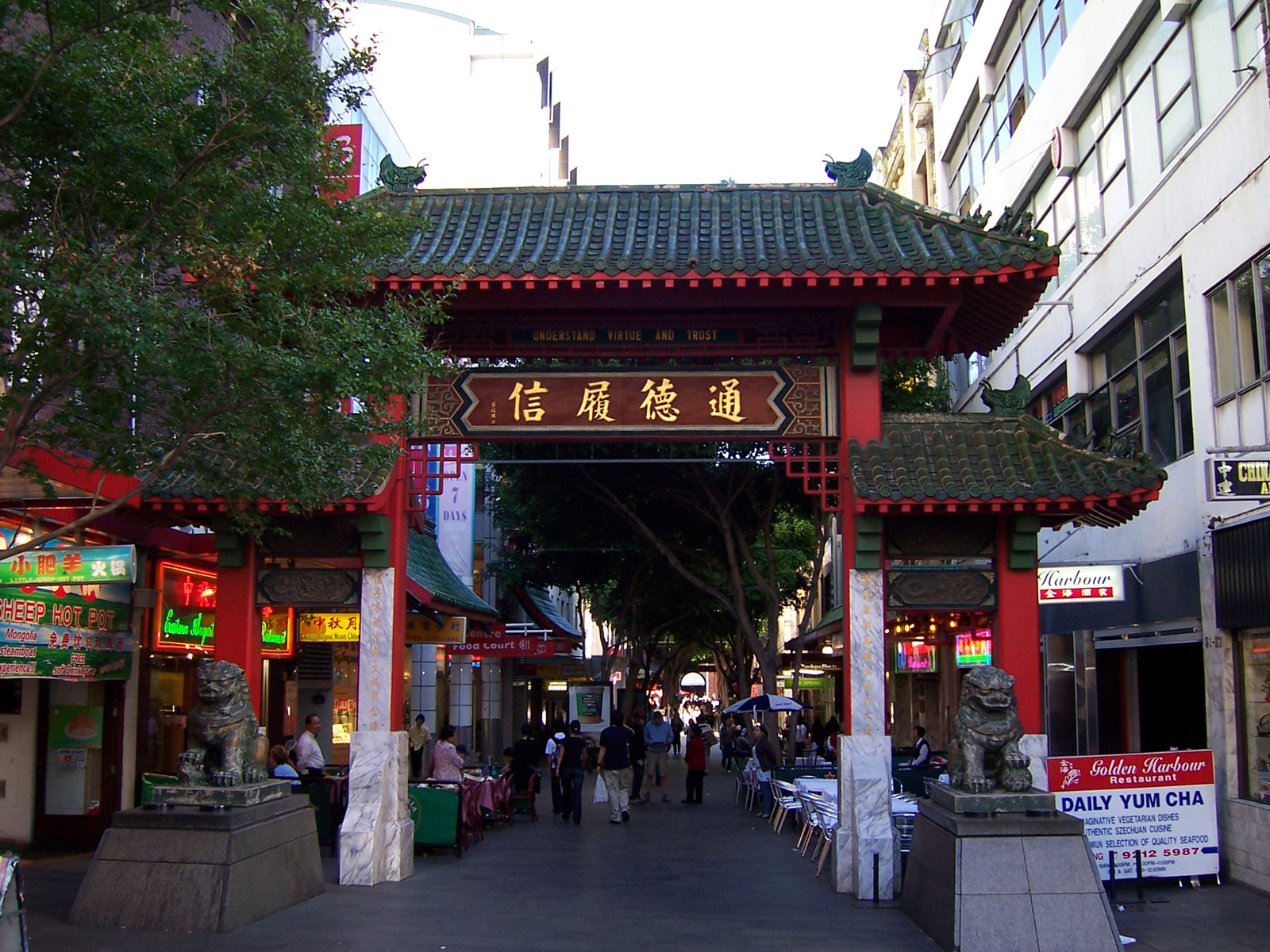
Sydney's Chinatown

In WW2 the Darwin branch of the KMT was a valuable source of information for Chinese Australians. Chinese Australians also showed the support for the republic with monetary donations. In 1913 Chinese Australians, Chinese New Zealanders and others in the Chinese diaspora in the Pacific donated £36,000 to China. A letter of thank you to the Chinese Australians from the Finance Minister of the Republic is on display at the Golden Dragon Museum.

World War I presented Chinese Australians with many unique challenges. It is by the outbreak of the war in 1914 it is estimated that there were less than 1000 Chinese Australian men of fighting age. Of these only about 198 men of Chinese ancestry managed to enlist in the AIF. One of these was the famous and decorated sniper Billy Sing. These men managed to enlist in spite of the policy that only those with significant European heritage were allowed to serve.

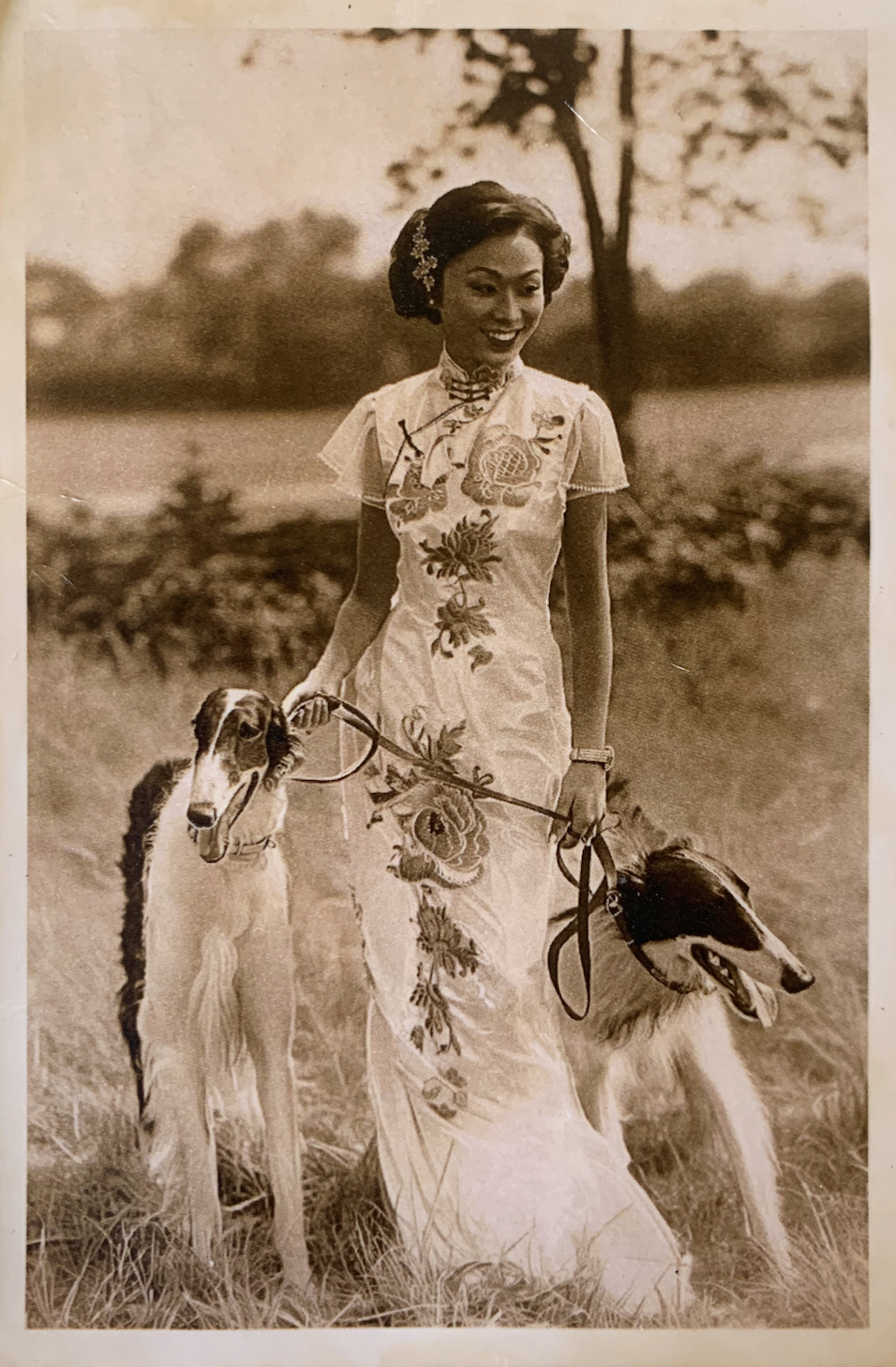
A Chinese Australian woman wearing traditional qipao standing in the bushland with two borzoi dogs in the bushland of Bendigo, Victoria, Australia, 1930s

During the inter-war period, Australian-born people of Chinese background began to predominate over Chinese-born people for the first time. Numbers increased rapidly again when refugees consisting of ethnic Chinese toddlers began to enter Australia as the result of WW2. Some were Chinese crew members who refused to return to Japanese-held areas and others were ethnic Chinese residents of the many Pacific islands evacuated in the face of the Japanese advance. Still, others included those with Australian birth who were able to leave Hong Kong and the villages on the approach of the Japanese. At the same time, the anti-Japanese War helped inspire the development of organizations focused on China rather than the districts and villages of people's origin only and aimed at making Australia aware of the danger of Japan and the need to assist China. A few of these organizations, such as the Chinese Youth League, survive to this day.

The Chifley government's Darwin Lands Acquisition Act 1945 compulsorily acquired 53 acres (21 ha) of land owned by Chinese-Australians in Darwin, leading to the end of the local Chinatown. The Northern Territory's administrator Aubrey Abbott had written to Joseph Carrodus, secretary of the Department of the Interior, in 1943 to propose "the elimination of undesirable elements which Darwin has suffered from far too much in the past" and stated that compulsory acquisition and conversion to leasehold should "entirely prevent the Chinese quarter forming again". He further observed that "if land is acquired from the former Chinese residents there is really no need for them to return as they have no other assets". The territory's civilian population had mostly been evacuated during the war and the former Chinatown residents returned to find their homes and businesses reduced to rubble.

== Cafes to Citizens: 1949 to 1973 ==
Number of permanent settlers arriving in Australia from mainland China since 1991 (monthly)

In the post-war period, assimilation became the dominant policy and this led to some extension of rights with gradual changes to citizenship laws. At the same time cafes began to replace market gardens as the major source of employment and avenue for bringing in new migrants, both legal and illegal. These changes, combined with the increased number of Australian-born Chinese, the final return of the last of the domiciles who still wished to do so and the arrival of Chinese background students under the Colombo Plan from various parts of Asia, brought about the end of the dominance of south China in the link between China and Australia that had existed for nearly 100 years.

== Re-migration and multiculturalism: 1973 to present ==
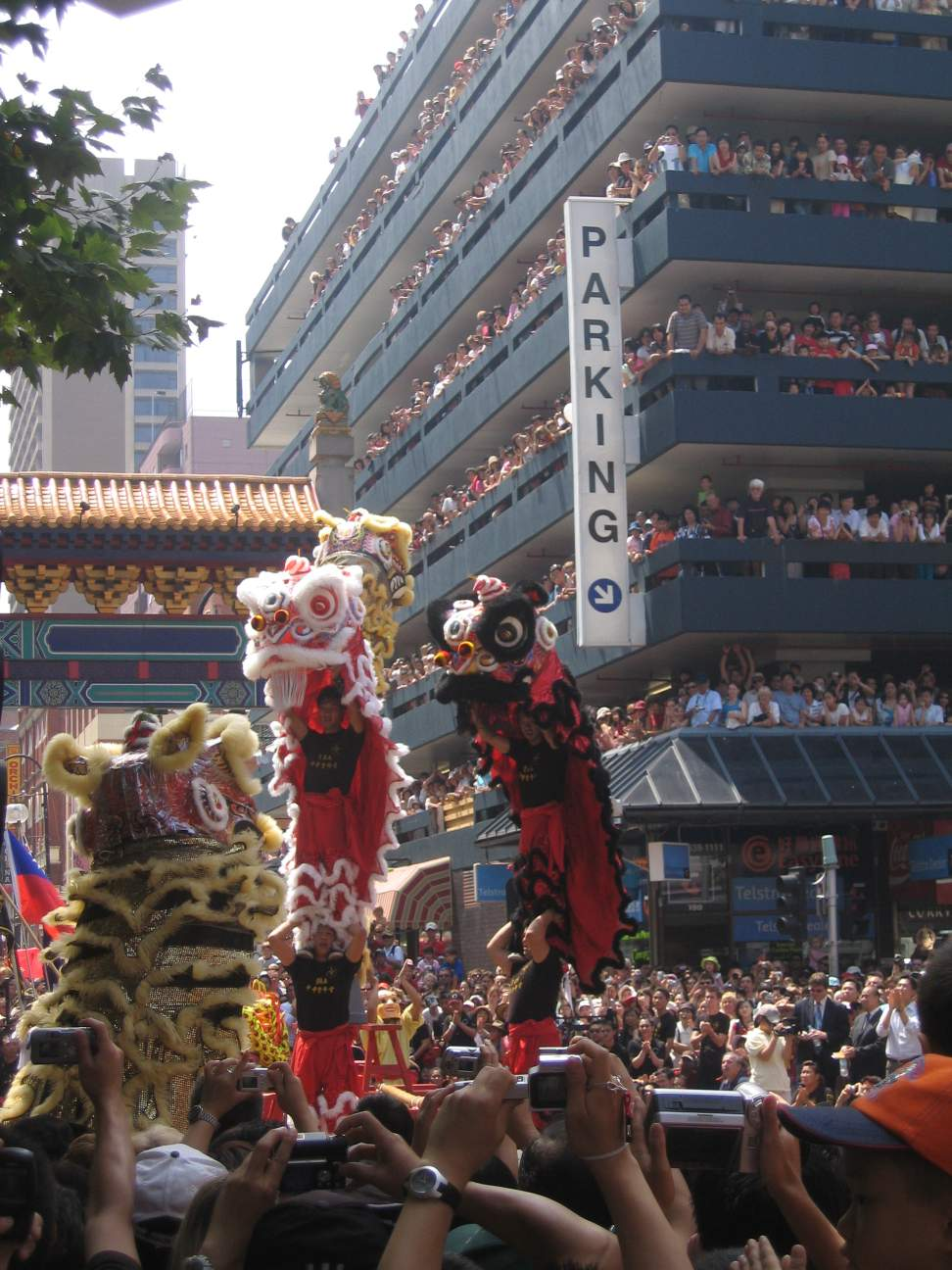
Chinese New Year Melbourne's Chinatown

The final end of the White Australia Policy saw new arrivals from the Chinese diaspora and for the first time significant numbers from non-Cantonese speaking parts of China. The first wave of arrivals were ethnic Chinese refugees from Vietnam and Cambodia during the 1970s; this was followed by economic migrants from Hong Kong in the 1980s and 1990s, whose families often settled in Sydney while the breadwinner returned to Hong Kong to continue earning an income – a significant reversal of the traditional migration pattern.

After the Tiananmen Square massacre of 1989, the then Australian Prime Minister, Bob Hawke, allowed students from mainland China then resident to settle in Australia permanently. Since then, immigrants from mainland China and Taiwan have arrived in increasing numbers. New institutions were established for these arrivals and old ones such as the Chinese Chamber of Commerce revived; Chinese language newspapers were once again published. The equality of citizenship laws and family reunion immigration after 1972 meant that an imbalance of the sexes, once a dominant feature of the Chinese communities in Australia, was not an issue in these later migrations.

Chinese newspapers are published in Australia and three shortwave and longwave radio channels broadcast in Mandarin and Cantonese. The Australian public broadcaster SBS also provides television and radio on weekends. Chinese Australian social websites like Xīn Zújì (新足迹, www.oursteps.com.au) and FREEOZ (www.freeoz.org) also blossomed. Several Chinese Australians have received the Order of Australia award and there are current representatives in both State and Federal parliaments. Chinese immigration has increased continuously from the 1990s and today the Chinese are the third largest group among immigrants. Since the mid-1990s, migration has become less permanent than it used to be, and goes in more than direction, a trend that pertains also to the Chinese. Students and academics are examples of this pattern. In 1990, Chinese settlers rarely returned permanently, but by 2002, the number of Hong Kong settlers leaving Australia for good equalled those arriving during that year.

In 2005-6 China (not including Hong Kong or Macau) was the third major source of permanent migrants to Australia behind the United Kingdom and New Zealand but with more migrants than from India. Between 2000–01 and 2005–06, the number of skilled migrants coming to Australia from China more than tripled, from 3,800 to 12,500 people.

== See also ==
- Golden Dragon Museum (Chinese: 金龙博物馆) in Bendigo
- Sze Yup Temple, heritage-listed temple in Sydney
- Yiu Ming Temple, heritage-listed temple in Sydney
- Holy Triad Temple, Albion, City of Brisbane, Queensland
- Hou Wang Temple, Atherton, Queensland
- Chinatowns in Australia
- Chinese Australians
- Chinese emigration
- Overseas Chinese
- Australia-China Relations
- Jook-sing – Term for person of Chinese descent who adopts Western cultural norms
- Museum of Chinese in Australia – History museum in Sydney, New South Wales
- Chinese Museum, Melbourne
