= Yiu Ming Temple =

Chinese temple in City of Sydney, New South Wales, Australia

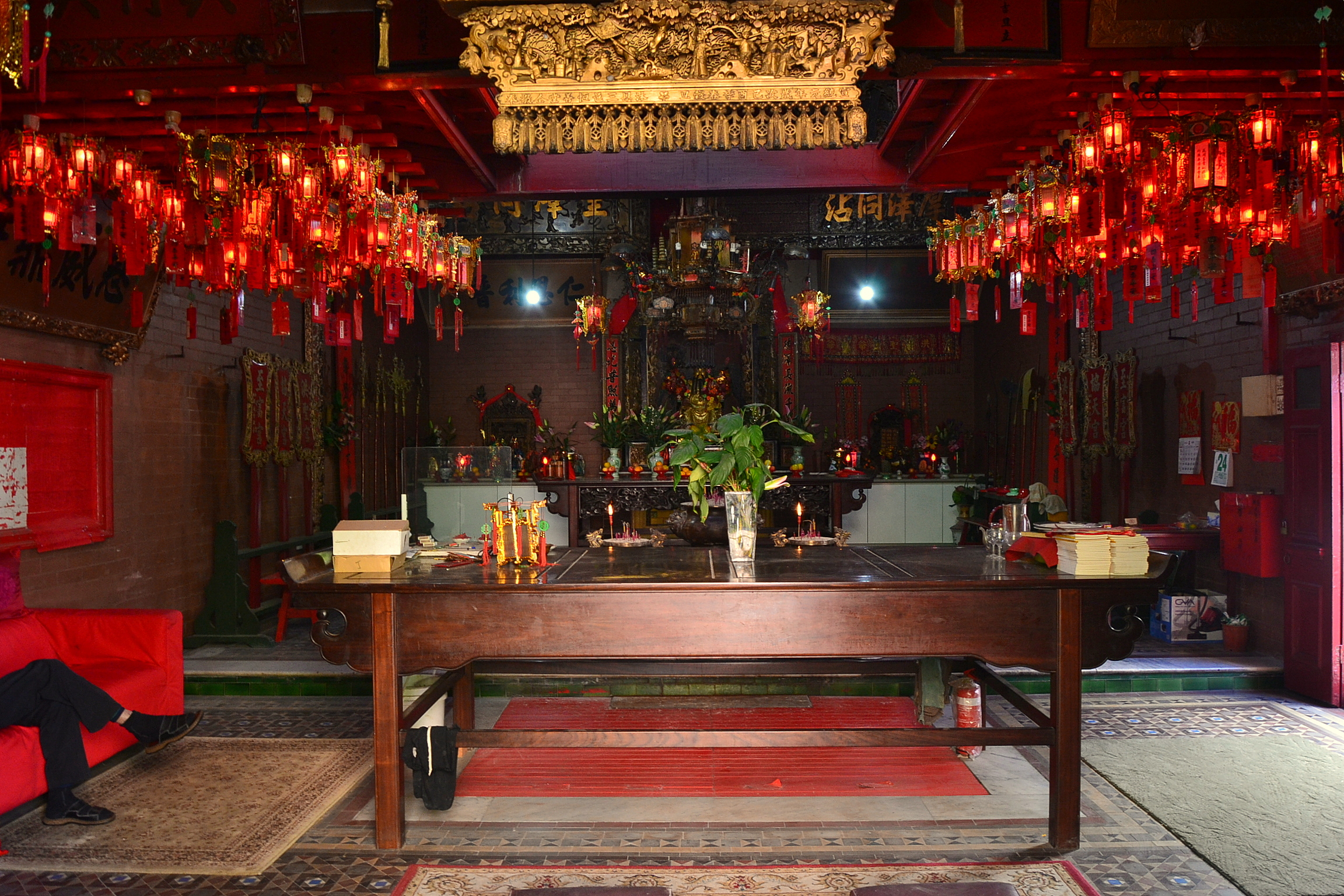
- Inside the Yiu Ming Temple

- Location within Sydney Location within Australia
- 33.9025°S 151.2007°E
- Location: 16–22 Retreat Street, Alexandria, City of Sydney, New South Wales, Australia

Site notes
- Owner: Yiu Ming Society

New South Wales Heritage Register
- Official name: Yiu Ming Temple; Yiu Ming Hung Fook Tong Temple; Chinese Temple; Hong Sheng Gong; Hung Sheng Gong
- Type: state heritage (built)
- Designated: 24 September 1999
- Reference no.: 1297
- Type: Shrine
- Category: Religion

Yiu Ming Temple (Chinese: 要明廟) is a heritage-listed Chinese temple at 16–22 Retreat Street, Alexandria, New South Wales, an inner suburb of Sydney, Australia. Built in 1908–1909, Yiu Ming Temple is one of the oldest surviving Chinese temples in Australia and a globally rare intact example of the traditional Chinese village temple form. While commonly known as the "Yiu Ming Temple" (after the names of two towns in Guangdong province in China, where the community that founded the temple came from), its formal name is Hong Sheng Gong or Hung Sheng Gong (Chinese: 洪聖宮), which indicates that it is a Hung Shing Temple. It is also sometimes known as Yiu Ming Hung Fook Tong Temple (Chinese: 要明洪福堂), which is strictly the name of the previous temple used by the same community. It was added to the New South Wales State Heritage Register on 24 September 1999.

== History ==
The earliest temple records of the Yiu-Ming Hung Fook Tong stem from the 1870s. Members then, as now, come from two districts, Gaoyao District and Gaoming District, in Guangdong Province in China. A temple named Hung Fook Tong serving the community originating from Gaoyao and Gaoming (hence Yiu-Ming, from the second syllables of the two place names) was first built in Arncliffe in 1870. However, the temple was small and could not accommodate all attendees, so the Gaoyao-Gaoming community began raising funds in 1904 to purchase a larger plot of land for the temple. In 1908, land was purchased in Alexandria to build a community hall and a new temple to be called the Hung Sheng Gong, with some houses adjacent to the temple retained to be leased at low rents to new arrivals from Gaoyao-Gaoming or elderly community members who were unable to return to China. The Hung Sheng Gong is so-named because the principal deity worshiped is the sea god Hung Shing.

The 1880s-era rate books of the Municipality of Alexandria list many Chinese community members. By 1890, it was estimated that about 100 Chinese community members lived in Retreat Street.

Construction of the temple took place c. 1908–1909, with further work to the interior in 1917. The temple's figurative ceramic roof titles were imported from Foshan ceramic works. Two private companies, Tiy Loy and Co. and Wah Hing and Co. were established by society members, with premises on Botany Road, adjacent to Retreat Street. Society records from 1910 also list members in Rose Bay, Botany, northern Sydney, Canberra, Bombala and Newcastle. During the 20th century, attendees at the temple extended beyond the Gaoyao-Gaoming community to include Chinese migrants from other counties in Guangdong province.

In the 1980s, society membership increased dramatically as a result of increased Chinese immigration. In May 1981, the pailou and tile-capped wall were added to the temple, enclosing Retreat Street. In 1990, the Committee for the Yiu Ming Society was formed, with the first committee members elected, replacing an earlier system where officials were appointed. The name of the Society was changed and shortened from Yiu Ming Hung Fook Tong Society to Yiu Ming Society.

In 1995–96, conservation documentation of both the temple and Retreat Street was completed. A fire broke out in the temple in December 1996, but was quickly extinguished. In 1997–98, the building and associated objects were restored and cleaned in conjunction with community artisans and architects as well as Powerhouse Museum staff, informed by the earlier conservation documentation. The temple roof was replicated using imported Chinese tiles. Damaged timber panels from the temple interior were restored. Undamaged wooden items were cleaned. The main light fitting of the temple was reconstructed around the original frame. The altar table, which was completely destroyed, was replaced. The altar itself was cleaned and the central painting was re-painted. The temple was re-wired and repainted. The garden was tiled. The main burner of the temple was moved outside to minimise smoke damage and the sunken floor area which housed it has been filled in by the addition of removable timber panels. The temple reopened around Chinese New Year in 1998–99. Around that time, the associated terrace houses were refurbished, improving living conditions for the elderly residents.

== Description ==
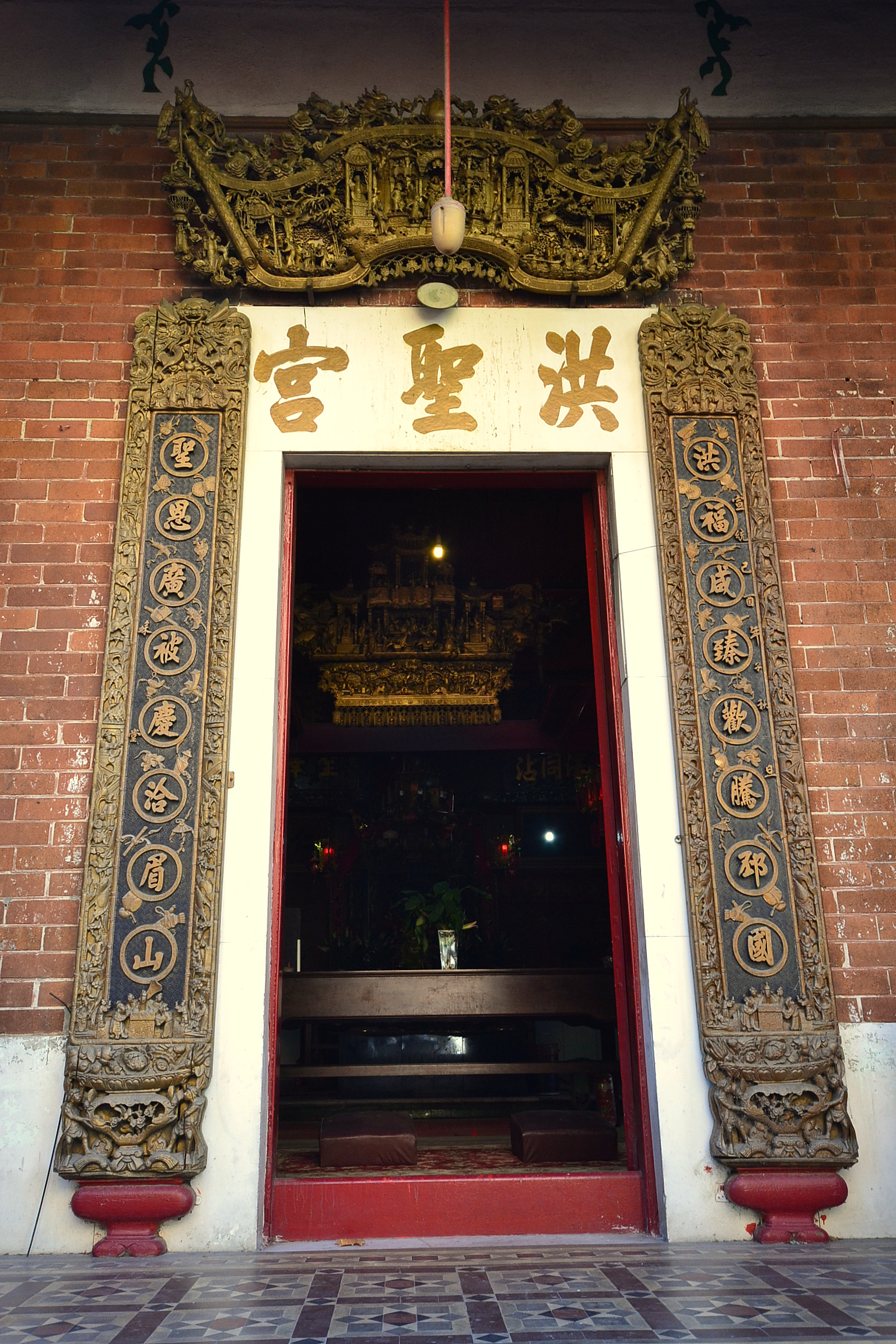
Elaborately decorated door to the main hall.

The temple remains much as it was when originally built. Most of the internal fittings date from this time. The temple walls are of red-faced brick, originally tuck pointed. The internal floor is of tessellated tiles with a white marble edging. Many internal details are of timber. The area is lit and ventilated by a "roof lantern" over a sunken floor section designed for burning incense and oil. Doors and fittings, including the main altar, are original.

The physical fabric of the temple and its associated objects retain evidence of the historical, architectural, social and spiritual significance of this site.

== Heritage listing ==
The temple is of historical, architectural, religious and social significance to a section of Sydney's Chinese community. The Yiu Ming is one of the oldest and largest Chinese Societies. For approximately 130 years, the temple and its community and environment have provided practical assistance and spiritual support for community members seeking to establish themselves in Australia. Architecturally, the building is significant for its blending of traditional design, local materials and Federation detailing. The building has not been significantly modified since construction. The most significant modifications, following recent fire damage, replicated original form and materials as much as possible. The elaborate fittings of the temple provide evidence of community commitment to the temple and also demonstrate the skill of Chinese artisans at the beginning of the 20th century. As many village temples in China no longer exist, this fine, intact example is considered to be of both local and international significance.

Yiu Ming Temple was listed on the New South Wales State Heritage Register on 24 September 1999 having satisfied the following criteria.

The place is important in demonstrating the course, or pattern, of cultural or natural history in New South Wales.

The site has a recorded history of continuous Chinese occupation since the 1870s. The temple and many fittings and associated objects have remained substantially intact. The site and the temple are associated with many significant Chinese community members. These include Sam Warley, who operated a large import business with branches in Perth and Hong Kong, John Hoe, who operated a large timber business and formed the NSW Chinese Chamber of Commerce and Deen Bong, a successful cabinet maker who was an early manager of Tiy Loy and Co. Many society members have been influential in the introduction, growing, marketing and distribution of Chinese vegetables and food. Society members have also helped to maintain Chinese festivals and celebrations, including the lion dance.

The place is important in demonstrating aesthetic characteristics and/or a high degree of creative or technical achievement in New South Wales.

It represents a unique blend of Chinese temple design and Federation detailing. It seems likely that Federation detailing drew heavily on the decorative elements of the Chinese building tradition. The building is an example of the aesthetic of village temples. Standardised building codes and systems meant that temples build outside China strongly resemble those built within China. Exposed rafters and purlins demonstrate traditional Chinese roof structure and demonstrate the flexibility of this system. The highly coloured decorative paintwork used throughout is a very strong aesthetic statement the figurative ceramic roof ridge tiles are a very strong element of the external architecture of the temple. The interior fittings and objects, commissioned from China, represent excellent examples of Chinese decorative arts at the time the temple was built. Many similar pieces have been destroyed in China so that the aesthetic significance of this material is very high.

The place has a strong or special association with a particular community or cultural group in New South Wales for social, cultural or spiritual reasons.

The complex has remained a cultural, religious and social centre for the community. The temple society has assisted community members, especially those newly arrived in Australia, by providing low cost housing, financial support and employment opportunities. This support was especially important when government policy meant that many community members were forced to live with only irregular contact with partners and families, who were still in China. Before the practice was banned, following the Chinese Communist Revolution, Society members also arranged to return the bones of dead members to China for burial. Painted panels inside the temple list donors at the time of construction of the temple. These panels often refer to loyalty, brotherhood and the wish for happiness, prosperity and longevity. Many current Society members are able to identify the names of grandfathers, great uncles and other forebears on these panels and in the written records of the Society. The temple strongly communicates a sense of community identity and continuity. The Yiu Ming temple siting, orientation and layout follow principles of Chinese cosmology commonly known as feng shui. The main deity of the temple is Hong Sheng. "god of the southern seas". Hong Sheng is not a common deity either for Chinese Australians or for people from southern China. Cai Shen and Guan Di are other gods represented in the temple. The temple iconography includes much Daoist symbolism, including representations of the 8 Immortals and 8 precious things. There is also reference to Buddha.

The place has potential to yield information that will contribute to an understanding of the cultural or natural history of New South Wales.

The temple illustrates various technical adaptations to local conditions and materials. It also demonstrates the internationally recognised versatility and innovative skills of Chinese carpenters during the late 19th and early 20th centuries. Given the scarcity of examples of this scale of "village" temple, even in China, the general adherence to traditional design principles is also of technical interest.

Inscriptions on the painted panels inside the temple provide much information about society members enabling further research into the history of the Society and its members. The records and documents of the Society appear to have been maintained. The Society's relationship to business, market gardening and the Chinese cemetery area at Rookwood are all significant areas for further research.

The place possesses uncommon, rare or endangered aspects of the cultural or natural history of New South Wales.

This temple is one of only a small number (9) of Chinese temples that survive in Australia. It also illustrates traditional Chinese architecture in transition, displaying various adaptations to local conditions and materials. The temple houses a range of movable objects that were specially commissioned by the community from artists and craftsmen in Guandong at the time that the temple was constructed. In mainland China, many village temples of this period have either been destroyed or are used for other purposes.

The place is important in demonstrating the principal characteristics of a class of cultural or natural places/environments in New South Wales.

The building is an example of Chinese village temple design with distinctive local elements. Retreat Street represents a community approach to survival and adaptation to life in a new country.

== See also ==
- Hung Shing Temple, list of temples dedicated to Hong Sheng Da Wang (洪聖大王) in Hong Kong and other parts of the world
- Sze Yup Temple, another historic Chinese temple in Sydney
- Holy Triad Temple, Albion, City of Brisbane, Queensland
- Hou Wang Temple, Atherton, Queensland
