= Sze Yup Temple =

Taoist temple in Glebe, Sydney, Australia

Sze Yup Temple 悉尼四邑關帝廟
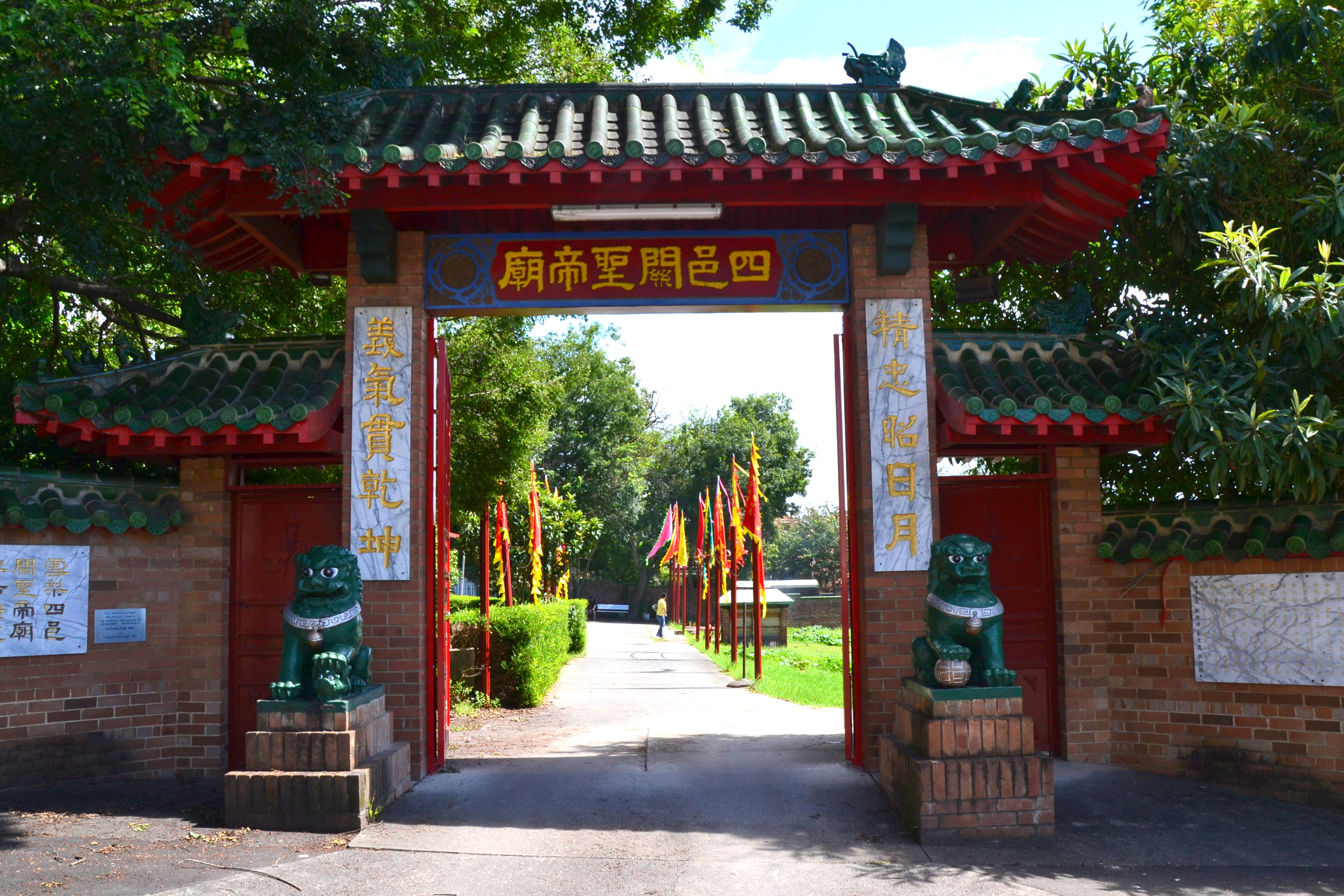
- Sze Yup Temple entrance

- Location within Sydney

Religion
- Affiliation: Taoism
- Deity: Kwan Ti
- Ownership: Trustees of the Sze Yup Temple

Location
- Location: Victoria Road, Glebe, City of Sydney, New South Wales, Australia
- Country: Australia
- Coordinates: 33.8741°S 151.1806°E

Architecture
- Type: Temple
- Style: Chinese
- Completed: 1898–1904

New South Wales Heritage Register
- Official name: Sze Yup Temple & Joss House; Sze Yup Kwan Ti Temple; Joss House; Chinese Temple
- Type: State heritage (complex / group)
- Designated: 2 April 1999
- Reference no.: 267
- Type: Buddhist Temple
- Category: Religion

The Sze Yup Temple (Chinese: 悉尼四邑關帝廟) is a heritage-listed Chinese joss house and Taoist temple located at Victoria Road in the inner western Sydney suburb of Glebe in the City of Sydney local government area of New South Wales, Australia. It was built from 1898 to 1904. Properly the Sze Yup Kwan Ti Temple ("the temple of Kwan Ti of the people of the Four Counties"), it is also sometimes called the Sze Yup Temple & Joss House or Joss House and Chinese Temple. The property is owned by Trustees of the Sze Yup Temple. It was added to the New South Wales State Heritage Register on 2 April 1999. It is one of only four pre-World War I Chinese temples that remain active in Australia.

The temple venerates Kwan Ti (Guan Di), a popular deity based on Guan Yu, a military figure of the Three Kingdoms Period. Its form, and those of the grounds, reflect the architectural style of Sze Yup counties (Siyi) in Guangdong, China. The central hall (1898) holds the Kwan Ti shrine, with the later eastern and western halls (1903) serving as an ancestral hall and hall dedicated to Caishen (Choi Buk Sing, 財神), the god of wealth.

== History ==
=== History of the area ===
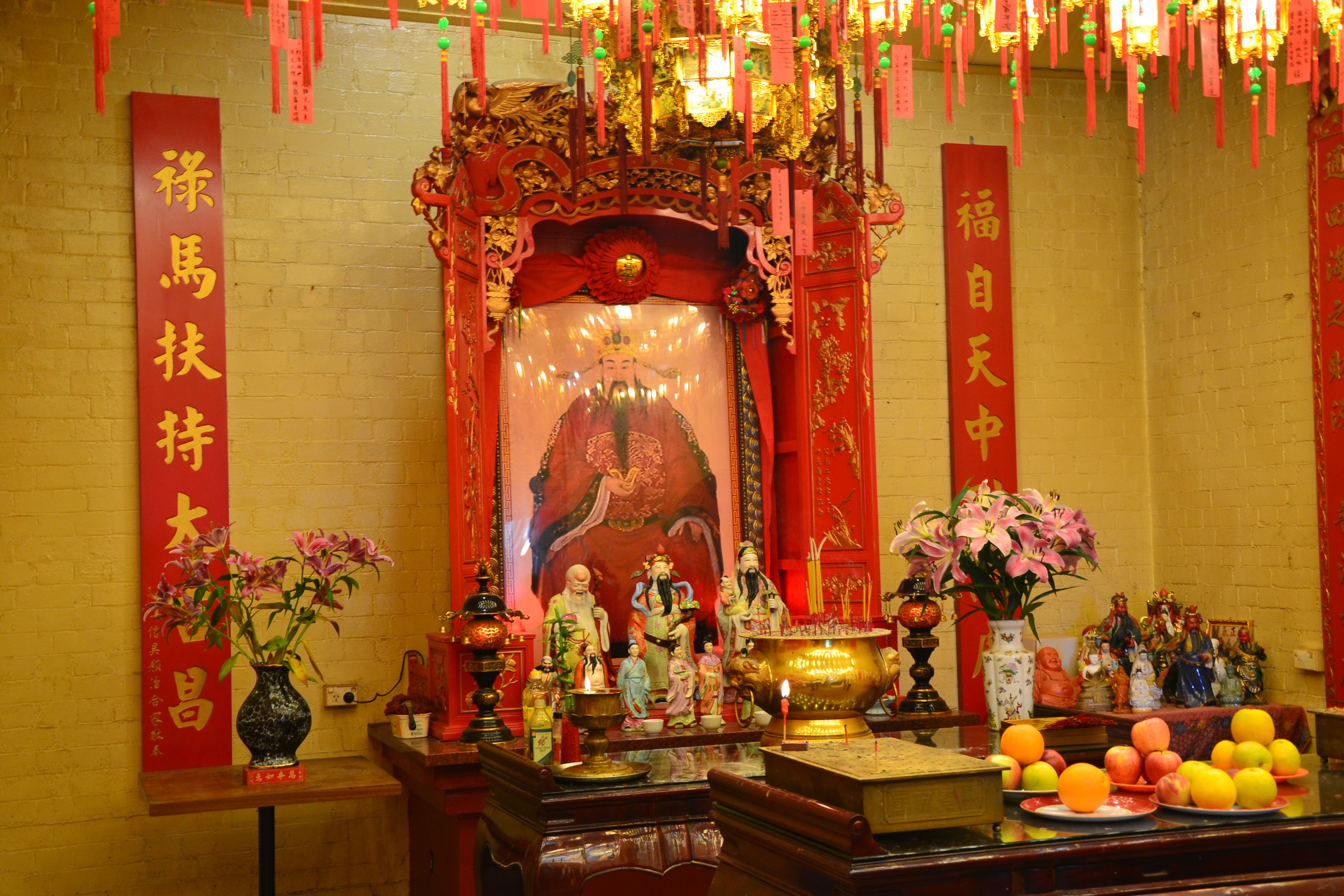
Kwan Ti shrine

The Leichhardt area was originally inhabited by the Wangal clan of Aborigines. After 1788 diseases such as smallpox and the loss of their hunting grounds caused huge reductions in their numbers and they moved further inland. Since European settlement the foreshores of Blackwattle Bay and Rozelle Bay have developed a unique maritime, industrial and residential character - a character which continues to evolve as areas which were originally residential estates, then industrial areas, are redeveloped for residential units and parklands.

The first formal grant in the Glebe area was a 162-hectare (400-acre) grant to Rev. Richard Johnson, the colony's first chaplain, in 1789. The Glebe (land allocated for the maintenance of a church minister) comprised rolling shale hills covering sandstone, with several sandstone cliff faces. The ridges were drained by several creeks including Blackwattle Creek, Orphan School Creek and Johnston Creek. Extensive swampland surrounded the creeks. On the shale ridges, heavily timbered woodlands contained several varieties of eucalypts while the swamplands and tidal mudflats had mangroves, swamp oaks (Casuarina glauca) and blackwattles (Callicoma serratifolia) after which the bay is named. Blackwattle Swamp was first mentioned by surveyors in the 1790s and Blackwattle Swamp Bay in 1807. By 1840 it was called Blackwattle Bay. Boat parties collected wattles and reeds for the building of huts, and kangaroos and emus were hunted by the early settlers who called the area the Kangaroo Ground. Rozelle Bay is thought to have been named after a schooner which once moored in its waters.

Johnson's land remained largely undeveloped until 1828, when the Church and School Corporation subdivided it into 28 lots, three of which they retained for church use. The Church sold 27 allotments in 1828 - north on the point and south around Broadway. The Church kept the middle section where the Glebe Estate is now. Up until the 1970s the Glebe Estate was in the possession of the Church. On the point the sea breezes attracted the wealthy who built villas. The Broadway end attracted slaughterhouses and boiling down works that used the creek draining to Blackwattle Swamp. Smaller working-class houses were built around these industries. Abbattoirs were built there from the 1860s. When Glebe was made a municipality in 1859 there were pro and anti-municipal clashes in the streets. From 1850 Glebe was dominated by wealthier interests.

Reclaiming the swamp, Wentworth Park opened in 1882 as a cricket ground and lawn bowls club. Rugby union football was played there in the late 19th century. The dog racing started in 1932. In the early 20th century modest villas were broken up into boarding houses as they were elsewhere in the inner city areas. The wealthier moved into the suburbs which were opening up through the railways. Up until the 1950s Sydney was the location for working class employment - it was a port and industrial city. By the 1960s central Sydney was becoming a corporate city with service-based industries - capital intensive not labour-intensive. A shift in demographics occurred, with younger professionals and technical and administrative people servicing the corporate city wanting to live close by. Housing was coming under threat and the heritage conservation movement was starting. The Fish Markets moved in in the 1970s. An influx of students came to Glebe in the 1960s and 1970s.

=== Allen family and the Toxteth Park Estate ===
Much of Glebe, including the temple site, was acquired by lawyer George Allen (1800–77) in 1827. Allen named his estate Toxteth Park Estate and had a house designed by eminent colonial architect John Verge (1772-1861). The house was completed in 1834, named after the home of the family's friend Sir Robert Wigram. Toxteth Park was a rectangular two-storey block with single-storey wings, a stone-flagged verandah on two sides, with the kitchen and servants' quarters behind. During extensions in 1878-81 the ground floor was renovated, but the present-day long drawing-room and bay window retain many original features.

The son of a London physician who died in financial straits, Allen was brought to Australia by his widowed mother and became the first solicitor to be trained in this country. An active Wesleyan, he established what became a successful legal firm. He married Jane Bowden in 1823 and she produced five boys and five girls who survived infancy, the most noteworthy, historically, being George Wigram Allen in 1824. By 1831 he had acquired 39 hectares (96 acres) of Glebe land and commissioned John Verge to build Toxteth Park, the foundation stone for which was laid on 21 March 1829. Allen also led an active public life, serving as Mayor of Sydney (1844–45), President of the Bank of New South Wales (1860–66), MLC (1845–73) and Fellow of the Senate at the University of Sydney (1859–77). Today the legal firm of Allen, Allen & Hemsley still maintains a high profile in Sydney and their corporate contemporary art collection, exceeding 1,000 paintings, embraces the theme of "art in the workplace".

Son of Jane and the previously-named George Allen, who was articled to his father, George Wigram Allen entered the law practice in 1847, which continued to expand as a thriving enterprise. He also inherited his father's enthusiasm for religion (helping to create the YMCA), public affairs, the University of Sydney Senate (1878–85) and business. G. W. Allen (1824–85) was involved in the incorporation of Glebe as a municipality, becoming its first Mayor in 1859, a post he held for 18 years. From 1869-82 he represented Glebe in the Legislative Assembly, was Speaker from 1875–82 and for these many services was knighted in 1884.

During that time he sponsored the reclamation of Wentworth Park and, together with Edmund Blacket and Glebe Council members, was responsible for Glebe's water supply and gas lighting as well as the construction of new streets. The Allens, both father and son, were keen cricketers and built a private ground in what is now bounded by Glebe Point and Toxteth Roads and Mansfield and Boyce Streets. It was here that Frederick Spofforth, a great bowler who lived in Derwent Street, frequently played. Upon his father's death in 1877 G. W. Allen made extensive additions to Toxteth Park, when a third storey, tower and ballroom were added. However Sir George did not live so long after his father (he lived at Toxteth Park Estate until 1885) and subsequently this stalwart Wesleyan's house, in 1901, was sold to the Sisters of the Good Samaritan, a Benedictine Order, which is today St Scholastica's College. He had amassed a fortune of £300,000 by the time of his death. Two nearby street names recall the first owners of the home - Wigram and Allen. The Toxteth Park Estate included Harold Park to the west and downhill from Toxteth Park Lodge. Harold Park was part of Allen's Toxteth Park Estate (now reduced and renamed St Scholastica's). Allen leased Harold Park to Joynton Smith who ran a small proprietary race track. It went to the Harness Racing Association in 1912.

Lady Allen's charitable interests helped to establish the Royal Alexandra Hospital for Children, which until quite recently focused on the health of Sydney's children - the hospital is now closed and the large site is developing into a new housing area to be known as the City Quarter.

=== Sze Yup Temple ===
When Chinese settlers in Sydney decided to build a temple dedicated to the Chinese folk hero and god, Kwan Ti (sometimes Kwun Ti, or Kwung Ti), they prayed for a sign showing where the temple should be built. This led them to a market garden in Francis Street (now Edward Street) in Glebe which they purchased from the owner for £325. The temple was funded by immigrants from the area known as Sze Yup (Siyi) area of Guangdong province, China.

The impetus to establish the Temple came from the Sze Yup community in NSW in the early 1890s, during a period of widespread hardship throughout the Australian community and a time of higher levels of racial tension. People from the Sze Yup County were regarded as being particularly religious. The proposal was supported by local Chinese organizations including the Chinese Masonic Society and well-known local figures including Johnny Moi Sing, Grandmaster of the Society. Advice was received from the Melbourne Sze Yup Temple Trustees. Funds were obtained from the Sze Yup Society levies, fundraising and donations.

The renowned Sze Yup Temple is dedicated to Kwan Ti, a warrior and patriot in the era of the Three Kingdoms 220 - 265 AD. Kwan Ti is famous for his loyalty, physical prowess and masculinity. In Australia, immigrant Chinese worshipped him as a wise judge, a guide and a protector. Many important business decisions, for example, were not made until Kwan Ti had been consulted for his guidance and blessing.

The central temple in the Sze Yup complex was built in 1898. The simple red brick cottage was designed with the principles of Feng Shui in mind; it was located on land that sloped from the temple to the waters of Rozelle Bay. Inside the central temple is an altar with embroidered images of Kwan Ti and his guards, racks which hold Kwan Ti's Red Hair Horse and weapons, engraved couplets, prayers, a huge drum and gong and two beautiful carved columns which date from 1898.

Lots 1 and 2 of the subdivision of Lot 23 of the Eglington Estate, the original Temple site, were purchased from Elizabeth Downes in 1897 for £125, close to a "Chinamens garden" (market gardens) that extended from the site northwest to Blackwattle Bay. The land formed part of the Toxteth Park (Allen) Estate, which remained substantially intact till the 1890s. The Estate created a pleasure ground setting with cricket ground, orchards and gardens.

Covenants on the title explicitly required that any building to be erected on the land had to be "in keeping with the condition of the surrounding properties already erected or being erected on the Toxteth Estate", and "would not depreciate the value of any...surrounding properties".

It was clear that both vendor and purchasers understood that a Chinese temple was to be built on the land. The covenant stated that it "should in no way be deemed to...refer to the erection of any house for the purpose of religion or Chinese joss house and caretakers residence which shall be properly and substantially built."

A local builder (a Mr Stewart or Mr Stuart) built the central hall in 1898, and appears to have built the adjoining halls in 1903. A memorandum of agreement signed between the Trustees and an insurance manager for a mortgage refers to plans and specifications, which have not been located.

A delegation from the Melbourne Sze Yup Temple attended the dedication of the Temple to Guan Di. The dedication of the 1903 halls and subsequent celebrations over three days was reported in The Sydney Mail of 3 February 1904, reporting great excitement amongst Chinese and European onlookers. Representatives of all major Chinese communities in Sydney attended.

The organiser of the celebrations, James Ah Chuey (Wong Chuey), was a well-known grazier and wool broker from the Riverina, grandmaster of the Chinese Masonic Society and Trustee from 1923 to 1948.

In 1904 the temple was flanked by two chapels, the Chapel of Departed Friends and the Chapel of Good Fortune.

For the Chinese community in Sydney the Sze Yup Temple was a cultural centre as well as a place for worship. It was here that they could find social contact and companionship, material assistance or accommodation for travellers, new migrants and the sick. Celebrations and festivals such as the colourful and lively Chinese New Year took place at the temple. It was also used to house the bones of the deceased, before they were taken to China in urns for permanent burial, as tradition demanded.

On 19 July 1985 a Permanent Conservation Order was made over the site. It was transferred to the State Heritage Register on 2 April 1999. After 100 years, the Sze Yup Temple remains a sacred place to the Chinese community. Worshippers now include new arrivals from Hong Kong, Malaysia, Singapore, Taiwan, China and, in particular, Indo-China.

Subsequent purchases of adjoining lots were made as funds permitted to open the vista from the Temple to Blackwattle Bay for Guan Di. A third block (Lot 3) was purchased from Myles Augustus Downes in 1898, and the final block in front of the temple building (Lot 22) was purchased from Anne Pattison in 1918. Three cottages were erected and rented to provide for the temple upkeep.

The Temple Trustees represented the four Districts of Sze Yup. The responsibility for managing the Temple in the early years was rotated among the leading Sze Yup general stores in Sydney. The Temple Trustees were recorded as having modest occupations but appeared to be well-connected to the Chinese Masonic Society and the Yee Hing Society, the Chinese nationalist movement.

The Temple acted as a cultural centre for the Chinese community, providing opportunities for mutual assistance, social contact, religious observances, celebration of festivities, settlement of disputes, funeral arrangements and temporary accommodation for travellers. Bones of deceased settlers were stored in urns awaiting their return to China for permanent burial.

As the local Chinese population aged and dwindled during the years of the White Australia Policy, upkeep of the Temple became more difficult for the Trustees. Council rates were demanded until 1967. In 1951 Sydney City Council began to resume a part of the grounds (Lot 22) as a pre-school kindergarten, but after Trustee objections and involvement of the Chinese Consul-General, Council transferred the land back to the Trustees in 1955. The Sydney County Council resumed the eastern corner of the property for an electrical sub-station built in 1951. A fire in the central hall in 1952 damaged the roof structure, and the fabric of the building deteriorated before and after repairs in 1953-1954. The need for ongoing funding attracted developers and proposals were made during the 1960s to redevelop the lower end of the site. However these proposals did not proceed, and the uniqueness of the place was retained.

Following refugee intakes from China and Vietnam and the repeal of the White Australia Policy in the 1970s, attendance at the Temple increased, and donations began to flow in. Fundraising by the Trustees in 1977 was successful, and by 1979 work was carried out to address fabric damage and meet the needs of the recently arrived worshippers of Guan Di and Cai Bai Xing. Festivals grew in size and incense smoke in the temple became a health issue, so exhaust fans, new electrical wiring and lighting were installed.

Debate had begun again in the 1970s about the future of the Temple buildings. Some recent worshippers believed that the Temple should be demolished and rebuilt as a larger modern structure to accommodate increasing numbers of visitors. Others wanted to modernise the existing structure with green glazed roof tiles imported from Taiwan. There was much criticism of the original corrugated tin roofs of the 1898-1903 buildings.

The newly-formed Heritage Council of NSW acting under the 1977 Heritage Act, believing that the original Glebe temple was a unique historical record and contributed to Australian society and culture, commenced negotiations with the Trustees to place a Permanent Conservation Order over the Temple and grounds, to ensure that this valuable legacy was retained for the whole community. The negotiations concluded in 1984 with a gazetted Permanent Conservation Order and an agreed Masterplan for future community development on the land in 1985 that respected the importance and values of the original temple buildings and grounds.

The continuing growth of worshippers following the 1979 upgrading attracted attention, and Taiwan representatives in Sydney offered a large donation to help build a large gateway and perimeter wall around the block (much to the disapproval of the local People's Republic of China representatives). The gateway and associated walling was completed and formally opened in 1983.

Throughout the 1990s, debate continued over the roles of the Temple and a number of proposals for community uses were made. In 2003 Council refused a development application for a two-storey community hall and office complex to the east of the Temple building, on the basis of overdevelopment of the site, loss of heritage significance, anticipated traffic generation, and loss of significant curtilage and mature trees around the temple building. In 2008, a fire described as "deliberately lit" destroyed one of its buildings.

== Description ==
The site of the Sze Yup Temple is bounded on four sides by street frontage being Victoria Road, Edward Street, Eglington Lane and Edward Lane. The total site area is approximately 3,774 square metres (40,620 sq ft).

A masonry fence bounds the site and the main entrance gateway front Edward Street. A secondary pedestrian entry and vehicular access is from Eglington Lane.

The central temple in the Sze Yup complex is constructed of red-brick reminiscent of village temples in the southern provinces of China. Mounted above the entrance is a sign that reads "The Temple of Kwan Ti", dated the 29th year of Guangxu Emperor Kuang Shu. Planning of the three halls separated by external side passages and roofed with small scaled pitched roofs to open lightwells is a typical temple type. The front verandah has bullnosed roofing and cast iron columns. The brickwork detailing has been happily adapted from the Edwardian to echo traditional construction. Inside the temple is an altar with embroidered images of Kwan Ti and his guards. Racks hold Kwan Ti's Red Hair Horse and weapons. Engraved couplets and prayers hang on the walls in front of a huge drum and gong. Two beautiful carved columns date from 1898 and were originally intended for one of the nearby chapels but was too tall. On the wall are four sets of couplets which praise the virtues of Kwan Ti and express wishes for peace and tranquillity.

The building as originally sited to a water aspect (Blackwattle Bay) and subsequent land purchased in front of the temple and the buildings demolished, provided an auspicious setting for the temple. The importance attached to the concepts of "Feng Shui" in the temple and surroundings has prevented building to the front of the temple, and has a strong influence on the management of the site.

The central chapel is flanked by two chapels, the Chapel of Departed Friends (to the north) and the Chapel of Good Fortune (to the south). The site also contains toilet facilities in a separate structure adjacent to the temple (to the north-east) and a storage shed at the rear (south) of the temple.

=== Condition ===
As of 29 August 1997, the condition of the Template was excellent. The temple fabric is in excellent condition and most of the elements that retain the place's significance have not been compromised. The original building curtilage remains, and many plantings exist from the early to mid-20th century. The curtilage remains little disturbed. Late 20th century changes to the place, such as the introduction of ventilation systems, replacement of a skylight and the construction of a new entrance gate, perimeter wall and small service buildings (e.g., a new toilet block and storeroom), have enhanced the cultural values of the place with minor impact on historical values.

=== Modifications and dates ===
- 1898 – Initial Temple constructed.
- 1904 – Two Temple chapels/wings added.
- 1953 – Temple damaged by fire destroying the roof of the central hall and many of the furnishings. Rebuilt in 1955.
- 1978 – Temple partially restored including re-roofing, painting, drainage, ventilation and lighting.
- 1981 – Toilet block built
- 1982 – Archway added to the Temple complex with two stone lions guarding the entrance.

== Heritage listing ==
As at 31 January 2008, the Sze Yup Temple is an item of State heritage significance as a rare and intact example of a Chinese temple in Australia. It is one of only two remaining places of worship for ethnic Chinese in New South Wales that predates the 1960s. It is one of four early (pre-World War 1) Chinese temples that remain active in Australia, the other being Yiu Ming Temple located at Alexandria, (Sydney), See Yup temple in South Melbourne and at Breakfast Creek, Brisbane. The Sze Yup Temple has been continuously used by the Chinese community since it was built, and is a focus for the identity of the Sze Yup community in NSW and for those involved with traditional Chinese culture and belief. This tradition, intact temple is considered to be of both local and international significance.

The Chinese community in Australia was instrumental, but unacknowledged, in the development of 19th Century Australian mining, agricultural, pastoral and furniture-making industries, and later in the growth of Australian import-export industries. In many parts of Australia in the 19th Century, Chinese at times exceeded numbers of European residents, leading to unique friendships and hostilities, particularly as economic-based competition.

The Temple and its extensive grounds reflect the architectural forms and landscaping of the Sze Yup County in Guangdong Province, China. The building form reflects that of many "village" temples of this area. The Glebe Temple successfully adapted local materials and construction techniques, and its fabric is in excellent condition.

The Temple and grounds demonstrate elements of the belief system of "feng shui" in the location, forms and orientation of built and landscape elements, and in the extended visual curtilage of the site to Rozelle Bay and Balmain in the north-west.

The Temple is dedicated to Guan Di (Kwan Ti), a virtuous and revered military figure of the Three Kingdoms Period (AD220-AD280). Guan Di is worshipped widely throughout the Chinese diaspora. The Temple is well known for its accumulated "good luck".

The 1898 central hall accommodated the Guan Di shrine, and the 1903 eastern and western halls respectively accommodate an ancestral hall, and a hall dedicated to Cai Bai Xing (Choi Buk Sing), the popular god of wealth. Families with memorial plaques in the Ancestral Hall, or those donating funds or images to the place retain a close connection with the Temple.

The Temple and grounds provide a venue for large community celebrations through the year, as well as serving the needs of individual worshippers. Over time a number of Chinese organizations maintaining traditional Chinese cultural activities such as martial arts and lion dances, use the place for practice and performance, supporting the Temple's ongoing role as a community focus for the local Chinese community.

Sze Yup Temple was listed on the New South Wales State Heritage Register on 2 April 1999 having satisfied the following criteria.

The place is important in demonstrating the course, or pattern, of cultural or natural history in New South Wales.

The site has evidence of continuous Chinese occupation at least since the 1880s when a Chinese market garden was shown at this location. The place and setting and its contents informs us of the largely undocumented life of the Chinese community in Australia from the late 19th Century.

The 1898-1904 Glebe Sze Yup Kwan Ti temple is the only actively-used pre World War One Chinese temple in Australia to retain its original setting and visual curtilage. (Other active pre World War one temples in urban areas have lost their original rural outlook, such as the Alexandria Yiu Ming temple, the Melbourne Sze Yup temple, or the San Sheng Guan temple in Breakfast Creek, Brisbane).

The place has a strong or special association with a person, or group of persons, of importance of cultural or natural history of New South Wales's history.

The Temple has special associations with the Sze Yup Chinese community in NSW and other states, the Sze Yup counties in Guangdong Province providing one of the largest sources of immigrants to Australia in the 19th Century.

The place is important in demonstrating aesthetic characteristics and/or a high degree of creative or technical achievement in New South Wales.

The temple building is a rare example of a traditional 3 hall temple layout with Edwardian-influenced building elements and detailing demonstrating local cultural adaption, such as corrugated iron roofs, and a bull-nosed corrugated iron porch roof supported by cast iron columns.

The interior fittings and objects sourced from China represent excellent examples of late 19th Century Chinese decorative arts. As many similar pieces have been damaged or destroyed over the past century in China and elsewhere, the aesthetic significance of this material is very high.

The temple siting amongst mature culturally-significant trees and its prospect to the waters of Blackwattle Bay, provides a rare and intact demonstration of 'feng shui'- traditional geomantic practices in planning.

The place has a strong or special association with a particular community or cultural group in New South Wales for social, cultural or spiritual reasons.

The Sze Yup temple has remained a cultural, religious and social centre for the Sze Yup community and others since 1898. The role of the Trustees in assisting community members extended to temporary accommodation, financial support and help in maintaining contact with families in China. The Trustees arranged for the storage and transport of the bones of Sze Yup-born "sojourners" to China for permanent burial.

The temple strongly communicates a sense of community identity and continuity. Painted and carved panels inside the halls list original donors to the Temple, and some in the community are able to identify forebears and relatives.

Following the repeal of restrictive immigration legislation in the early 1970s, the temple now provides a cultural and religious centre for many ethnic Chinese settlers displaced from Vietnam and nearby countries. The temple has become well known for its accumulated "good luck" attributed to its favourable setting for its "gods" and ancestral tablets.

The place has potential to yield information that will contribute to an understanding of the cultural or natural history of New South Wales.

The temple building demonstrates technical adaption to local conditions and materials, and the building's layout, landscape, built elements, fixtures, fittings and decorations, are areas for future research into the cultural and spiritual significance of Chinese beliefs.

There is potential archaeological material in the immediate surroundings of the temple and grounds that may provide information on Chinese occupation of this area prior to 1898, and of Chinese occupation from 1900 to the 1970s.

The layout and siting of the temple building retains evidence of the application of the traditional Chinese belief system of feng shui. Elements of feng shui include the retention of visual cartilages particularly the temple's north-western outlook to the skyline and to water the placement and spatial relationship of structures and planting, and the building's orientation and scale. This aspect has led to the place's increasing cultural significance over time, as the accumulated "good" feng shui of the place becomes wider-known.

The place possesses uncommon, rare or endangered aspects of the cultural or natural history of New South Wales.

The Glebe Sze Yup temple is the only extant 19th Century Chinese temple in NSW, and one of five intact 19th Century temple structures known in Australia. The others are at Atherton, Breakfast Creek, South Melbourne and Bendigo. The Glebe Sze Yup temple is the only active, early Chinese temple in Australia to retain its original setting and visual curtilage. The temple has been continuously-used by the Chinese community since 1898.

The place is important in demonstrating the principal characteristics of a class of cultural or natural places/environments in New South Wales.

The building demonstrates the three hall layout common to many southern Chinese village or small town temples. The one hall and three hall layouts were in evidence in all the Chinese temples that were built to serve 19th Century Chinese communities in Australia.

The temple's built form reflects the scale and simple decorative characteristics of temples in the Sze Yup ('4 counties') area of Guangdong Province, and south of the Provincial capital, Guangzhou. The Yiu Ming temple at Alexandria, by comparison, demonstrates distinctly different applied forms and decorations.

== See also ==
- Taoism & Chinese folk religion
- Yiu Ming Temple, another historic Chinese temple in Sydney
- Holy Triad Temple, Albion, City of Brisbane, Queensland
- Hou Wang Temple, Atherton, Queensland
