= Hou Wang Temple =

Historical structure in Atherton, Tablelands Region, Queensland, Australia

Atherton Chinese Temple
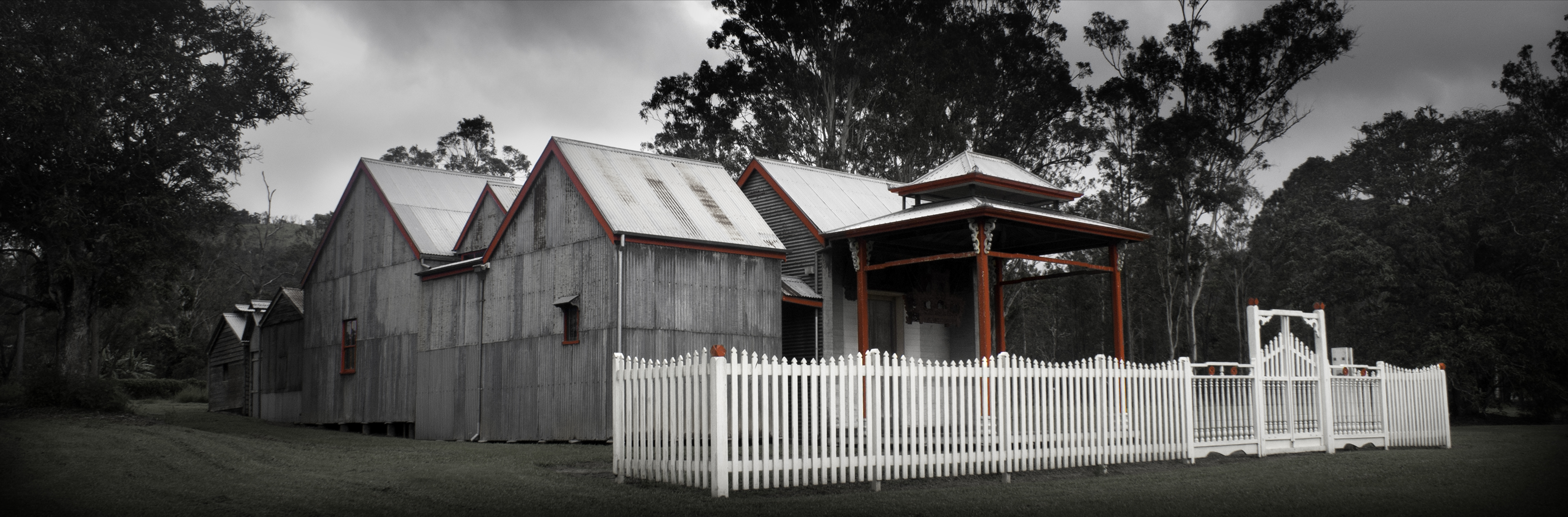
- Atherton Chinese Temple, 2010

- Location within Queensland Location within Australia
- 17.278839°S 145.471842°E
- Location: Herberton Road, Atherton, Tablelands Region, Queensland, Australia

History
- Design period: 1900–1914 (early 20th century)
- Built: 1903

Queensland Heritage Register
- Official name: Hou Wang Miau, Atherton Chinese Temple, Joss House
- Type: state heritage (built, archaeological)
- Designated: 21 October 1992
- Reference no.: 600010
- Significant period: 1903 (fabric); 1903–1970s (historical)
- Significant components: carving, hall, store/s / storeroom / storehouse, kitchen/kitchen house, residential accommodation – staff quarters, objects (movable) – religion/worship, temple, furniture/fittings, fence/wall – perimeter

The Hou Wang Temple is a heritage-listed former temple and now museum at Herberton Road, Atherton, Tablelands Region, Queensland, Australia. Built in 1903, it is one of the oldest original Chinese temples in Australasia. It is also known as Hou Wang Miau, Atherton Joss House and Atherton Chinese Temple.

It is one of only two or three temples outside China known to be dedicated to Hou Wang and is the only surviving timber and iron temple in Queensland. The temple contains a substantial number of original artifacts. Most were made in China during the late 19th and early 20th centuries, especially for this temple. They include a clapperless bell manufactured about 1895 and numerous intricately carved timber panels. It was once the socio-religious focus for over 1,000 Chinese residents who worked as timber cutters, market gardeners and maize growers.

The temple and the land it stands on was purchased by a group of Chinese families, who donated it to the National Trust of Queensland. It was added to the Queensland Heritage Register on 21 October 1992. The temple's restoration was completed on 15 September 2002, and it now includes an art gallery and interpretation centre. The temple and gallery are open to the public six days a week, (closed Mondays).

== History ==
The Atherton Chinese Temple was built in 1903 by the community of the Chinatown at Atherton using local materials for construction and furnishings ordered especially from China. It provided a social and spiritual focus for over a thousand people in the township and the surrounding area.

Atherton Chinatown was one of many small settlements that developed in Australia during the nineteenth century as homes for the Chinese sojourners who arrived in great numbers to work on the goldfields. Most of these Chinese were males who came from poor areas in south west China and intended to work here until they had gathered enough capital to assure their financial security on their return home. For mutual support and to maintain contacts with their homeland, they lived and worked together, creating such Chinatowns within European settlements, or on their fringes.

Chinese diggers flocked to north Queensland in the 1870s in large numbers following the discovery of gold on the Palmer River and on the Hodgkinson. They were regarded with suspicion and hostility by Europeans, who they greatly outnumbered, and were barred from working on newly discovered mineral fields. Because of this, and as the Palmer River field was faded in importance, most Chinese moved south looking for other means to make a living.

They arrived in the Atherton area in the early 1880s, working with European timber getters, and set up a camp on the opposite side of Piebald Creek to the tiny European settlement of Prior's Pocket. In 1885, this area was surveyed and officially named Atherton. Land sales took place and although the Chinese were not allowed to own land, many entered into leases with Europeans and began farming. They grew fruit and vegetables to supply nearby towns and pioneered the growing of maize in north Queensland, which became an important commercial crop. Chinatown grew to service Chinese people in and around Atherton and by 1897 was a thriving residential and commercial centre.

In the 1890s, it was decided to build a temple to serve what was now quite a large community. Funds were collected and furnishings were ordered from China. In 1903, the temple was constructed of local cedar and black bean timber and corrugated iron. Brick was the material usually chosen for temples in Australia and the painting of the front wall to resemble this material suggests that the community would have preferred brick, had it been readily available. The temple complex consisted of a temple dedicated to the god Hou Wang, a feasting hall, kitchen and store. It had living quarters for a caretaker and provided accommodation for those visiting the temple from the outlying district. During the 1900s, when Chinatown was at the height of its importance, the temple was a social and spiritual centre for over a thousand people.

Following the First World War, Chinese leases on agricultural land in the district were revoked in favour of soldier settlers. During the nineteen twenties, most of the inhabitants of Chinatown and the surrounding farms moved south or to nearby coastal towns. Many of the buildings in Chinatown were demolished and removed, some being reused locally. A caretaker remained at the temple which was used by a few old men who remained in the township.

Although some repairs were carried out, without a community to support it, the temple fell into disrepair. A cyclone in 1956 blew away the pagoda, which was replaced by a lean-to. Damage also occurred from water leakage. In the 1960s artefacts were removed from the temple, including the image of Hou Wang and other gods. Some of these artefacts have since been returned. The temple was used intermittently for worship until the early 1970s and contains objects connected with this later use. The land on which the temple stands was purchased in 1965 by several local Chinese families.

In 1975, the National Trust of Queensland, who had been aware of the temple for some time, gained funding to begin investigative work. In 1977 the area was surveyed, as the Fong On family had offered the temple to the Trust to ensure its preservation. At about the same time cataloging of the remaining artefacts in the temple began. The temple was transferred to the Trust in 1980 and conservation work on the buildings began. It is now interpreted as a place museum.

== Description ==
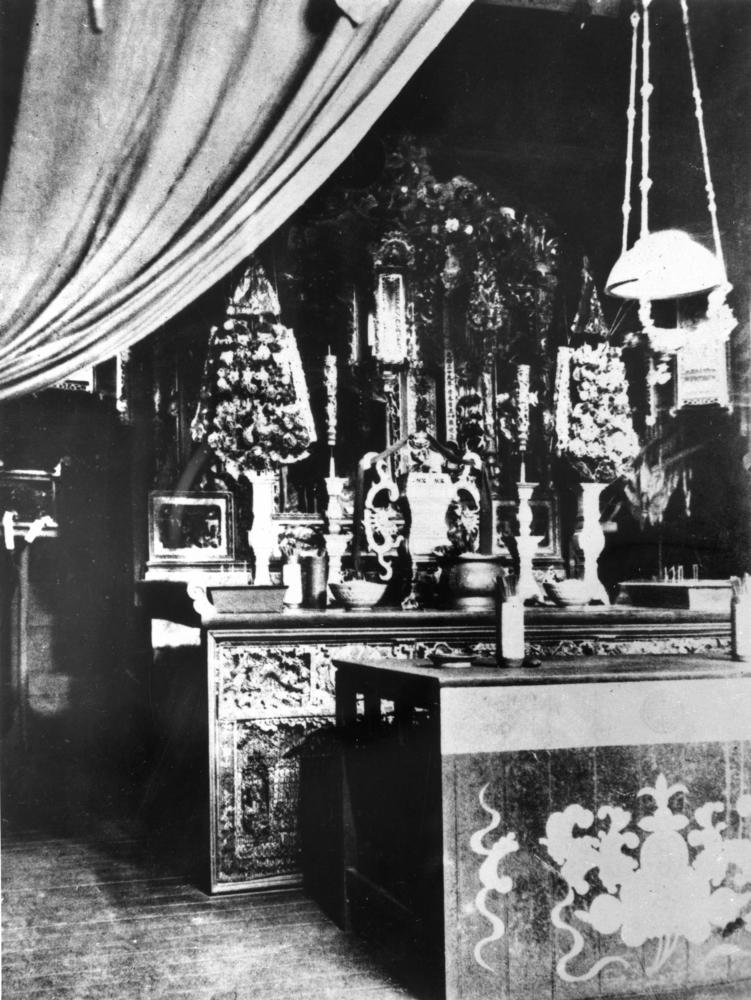
Interior of the Joss House in Atherton, 1929

The temple complex is situated in an open, grassed area which is the site of the former Chinatown. Its positioning suggests that geomancy was used to select the most auspicious site and alignment for the buildings. The complex consists of a temple, hall, kitchen and store constructed of corrugated iron and local timbers in a traditional Chinese form.

The buildings are marked off from the street by an ornamental picket fence and gate which have been reconstructed from photographs and archaeological investigation. The temple building is fronted by a pagoda consisting of the upper section of the original roof mounted on a new base. Inside, the space is divided into an entrance area separated by doors from the area which contains the altar and a heavenly well. This is a section of raised pagoda roof which is designed to admit light and to allow incense to rise from the large burner below. It is glazed to keep out rain and is supported on posts which display a deliberate irregularity to symbolize human imperfection.

The interior of the temple is lined with unpainted cedar and is decorated with carvings, painted metal wall panels and temple furnishings which were imported from China. Much of the carving is embellished with vermilion and gold paint.

On the left side of the building as one faces the altar, a door provides access to the adjacent community hall. This is a plainer, more functional building and contains a bedroom for the caretaker, and a room for meetings and ceremonial banquets. There is a clerestory similar to the one in the temple and evidence of Chinese notices and graffiti survive on the unpainted walls. Behind the hall are two small buildings which contained a store and kitchen. Both are timber framed and clad, unpainted inside with earth floors. The kitchen has a galvanised fire recess. Much of these two buildings has been reconstructed.

The buildings are raised on hardwood stumps. Structural members are made of black bean (Castanospermum australe) and the ceilings, wall linings and joinery are made from red cedar (Toona australis). Red penda and kalantis have been substituted for these no longer common timbers where reconstruction work was necessary for conservation. Both of these timbers are very close to the original in appearance.

Paths edged with upturned bottles, an indentation which indicates the position of the pig roasting pit and archaeological remains survive. Artefacts which were placed in temporary storage are being replaced in the temple as they are conserved. These include carvings, carved banners and the temple bell on its stand. There are also substantial archaeological collections.

== Heritage listing ==
The Atherton Chinese Temple was listed on the Queensland Heritage Register on 21 October 1992 having satisfied the following criteria:

- The place is important in demonstrating the evolution or pattern of Queensland's history.

As a temple complex which serviced a major Chinese settlement and farming community on the Atherton Tablelands, it is important in demonstrating the role which the Chinese played in the development of north Queensland.

- The place demonstrates rare, uncommon or endangered aspects of Queensland's cultural heritage.

It is the only surviving timber and iron temple in Queensland; is the only temple outside China known to be dedicated to Hou Wang and contains a substantial number of original artefacts.

- The place has potential to yield information that will contribute to an understanding of Queensland's history.

It has the potential to contribute to an understanding of Queensland's history by demonstrating aspects of the lifestyle and beliefs of Chinese sojourners in Queensland.

- The place is important because of its aesthetic significance.

It has aesthetic qualities which are valued by the community and reflects the cultural traditions that the Chinese brought with them to Australia.

- The place has a strong or special association with a particular community or cultural group for social, cultural or spiritual reasons.

It has a special association with the Chinese community of Atherton who made an important contribution to the development of agriculture in the area.

- The place has a special association with the life or work of a particular person, group or organisation of importance in Queensland's history.

It has a special association with the Chinese community of Atherton who made an important contribution to the development of agriculture in the area.

== See also ==
- Holy Triad Temple, heritage-listed temple at 32 Higgs Street, Albion, City of Brisbane, Queensland
- Yiu Ming Temple, heritage-listed Chinese temple at 16–22 Retreat Street, Alexandria, City of Sydney, New South Wales
- Sze Yup Temple, heritage-listed Chinese temple at Victoria Road in the inner western Sydney suburb of Glebe, City of Sydney, New South Wales
- List of National Trust properties in Australia
