= Holy Triad Temple, Albion =

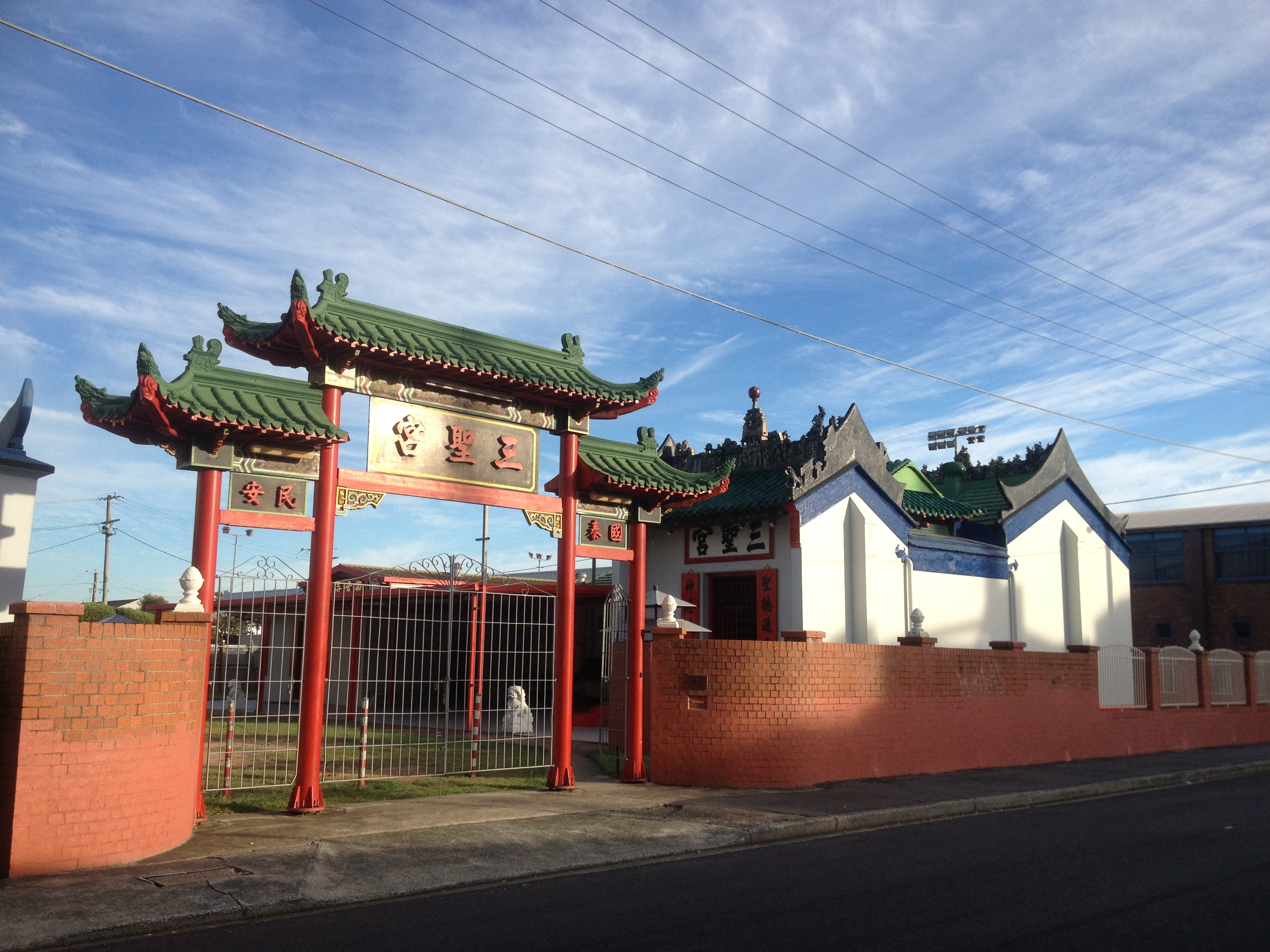
- Holy Triad Temple, Albion, 2014

- Location within Queensland Location within Australia
- 27.4393°S 153.0453°E
- Location: 32 Higgs Street, Albion, City of Brisbane, Queensland, Australia

History
- Design period: 1870s–1890s (late 19th century)
- Built: 1885–1886

Queensland Heritage Register
- Official name: The Holy Triad Temple, Breakfast Creek Joss House, Sarm Sung Goon
- Type: state heritage (built)
- Designated: 21 October 1992
- Reference no.: 600056
- Significant period: 1885–1886 (fabric)
- Significant components: gate – entrance, statue, wall/s, furniture/fittings

The Holy Triad Temple is a heritage-listed temple at 32 Higgs Street, Albion, City of Brisbane, Queensland, Australia. It was built from 1885 to 1886. It is also known as Breakfast Creek Joss House and Sarm Sung Goon. It was added to the Queensland Heritage Register on 21 October 1992.

== History ==
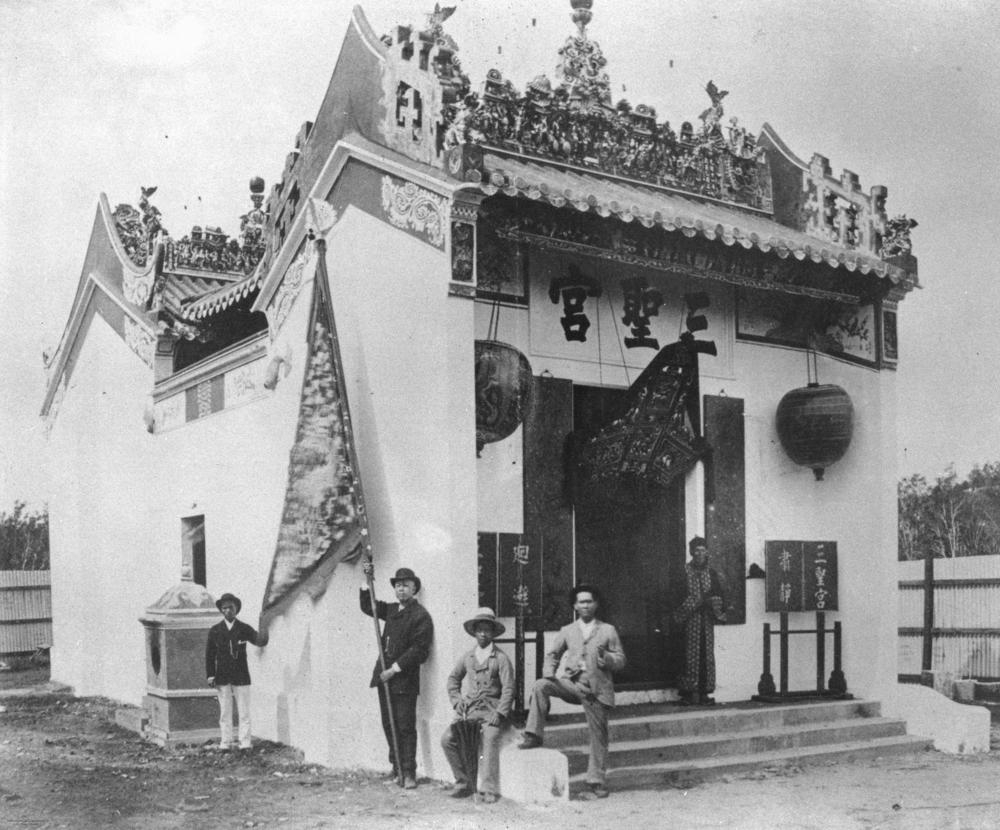
Temple, 1886

The Temple of the Holy Triad was constructed in 1885–1886 for the Cantonese Chinese community of Brisbane.

In the 1880s sizeable numbers of Cantonese settled in Brisbane. They were most conspicuous in small businesses (particularly in Fortitude Valley and along Albert Street), and in market gardening (especially on the flats around Breakfast Creek and Eagle Farm). By 1888 Brisbane depended almost entirely on the Chinese for its supply of fresh vegetables.

Construction of the temple was an attempt by the leaders of Brisbane's five Cantonese clans to provide their people with a community focus. The elaborate triple roof was imported from China by Quong Nam Tai & Co, Brisbane's most prominent Chinese trading firm, and the building was erected by Chinese artisans.

The temple was opened on 21 January 1886, and remained the focus of Chinese community activity in Brisbane for nearly sixty years. The first procession was led by Sum Chick Tong and George Shue, two of the trustees of the temple. This was followed by a period of declining interest and neglect until the Queensland Parliament passed the Chinese Temple Society Act of 1964 and the formation of the Chinese Temple Society in 1965.

The society undertook work on the temple and it was re-opened in June 1966. As part of the restoration, a caretaker was appointed. A premises for the caretaker was built next to the temple to accommodate for the caretaker. The temple today offers a focus for various Chinese communities.

From 1968 to 1988 the temple was maintained by an English woman, Dorothy Chick Tong. Dorothy Chick Tong was the wife of George Chick Tong, the song of the original trustee, Sum Chick Tong.

In the second half of the nineteenth century Chinese immigrants erected temples on most of the principal Queensland goldfields and ports. Only three temples survive in Queensland from this period: the Breakfast Creek temple, the small Chun Lo Goon temple at Rockhampton, and the Hou Wang Temple at Atherton. The latter is smaller than the Breakfast Creek temple and is constructed of local materials.

== Description ==
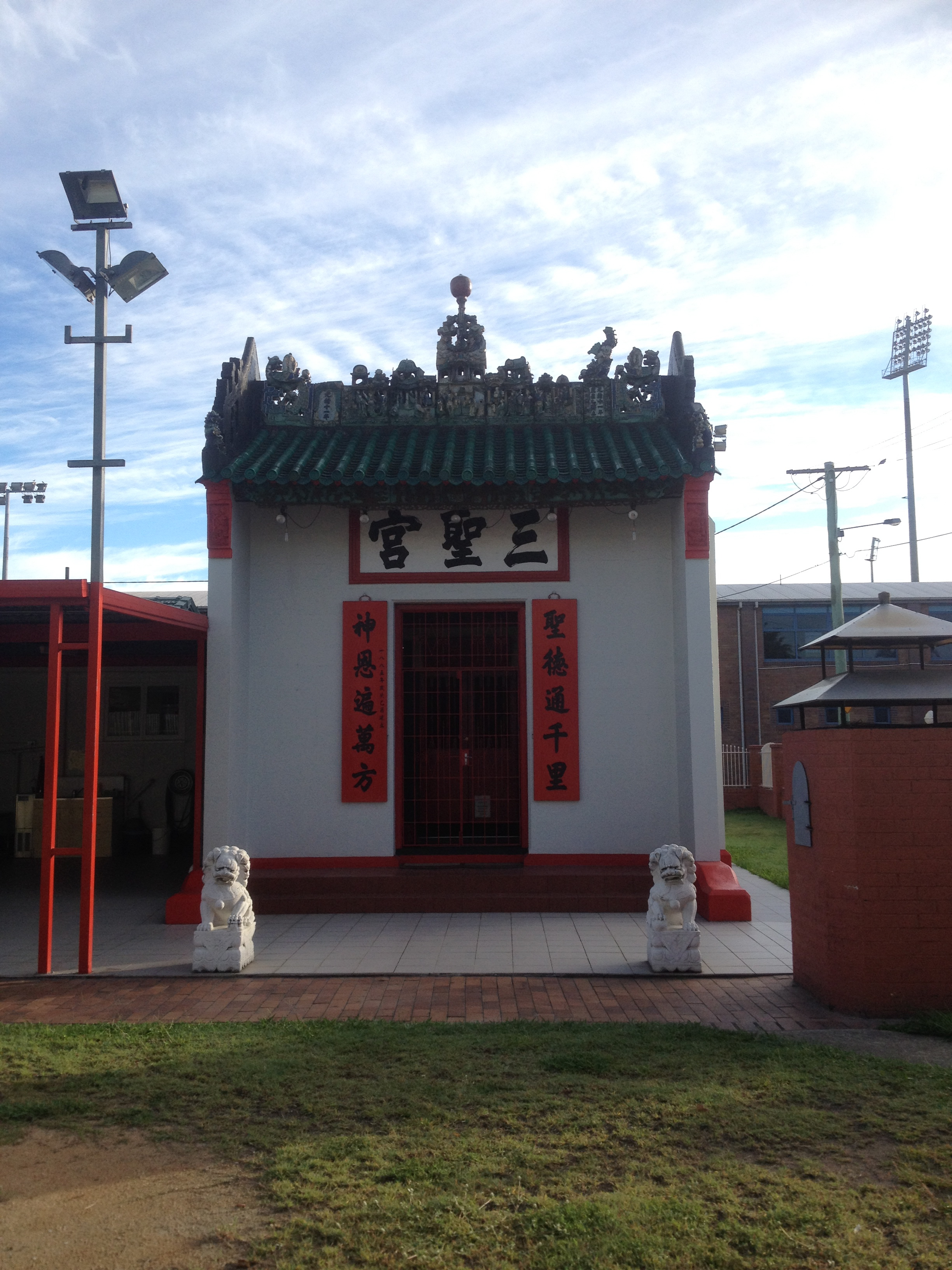
Entrance to the temple, 2014

The temple is a rectangular, rendered brick structure with a complex triple roof of Chinese terracotta tiles. A feature of this roof is the elaborate ceramic ornamentation, incorporating Chinese historical and mythological characters, on the ridges and bargeboards.

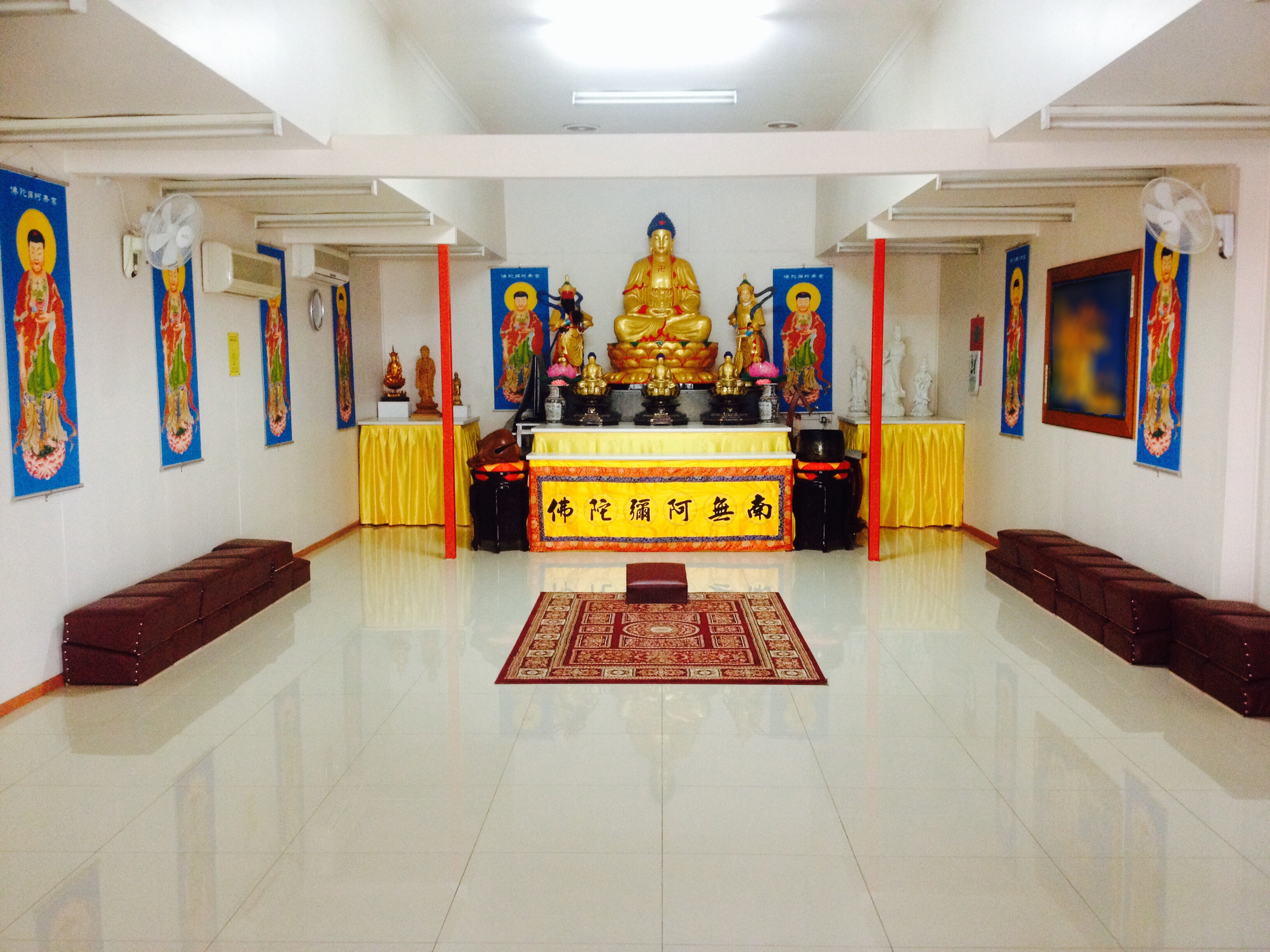
Altar, 2014

The interior comprises three sections: an entrance, a sky-lit middle section, and the temple proper with its carved altar and figures of the gods of wealth, medicine and knowledge. Internal decoration is elaborate, and includes exposed carved and gilded timber supports, and furnishings such as silks, embroideries, lanterns and lamps.

In the 1965–1966 restoration, the middle roof section, which had been removed, was repositioned. Much of the original interior decoration, which had been either salvaged or vandalised, was replaced.

The temple survives in a back street sandwiched between the Breakfast Creek Hotel, Albion Park Racecourse and light industrial development, with the former vista across Breakfast Creek lost. A plain concrete block building has been constructed adjacent to the temple, and the grounds have been concreted and enclosed with a brick fence and gateway.

== Heritage listing ==
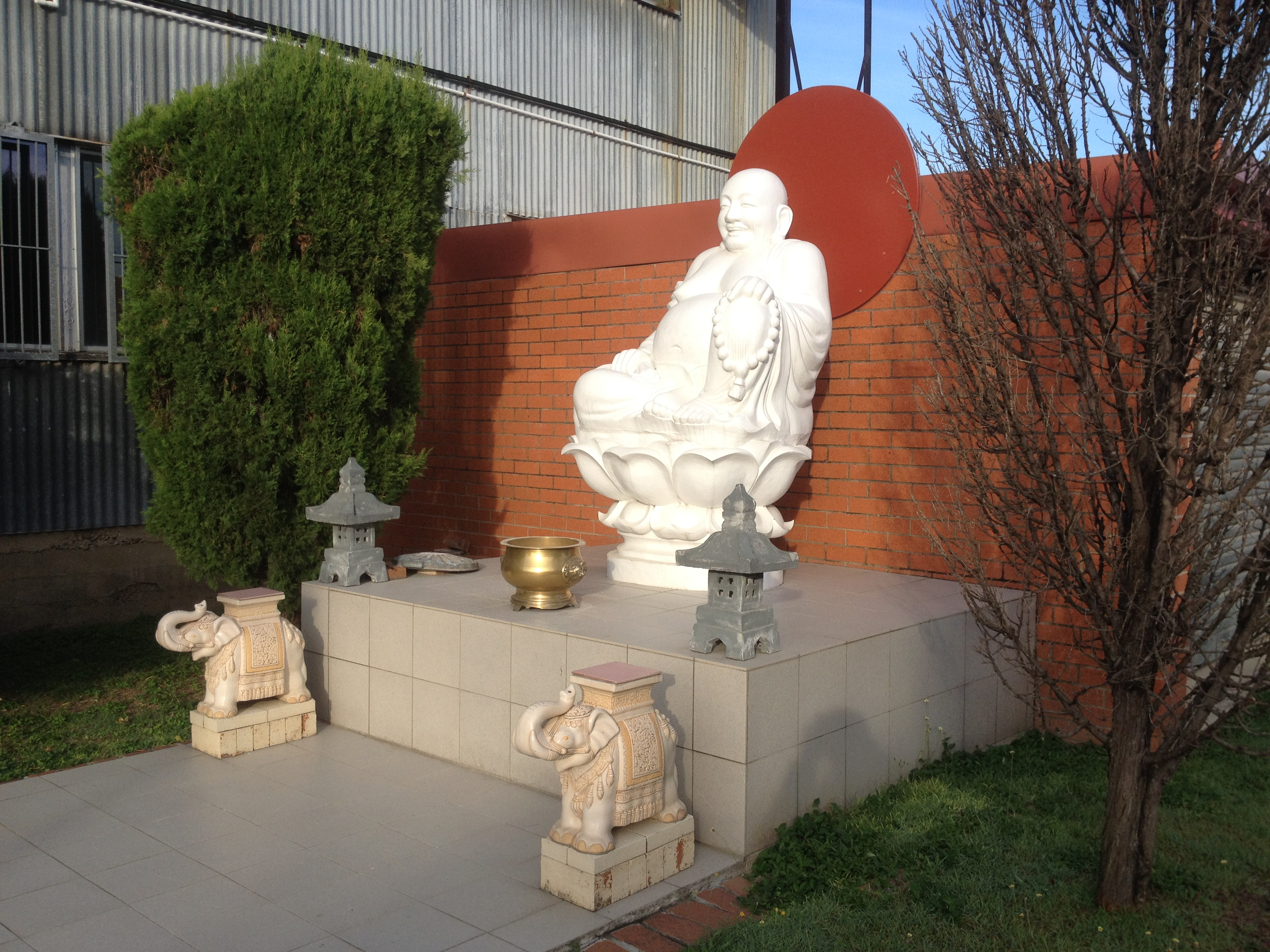
Garden, 2014

The Holy Triad Temple was listed on the Queensland Heritage Register on 21 October 1992 having satisfied the following criteria.

The place is important in demonstrating the evolution or pattern of Queensland's history.

The Temple of the Holy Triad is significant as evidence of the development of Chinese settlement in nineteenth century Brisbane.

The place demonstrates rare, uncommon or endangered aspects of Queensland's cultural heritage.

The Temple of the Holy Triad is significant as a rare example of a nineteenth century Chinese temple in Queensland.

The place is important in demonstrating the principal characteristics of a particular class of cultural places.

The Temple of the Holy Triad is significant as a rare example of a nineteenth century Chinese temple in Queensland.
