= Al-Hashimi =

Al-Hashimi, also transliterated Al-Hashemi (Arabic: الهاشمي), Hashemi, Hashimi, or Hashmi (Persian: هاشمی) is an Arabic and Persian surname. The definite article Al- usually distinguishes the Arabic from the more numerous form.

It is the pronoun form of Hashim (Arabic: هاشم) and originally designated a member or descendant of the Banu Hashim clan of the Quraysh tribe. The Islamic prophet, Muhammad was a member of this Arab tribe; his great-grandfather was Hashim ibn Abd Manaf, for whom the clan is named. Members of this clan are referred to as Hashimids, Hashemites, Hashimis or Hashmis. This refers in particular to:

- the Sharifs of Mecca, the rulers of Mecca from the 10th century until 1924. As descendants of Hasan ibn Ali, they belonged to the Bani Hashim.
- the Hashemite royal family of Hejaz (1916–1925), Iraq (1921–1958), and Jordan (1921–present). As descendants of Sharif Hussein ibn Ali, they belong to the Dhawu Awn, a branch of the Sharifs of Mecca, and therefore also of the Bani Hashim.

== List ==
Notable people with this family name include:

- 'Abd al-Ilah (died 1958), Regent of Iraq
- 'Abd al-Rahim ibn Ja'far ibn Sulayman al-Hashimi (died c. 844), Abbasid personage and governor of the Yemen
- Abdullah Hashmi'ties I of Jordan, king of Jordan
- Abdullah Hashmi II, king of Jordan, kings of Jordan 1999- present
- Abdullah Al-Hashimi, Bruneian royal
- Abdul Razak al-Hashimi, former Iraqi diplomat
- Alaa Al Hashimi (born 1953), Iraqi politician
- Ali bin Hussein al-Hashimi (1879–1935), King of Hejaz
- Ali Hashemi (born 1991), Iranian weightlifter
- Ali ibn Sulayman al-Hashimi (ninth century), Muslim scholar
- Amir Hashemi (born 1966), former Iranian football player
- Amir-Hossein Ghazizadeh Hashemi (born 1971), Iranian politician
- Aqila al-Hashimi (1953–2003), Iraqi politician
- Asad al-Hashemi, Iraqi politician
- Bagher Hashemi (born 1994), Iranian footballer
- Bashir Al-Hashimi (born 1961), British academic
- Bobby Hashemi (born 1991), British entrepreneur
- Cyrus Hashemi (1942–1986), Iranian arms dealer
- Ehsan Ghazizadeh Hashemi (born 1976), Iranian politician
- Emraan Hashmi (born 1979), Indian film actor
- Fahad Hashmi (born 1989), Pakistani artist, actor and broadcaster
- Farhat Hashmi a Pakistani Canadian Islamic scholar
- Farideh Hashemi (born 1939), Iranian politician
- Farshad Hashemi (born 1997), Iranian footballer
- Fatemeh Hashemi (born 1969), Iranian television actress
- Fawaz al-Hashimi (died 2004), member of Al-Qaeda in the Arabian Peninsula
- Faisal I of Iraq (died 1933), Hashemite King of Syria and Iraq
- Faisal II of Iraq (died 1958), last Hashemite King of Iraq
- Ghazala Hashmi (born 1964), American politician from Virginia
- Gita Hashemi (born 1961), Iranian-born Canadian artist, writer and curator
- Harun ibn Muhammad ibn Ishaq al-Hashimi (died 901), Abbasid personage and governor of Mecca, Medina and al-Ta'if
- Hashim Al-Hashimi, American biochemist
- Hassan Ghazizadeh Hashemi (born 1959), Iranian ophthalmologist
- Hisham al-Hashimi (1973–2020), Iraqi researcher
- Hossein Hashemi (born 1953), Iranian politician
- Hussein bin Ali, Sharif of Mecca (Hashemites), Ottoman Empire, King of Hejaz, King of the Arab Countries
- Ibn Sa'd Hashmi, (Katib al-Waqidi), was a scholar and Arabian biographer, Book (Book of the Major Classes)
- Ishaaq bin Ahmed bin Muhammad al-Hashimi, scholar and patriarch of the Somali Isaaq clan-family
- Ishaq ibn al-Abbas ibn Muhammad al-Hashimi (ninth century), Abbasid personage and governor of the Yemen
- Jamshid Hashemi (1936–2013), Iranian arms dealer
- Jassem Al-Hashemi (born 1996), Qatari footballer
- Javad Hashemi (born 1966), Iranian actor, film director, writer and composer
- Kioumars Hashemi, Iranian sports executive
- Kinza Hashmi, Pakistani actress
- Manouchehr Hashemi (1918–2007), SAVAK intelligence agency officer
- Maryam Hashemi (born 1977), Iranian visual artist
- Marzieh Hashemi (born 1959), American-born Iranian journalist and television presenter
- Maysoon al-Hashemi (1946–2006), Iraqi politician
- Mehdi Hashemi (1946–1987), Iranian Shi'a cleric
- Mehdi Hashemi (actor) (born 1946), Iranian actor, screenwriter, and director
- Mirhani Hashemi (born 1983), Iranian footballer
- Mohamed Al-Hashimi (born 1965), Omani sprinter
- Mohsen Al-Hashemi (born 1990), Emirati footballer
- Mojtaba Samareh Hashemi, Iranian politician
- Muhammad al-Hashimi al-Tilimsani (1881–1961), Algerian (by birth) and Syrian (by residence) Sufi saint and scholar
- Muhammad Yusuf Hashmi, Reformer and Leader of the Pakistan Movement, who achieved high distinction in English studies in British India
- Nadia Hashimi (born 1977), Afghan-American pediatric physician, novelist, and politician
- Sayed Rahman Hashemi, Afghan politician
- Reem Al Hashimy, Emirati politician
- Sahar Hashemi, British entrepreneur
- Sajjad Hashemi (born 1991), Iranian sprint athlete
- Saud al-Hashimi (born 1963), Saudi Arabian human rights activist
- Sayed Abdul Karim Hashimi, Afghan politician
- Sayed Maqsood Hashemi (born 1984), Afghan footballer
- Sayed Mohammad Hashemi (born 1994), Afghan footballer
- Sayed Rahmatullah Hashemi (born 1978), Afghan diplomat
- Sayed Zafar Hashemi (born 1985), Afghan politician
- Seyed Zia Hashemi (born 1968), Iranian politician
- Seyyed Mehdi Hashemi (born 1964), Iranian politician
- Shakiba Hashemi, Afghani politician
- Shamim Hashimi (born 1947), Urdu and Persian poet
- Taha al-Hashimi (1888–1961), Iraqi politician
- Talal Hashmi, kings of Jordan
- Tariq al-Hashemi (born 1942), Iraqi politician
- Wijdan Ali Al-Hashemi (born 1939), Jordanian artist, educator and diplomat
- Wissam S. al-Hashimi (died 2004), Iraqi geologist
- Yasin al-Hashimi (1884–1937), Iraqi politician
- Zakaria Hashemi (born 1936), Iranian actor and film director
- Zarina Hashmi (1937–2020), Indian-American artist

== See also ==
- Banu Hashim, the clan in the Quraysh tribe, to which the surname refers to
- Hashemites (disambiguation)
- Hashem, given name and surname
- Hashim, male Arabic given name
- Al Hashemi, United Arab Emirates-based architectural firm
- Sayyid, Sharif, Ashraf, honorific titles denoting descendants of the Ahl al-Bayt, the family of the Islamic prophet Muhammad
