= Farida (given name) =

Farida is one of the common female names throughout West Asian culture. In Turkish it is spelled as Feride. In Persian, the name is rendered as Farideh (Persian: فریده) in the Iranian dialect, but Farida (Фарида) in the Afghan and Tajik dialects.

== People ==
- Fareeda Kokikhel Afridi (died 2012), Pakistani women's rights activist
- Farida (830-?), a 9th-century Arabic musician and wife of al-Mutawakkīl.
- Farida of Egypt (1921–1988), Queen of Egypt
- Farida Abiyeva (born 1995), Azerbaijani karateka
- Farida al-Abani (born 1988), Swedish politician
- Farida Ahmadi (born 1957), Afghan author and women's rights activist
- Farida Amrani (born 1976), Moroccan-born French trade unionist and politician
- Farida Anwar (born 1946), British politician
- Farida Arriany (1938–1977), Indonesian actress, model, and singer
- Farida Azam (1937–1992), Pakistani politician's wife
- Farida Azizi, Afghan women's rights activist
- Farida Azizova (born 1995), Azerbaijani taekwondo practitioner
- Farida Arouche (born 1980), Algerian chess player
- Farida El Askalany (born 1995), Egyptian volleyball player
- Farida Akhtar Babita (born 1953), Bangladeshi film actress
- Farida Bahnas (born 2010), Egyptian rhythmic gymnast
- Farida Bedwei (born 1979), Ghanaian software engineer
- Farida Belghoul (born 1958), French-Algerian author
- Farida Benlyazid (born 1948), Moroccan scriptwriter, producer, novelist, and director
- Farida Benyahia, Algerian politician
- Farida Bourquia (born 1948), Moroccan film director
- Farida Dadi (born 1950), Indian actress
- Farida Diouri (1953–2004), Moroccan novelist
- Farida Haddouche (born 1959), Algerian politician
- Farida Hossain (born 1945), Bangladeshi writer, playwright, editor, director, and translator
- Farida Hussein (born 2006), Egyptian rhythmic gymnast
- Maria Farida Indrati, referred to as Farida (born 1949), Indonesian judge
- Farida Fassi, Moroccan physicist
- Farida Jalal (born 1949), Indian actress
- Farida Kant, Italian drag queen
- Farida Karodia (born 1942), South African novelist and short-story writer
- Farida Khalaf (born 1995), pen name of a Yazidi woman who was abducted by ISIS
- Farida Khalil (born 2011), Egyptian modern pentathlete
- Farida Khanum (born 1935), Pakistani Ghazal singer from Punjab
- Farida Khanam (scholar) (born 1952), Indian Islamic scholar
- Farida Khelfa (born 1960), French documentary filmmaker and former model
- Farida Kuchi (born 1964), Afghan politician
- Farida Kyakutema (born 1962), Ugandan sprinter
- Farida Majid (1942–2021), Bangladeshi poet, translator, and academic
- Farida Mammadova (1936–2021), Azerbaijani historian
- Farida Mansurova (1952–2021), Tajikistani physician and scientific researcher
- Farida Mohamed (born 2002), Egyptian professional squash player
- Farida Mohammad Ali (born 1963), Iraqi singer
- Farida Momand (born 1965), Afghan doctor and politician
- Farida Nabourema (born 1990), Togolese human rights activist and writer
- Farida Nekzad (born 1976), Afghan journalist
- Farida Osman (born 1995), Egyptian-American swimmer
- Farida Parveen (1954–2025), Bangladeshi singer
- Farida Rahmeh (born 1953), Lebanese alpine skier
- Farida Rustamova (born 1992), Russian journalist
- Farida Shaheed, Pakistani sociologist and feminist human rights activist
- Farida El-Sherif (born 1998), Egyptian basketball player
- Farida Siddiqui (1937–2013), Pakistani religious scholar and politician
- Farida Waller (born 1993), Thai actress and model
- Farida Waziri (born 1946), Nigerian technocrat, law enforcement officer
- Farida A. Wiley (1889–1986), American naturalist, ornithologist and educator
- Farida Yahya, Nigerian entrepreneur and author
- Farida Yasmin (born 1963), Bangladeshi journalist
- Farida Yasmin (1940–2015), Bangladesh singer
- Farida Zaman (born 1953), Bangladeshi artist and illustrator
- Farideh Ghotbi (1920–2000), Iranian public figure
- Farideh Hashemi (born 1939), Iranian politician
- Farideh Heyat (born 1949), British-Iranian anthropologist
- Farideh Lashai (1944–2013), Iranian painter
- Farideh Moradkhani (born 1971), Iranian engineer, human rights activist
- Farideh Hashemi (born 1939), Iranian politician

== See also ==
- for articles on persons with this first name
