= Aimal =

Aimal is a given name originating in Pashto meaning friend. Notable people with the name include:

- Aimal Faizi, Afghan journalist and columnist
- Aimal Wali Khan, Pakistani nationalist politician
- Mir Aimal Kansi, Pakistani convicted shooter
