= Withdrawal of United States troops from Afghanistan (2011–2016) =

Withdrawal of the United States troops from Afghanistan
- Part of the War in Afghanistan (2001–2021), the Taliban Insurgency, and the war on terror
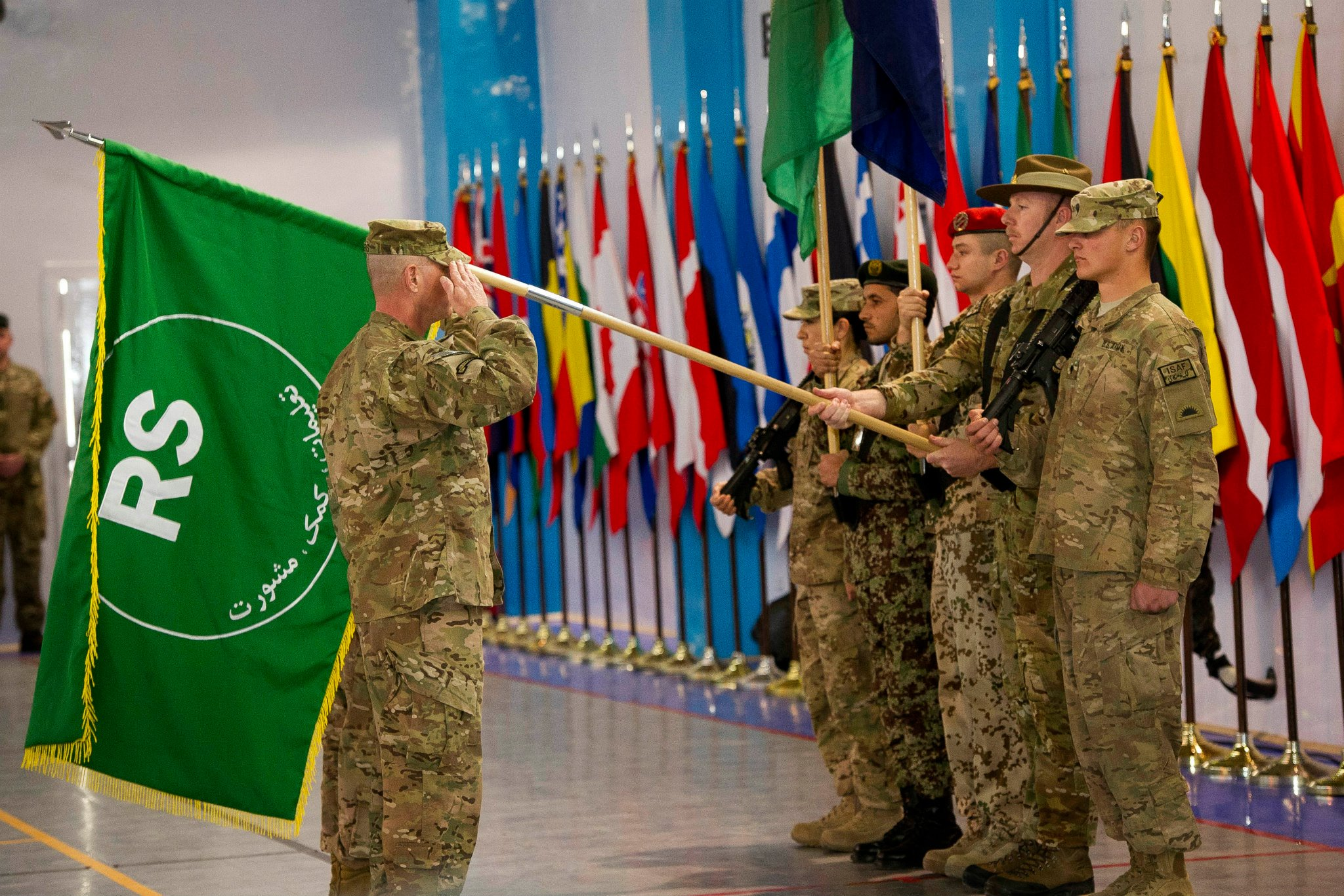
- Change of Mission Ceremony from ISAF to Resolute Support, Dec. 28, 2014, in Kabul.
Date	22 June 2011 – 31 December 2016 (5 years, 6 months, 1 week and 2 days)
Location	Afghanistan
Result	Withdrawal completed in December 2016: Larger United States military presence than originally planned

Belligerents
Coalition: United States (U.S. Armed Forces); Australia (Australian Defence Force); Islamic Republic of Afghanistan (Afghan Armed Forces); International Security Assistance Force; Resolute Support Mission	Insurgent groups: Taliban; Al-Qaeda; Al-Qaeda in the Indian Subcontinent; Haqqani network; Pakistani Taliban; Islamic Movement of Uzbekistan; Jamaat Ansarullah; Harkat-ul-Jihad-al-Islami; Hezb-e-Islami Gulbuddin; Hezb-e Islami Khalis; Lashkar-e-Taiba; Lashkar-e-Islam; Abdullah Azzam Shaheed Brigade; Jaish-e-Mohammed; Turkistan Islamic Party; Islamic Emirate of Waziristan; Sipah-e-Sahaba Pakistan; Tehreek-e-Nafaz-e-Shariat-e-Mohammadi; Islamic Jihad Union; Lashkar-e-Jhangvi; Harkat-ul-Mujahideen; Mullah Dadullah Front

Commanders and leaders
(United States) Barack Obama (United States) Joseph F. Dunford, Jr. (United States) John O. Brennan (United States) James B. Cunningham	Various

The withdrawal of United States troops from Afghanistan describes the drawdown of United States Armed Forces in the Afghanistan war and the plans after its post-2014 presence when most combat troops had left Afghanistan at the end of 2014.

NATO had planned on maintaining 13,000 troops including 9,800 Americans in an advisory and counter-terrorism capacity in Afghanistan during the 2015 phase of the War in Afghanistan and they were expected to maintain a presence inside Afghanistan until well after the end of 2016. In July 2016, in light of the deteriorating security conditions, the US postponed the withdrawal until December 2016 and decided to maintain a force of 8,400 troops in 4 garrisons (Kabul, Kandahar, Bagram and Jalalabad) indefinitely due to Taliban resurgence attempt after the Battle of Kunduz. The withdrawal was completed in December 2016 leaving behind 8,400 troops.

== Background ==
=== 2009 U.S. troops increase under the Obama Administration ===
Troop levels remained roughly constant under U.S. president Barack Obama's predecessor, former president George W. Bush, with around 30,000 American troops deployed in Afghanistan. In January, about 3,000 U.S. soldiers from the 3rd Brigade Combat Team of the 10th Mountain Division moved into the provinces of Logar and Wardak. The troops were the first wave of an expected surge of reinforcements originally ordered by George W. Bush and increased by Barack Obama.

On 17 February 2009, Barack Obama ordered 17,000 more US troops be sent to Afghanistan to bolster security in the country and thereby boosted the 36,000 US troops already there by 50%. "This increase is necessary to stabilize a deteriorating situation in Afghanistan, which has not received the strategic attention, direction and resources it urgently requires," Obama said in a written statement. "The Taliban is resurgent in Afghanistan, and Al-Qaeda supports the insurgency and threatens America from its safe haven along the Pakistani border," Obama also said. He recognised "the extraordinary strain this deployment places on our troops and military families", but the deteriorating security situation in the region required "urgent attention and swift action". The new troop deployment was expected to include 8,000 U.S. Marines from Camp Lejeune, North Carolina, 4,000 U.S. Army troops from Fort Lewis, Washington and another 5,000 troops from an unspecified branch of the U.S. Armed Forces. Obama also said he was "absolutely convinced that you cannot solve the problem of Afghanistan, the Taliban, the spread of extremism in that region solely through military means."

A further decision on sending more troops came after the administration completed a broader review of Afghanistan policy. On 27 March 2009, Obama announced after an intense 60-day White House policy review, in which military commanders and diplomats, regional governments, partners, NATO allies, NGOs and aid organisations were consulted, a new strategy for Afghanistan and Pakistan. "So I want the American people to understand that we have a clear and focused goal: to disrupt, dismantle, and defeat al-Qaida in Pakistan and Afghanistan, and to prevent their return to either country in the future. That is the goal that must be achieved. That is a cause that could not be more just. And to the terrorists who oppose us, my message is the same: we will defeat you," Obama said. For this purpose Obama announced that he plans to further bolster American forces in Afghanistan, increase aid to Pakistan, and set strict standards – like levels of violence and casualties in Afghanistan, Pakistani attacks against insurgents and accounting for U.S. aid – for measuring progress in fighting Al Qaeda and the Taliban in both countries. Part of his strategy was the deployment of 4,000 U.S. troops – beyond the additional 17,000 he authorized in February—to work as trainers and advisers to the Afghan army and police. The move was accompanied by a "surge" in US civilians to Afghanistan to help rebuild the country's infrastructure. In addition to the renewed focus on Afghanistan, the Obama administration was to step up pressure on Pakistan to tackle the al-Qaida and Taliban safe havens in the tribal areas along its border with Afghanistan. US military and civilian aid was to be increased. The last element of the policy was to try to engage Afghanistan's regional neighbours, including Russia and Iran, in helping to pacify Afghanistan.

"There is no imminent threat of the government being overthrown, but the Taliban has gained momentum," Obama said with respect to the 2009 situation in Afghanistan. "Al Qaeda has not reemerged in Afghanistan in the same numbers as before 9/11, but they retain their safe-havens along the border. And our forces lack the full support they need to effectively train and partner with Afghan Security Forces and better secure the population." On 1 December 2009, Obama therefore announced at The United States Military Academy in West Point that the U.S. will be sending 30,000 more troops to Afghanistan and set July 2011 as the date to begin pulling U.S. forces out of the country. Promising that he could "bring this war to a successful conclusion," Obama set out a strategy that would seek to reverse Taliban gains in large parts of Afghanistan, better protect the Afghan people, increase the pressure on Afghanistan to build its own military capacity and a more effective government and step up attacks on Al Qaeda in Pakistan. The president said the three core elements to the new strategy are "a military effort to create the conditions for a transition; a civilian surge that reinforces positive action; and an effective partnership with Pakistan." The overarching goal was to "disrupt, dismantle, and defeat al Qaeda in Afghanistan and Pakistan, and to prevent its capacity to threaten America and our allies in the future." The West Point Speech concluded a three-month review of war strategy. During the review, Obama asked for province-by-province assessments of the Taliban's strength, the effectiveness of provincial Afghan leaders and the overall security outlook to determine how quickly U.S. forces could leave certain regions. In the months leading up to his West Point speech, more precisely at a meeting with the Joint Chiefs of Staff on 30 October 2009 to discuss his troops surge plan, Obama stated that the Afghanistan War is an American war, but he doesn't want to it make an open-ended commitment. Obama also was livid that details of the 3 month Afghanistan War Review discussions were leaking out according to The New York Times. "What I'm not going to tolerate is you talking to the press outside of this room," he scolded his advisers. "It's a disservice to the process, to the country and to the men and women of the military." In addition to the 30,000 additional U.S. troops that Obama announced to deploy to Afghanistan Obama sent an additional 22,000 forces (which were earlier announced in 2009 (compare section above)) along with 11,000 troops that were authorized by his predecessor to Afghanistan.

=== 2010 London Conference on Afghanistan and 2010 Afghanistan War Review ===
During the London Conference on Afghanistan Afghanistan announced on 28 January 2010 its intention of taking charge of the "majority of operations in the insecure areas of Afghanistan within three years and taking responsibility for physical security within five years". This combined with the increase of Afghan military strength to 171,600 and police numbers to 134,000 by October 2011 would enable the United States could begin to transition U.S. troops out of Afghanistan in July 2011 according to US Secretary of State Hillary Clinton. "It's not an exit strategy, it's about assisting the Afghans" in taking responsibility for their own security, she explained.

Declaring significant progress in disrupting al-Qaeda and combatting the Taliban, Obama said on 16 December 2010 that the United States will start withdrawing U.S. troops from Afghanistan in July 2011. Obama said "we are on track to achieve our goals" in the Afghan war and to "start reducing our forces next July." He added the drawdown will "conclude in 2014." Obama appeared before reporters to announce the results of the Afghanistan war review, which was compiled from reports submitted by military, diplomatic and intelligence officials since mid-October 2010. The president had directed his national security staff to perform a "diagnostic" assessment of the December 2009 West point strategy after one year. They convened eight working-group and deputy-level meetings from 16 Nov through 1 Dec.. An interagency team also visited Afghanistan and Pakistan from 25 October through 4 November to discuss the situation with key leaders first-hand. The summary document of the review included no specifics as to the potential size or pace of withdrawal, making no assessment as to whether any milestones have been reached and leaving substantial wiggle room for future decisions. "As a result of our integrated efforts in 2010," the report said, "we are setting the conditions to begin transition to Afghan security lead in early 2011 and to begin a responsible, conditions-based U.S. troop reduction in July 2011." The review concluded that the military surge of 30,000 troops has been a success, saying it "reduced overall Taliban influence and arrested the momentum they had achieved in recent years in key parts of the country." It added, however, that successes remain "fragile and reversible."

=== 2011 drawdown speech ===
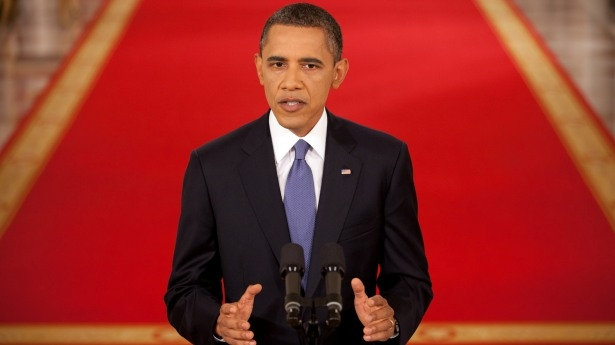
U.S. President Barack Obama announcing a drawdown of U.S. troops from Afghanistan on 22 June 2011

On 22 June 2011, Obama addressed the nation from the White House and announced that 10,000 troops would be withdrawn by the end of 2011 and an additional 23,000 troops will leave the country by the summer of 2012. He said the drawdown would continue "at a steady pace" until the United States handed over security to the Afghan authorities in 2014. "We are starting this drawdown from a position of strength," Obama said. "Al Qaeda is under more pressure than at any time since 9/11." Asserting that the country that served as a base for 11 September 2001 attacks no longer represented a terrorist threat to the United States, Obama declared that the "tide of war is receding." The announced drawdown will leave approximately 68,000 U.S. troops in Afghanistan by the autumn of 2012 according to The Huffington Post, but Gen. John R. Allen, commander of the International Security Assistance Force (ISAF), said that 23,000 of the 88,000 U.S. troops currently in Afghanistan will be home by 30 September 2012 and thus 65,000 U.S. troops will remain in Afghanistan after the so-called Phase 2 drawdown.

== 2011–2012: Initial drawdown plans ==
The U.S. drawdown in Afghanistan began 13 July 2011 when the first 650 U.S. troops left Afghanistan as part of Obama's planned drawdown. The units that left were two Army National Guard cavalry squadrons: the 1st Squadron, 134th Cavalry Regiment, based in Kabul, and the 1st Squadron, 113th Cavalry Regiment, which had been in neighboring Parwan province.

The United States and its NATO allies finalized agreements on 18 April 2012 to wind down the war in Afghanistan by formalizing three commitments: to move the Afghans gradually into a lead combat role; to keep some international troops in Afghanistan beyond 2014, and to pay billions of dollars a year to help support the Afghan security forces.

On 2 May 2012, Afghan president Hamid Karzai and U.S. president Barack Obama signed a strategic partnership agreement between the two countries, after the U.S. president had arrived in Kabul as part of unannounced trip to Afghanistan on the first anniversary of Osama bin Laden's death. The U.S.–Afghanistan Strategic Partnership Agreement, officially titled the "Enduring Strategic Partnership Agreement between the Islamic Republic of Afghanistan and the United States of America", provides the long-term framework for the relationship between Afghanistan and the United States of America after the drawdown of U.S. forces in the Afghanistan war. The agreement went into effect on 4 July 2012.

After the signing of the strategic partnership agreement Obama laid out his plans to end the war in Afghanistan responsibly. The plans call for 1) the removal of 23,000 US troops at the summer end of 2012, i.e. at the end of September 2012; 2) Afghan security forces to take the lead in combat operations by the end of 2013 while ISAF forces train, advise and assist the Afghans and fight alongside them when needed; and 3) the complete removal of all U.S. troops by the end of 2014, except for trainers who will assist Afghan forces and a small contingent of troops with a specific mission to combat al-Qaeda through counterterrorism operations.

=== NATO Chicago Summit: Troops withdrawal and longterm presence ===
On 21 May 2012 the leaders of the NATO-member countries endorsed an exit strategy during the 2012 NATO Summit in Chicago. The NATO-led ISAF Forces will hand over command of all combat missions to Afghan forces by the middle of 2013, while shifting at the same time from combat to a support role of advising, training and assisting the Afghan security forces and then withdraw most of the 130,000 foreign troops by the end of December 2014. A new and different NATO mission will then advise, train and assist the Afghan security forces including the Afghan Special Operations Forces.

=== Tokyo Conference on Afghanistan ===
The Tokyo Conference on Afghanistan, held on 8 July 2012 was the civilian-diplomatic bookend to NATO's 2012 May summit in Chicago, where the alliance confirmed plans to withdraw foreign combat troops by the end of 2014 and pledged about $4 billion a year to pay for ongoing training, equipment and financial support for Afghanistan's security forces. In exchange for pledges from the Afghan government to combat corruption, $16 billion over the next four years for civilian projects such as roads to schools or projects aimed to strengthen the rule of law were pledged by the some 70 nations attending the conference. The reconstruction and development aid was pledged for the timeframe through 2015, but under the condition that the Afghan government reduce corruption before receiving all of the money. In the so-called Tokyo Framework of Mutual Accountability foreign governments will assure Afghanistan a steady stream of financing in exchange for stronger anticorruption measures and the establishment of the rule of law. Up to 20 percent of the money would depend on the government meeting governance standards according to the Tokyo Framework of Mutual Accountability.

"We will fight corruption with strong resolve wherever it occurs, and ask the same of our international partners," Karzai told the donors. "Together we must stop the practices that feed corruption or undermine the legitimacy and effectiveness of national institutions." The international aid is tied to a mechanism that will regularly review how it is being spent, and to guarantees from Kabul that it will seriously take on its deep-rooted corruption problems – what the conference called a roadmap of accountability. Kabul must also demonstrate efforts to improve governance and finance management, and safeguard the democratic process, rule of law and human rights – especially those of women. US Secretary of State Hillary Clinton stressed the need for reform to safeguard changes achieved in Afghanistan. "That must include fighting corruption, improving governance, strengthening the rule of law, increasing access to economic opportunity for all Afghans, especially for women," she said. A follow-up conference will be held in Britain in 2014. The meeting in Britain in 2014 will check progress toward "mutual accountability" and a review and monitoring process to assure that development aid is not diverted by corrupt officials or mismanaged – both of which have been major hurdles in putting aid projects into practice thus far.

=== Security handover and U.S. Suspension of Afghan Local Police forces training ===
The U.S. was set to hand over responsibility for security to local Afghans by 2014, and efforts were underway to draw down U.S. forces, but Obama never specified a date for the withdrawal of all American troops from the country. Obama said on 1 September 2012 that he had a "specific plan to bring our troops home from Afghanistan by the end of 2014." On 2 September 2012 White House press secretary Jay Carney then clarified Obama's statement by saying that Obama had "never said that all the troops would be out." Carney noted while the United States would transfer security to Afghan troops by the end of 2014, all U.S. troops would not be out of the country by that date. "Everyone understands what the president's policy is, which is a full transition to Afghan security lead by 2014," said Carney. "We have been abundantly clear about the stages of the implementation of that policy. And as in Iraq, that means that while not all U.S. troops will have withdrawn necessarily by then, the Afghan Security Forces will be in full security transition, I mean, will be in full security lead, and U.S. forces will continue to be drawn down."

=== "Green-on-blue" attacks hampering handover ===
The effort to handover security to Afghans has been hampered by a spike in attacks by local forces supposed to be working with American and NATO personnel. United States military officials suspended temporarily on 2 September 2012 the training of Afghan Local Police (ALP) in the wake of a deadly series of so-called 'green on blue' attacks by Afghan soldiers and police on their international allies. The training has been put on hold in order to carry out intensified vetting procedures on new recruits, and 16,000 existing ALP recruits will be re-vetted. ALP training is a U.S. mission, carried out by Special Forces teams who work with Afghan elders and government officials in remote villages to help villagers defend themselves against insurgent attacks and intimidation. Training of uniformed police and army personnel is done under the banner of the NATO operation. The suspension affects not only Afghan Local Police, but also Afghan special operations and commando forces. Special Operations officials said that they anticipate it will take about two months to rescreen all of the Afghan forces and that the training of new recruits could stall for as long as a month.

The Washington Post reported many 'green on blue' attacks might have been prevented if existing security measures had been applied correctly, but according to NATO officials numerous military guidelines were not followed – by Afghans or Americans – because of concerns that they might slow the growth of the Afghan army and police. Despite that the current process for vetting recruits is effective, a lack of follow-up has allowed Afghan troops who fell under the sway of the insurgency or grew disillusioned with the Afghan government to remain in the force. In other instances the vetting process for Afghan soldiers and police was never properly implemented. NATO officials knew it, according to The Washington Post, but they looked the other way, worried that extensive background checks could hinder the recruitment process. Also ignored were requirements that Afghans display proper credentials while on base. Many Afghans, even those who were vetted, were never issued official badges, making it impossible to tell who was supposed to have access to any particular facility. Measures specifically designed to curtail attacks (American and NATO service members should for example always carry a loaded magazine in their weapons to save precious moments if attacked by Afghan forces) were also inconsistently applied. The "Guardian Angel" program (The program calls for one or two soldiers to monitor the Afghans during every mission or meeting. These soldiers, "angels" called and whose identities are not disclosed to the Afghans, must be prepared to fire on anyone who tries to kill a coalition service member.) was often seen as a distraction from NATO's mission. Calls to minimize off-duty time spent with Afghan troops were similarly thought by NATO officials to undermine the goal of relationship-building, but according to a directive from NATO leaders troops are now being advised to stay away from Afghan soldiers and police officers during vulnerable moments, such as when they are sleeping, bathing or exercising. Additional security measures include improved training for counterintelligence agents, a more intense vetting system for new recruits, establishing an anonymous reporting system for soldiers to report suspicious activity; increasing the presence of Afghan counterintelligence teams among Afghan troops; banning the sale of Afghan army and police uniforms to help stop infiltrators posing as soldiers and policemen; and revetting soldiers when they return home from leave.

The Afghan army has detained or sacked hundreds of soldiers for having links to insurgents, the Defence Ministry said on 5 September 2012 as it tried to stem the rising number of so-called insider attacks. "Hundreds were sacked or detained after showing links with insurgents. In some cases we had evidence against them, in others we were simply suspicious," Defence Ministry spokesman Zahir Azimi told reporters in Kabul. "Using an army uniform against foreign forces is a serious point of concern not only for the Defence Ministry but for the whole Afghan government," Azimi said, adding that Karzai had ordered Afghan forces to devise ways to stop insider attacks. Azimi declined to say whether the detained and fired soldiers were from Taliban strongholds in the south and east, saying they were from all over the country. He said his ministry started an investigation into the attacks, called green-on-blue attacks, within the 195,000-strong Afghan army six months ago.

On 18 September 2012 General John Allen suspended all joint combat operations between Afghanistan and American ground units in Afghanistan. Under orders from the General interaction between coalition and Afghan forces would take place only at the battalion level. Allen made the move, along with suspending American-led Afghan training missions, due to growing concern over "insider attacks" against U.S. troops by members of the Afghan National Security Forces. Less than a week after the order U.S. and NATO combat troops resumed joint operations with Afghan forces.

== 2012–2014: Security handover and Bilateral Security Agreement ==
=== 2012 drawdown ===
The 2012 pullout of 23,000 American troops from Afghanistan was on 22 July 2012 at the halfway mark according to U.S. Gen. John Allen, the top commander of U.S. and NATO forces in Afghanistan and would accelerate in the coming months. "August will be the heaviest month," Allen said. "A lot is coming out now and a great deal will come out in August and early September. We'll be done probably around mid-September or so." Up to one half of the 23,000 troops being pulled out 2012 are combat forces, he said. Small numbers are being pulled from the relatively stable northern and western parts of the country. Some will be withdrawn from the east and the south "and a good bit in the southwest," he said. U.S. Defense Secretary Leon Panetta announced on 21 September 2012 that the 33,000 additional U.S. troops that Obama had sent to Afghanistan in 2010 to counter the Taliban attacks have left the country. A phased withdrawal plan was developed where 10,000 troops would leave Afghanistan by July 2011 and the remaining 23,000 would leave Afghanistan by the end of September 2012. The removal of the 23,000 U.S. troops began in July 2012. In a statement announcing an end to the surge Panetta stated:

As we reflect on this moment, it is an opportunity to recognize that the surge accomplished its objectives of reversing Taliban momentum on the battlefield, and dramatically increased the size and capability of the Afghan National Security Forces (ANSF). This growth has allowed us and our ISAF Coalition partners to begin the process of transition to Afghan security lead, which will soon extend across every province and more than 75 percent of the Afghan population. At the same time, we have struck enormous blows against al Qaeda's leadership, consistent with our core goal of disrupting, dismantling and defeating al Qaeda and denying it a safe-haven.

Once the United States and its allies agreed on the timing for the shift in the Afghanistan mission – under which American troops would step away from the lead combat role to a supporting mission focused primarily on counterterrorism and training Afghan security forces (according to the 2012 NATO Chicago Summit this shift is planned for the middle of 2013 (see section above) – the Obama administration must decide exactly when the remaining 68,000 troops will come home, according to The New York Times. In September 2012 the United States withdrew then the last of the 33,000 "surge" forces from Afghanistan that Obama ordered in West Point 2009 to try to bring the Afghanistan war under control. With the reduction over the next two years of the remaining 68,000 American troops, the top American and NATO commander in Afghanistan would lead a force that is to operate from fewer bases and will train Afghan forces to take the lead in combat.

=== 2013 drawdown ===
The amount of U.S. troops to remain in Afghanistan during 2013 was still being decided as of March 2012, but it appeared that three options were considered. These three options were:

1. A drawdown from 68,000 to 58,000 troops by the end of 2012, with a further drawdown to between 38,000 and 48,000 by June 2013. This would be a continuation of the current policy of gradual drawdown. Obama has stated that he prefers a gradual drawdown.
2. Maintaining 68,000 troops through the end of 2013. This is the US military commanders' preferred option since it maintains US force levels through the summer fighting season in 2013.
3. A large and rapid drawdown, perhaps to 20,000 troops, by the end of 2013. This would leave only Special Operations Forces, counterterrorism forces, military trainers, and some support and security staff in Afghanistan. This is Vice President Biden's preferred option.

According to two U.S. officials who were involved in Afghan issues said that the senior U.S. commander in Afghanistan, General John R. Allen, wanted to keep a significant military capability through the fighting season ending in fall 2013, which could translate to a force of more than 60,000 troops until the end of that period. The United States has not "begun considering any specific recommendations for troop numbers in 2013 and 2014," said George Little, the Pentagon spokesman. "What is true is that in June 2011 the president made clear that our forces would continue to come home at a steady pace as we transition to an Afghan lead for security. That it still the case."

During the 2013 State of the Union Address, Obama said that the U.S. military would reduce the troop level in Afghanistan from 68,000 to 34,000 troops by February 2014. According to an unnamed U.S. official, Obama made his decision "based on the recommendations of the military and his national security team," consultations with Karzai, and "international coalition partners."

The U.S. adopted a withdrawal schedule which U.S. General John Allen called a "phased approach." According to the new withdrawal schedule, as reported by The New York Times, the number of troops was to go down from 66,000 troops to 60,500 by the end of May 2013. By the end of November 2013, the number would be down to 52,000. By the end of February 2014, the troop level was to be around 32,000. The Washington Post reported a slightly different withdrawal plan which called for the U.S. forces figure of 68,000 troops to drop to about 60,000 by May 2013 and 52,500 by November 2013. The largest exodus would occur in December 2013 and January 2014, when about 18,500 troops were to leave Afghanistan. The White House intended to allow the military to determine the pace at which the 34,000 troops are withdrawn over the 12 months until February 2013. Top U.S. military officers said they hopeed to keep as many forces as possible in Afghanistan through summer 2013, when combat with the Taliban is usually at its highest. "Commanders will have discretion on pace of this drawdown which will allow them to maintain the force they need through the fighting season," according to one official.

The drawdown announcement generated mixed reactions in Afghanistan. While Afghan parties like Karzai and the Taliban welcomed Obama's decision, many Afghans worried that a quick drawdown would destabilize the country. Afghans also expressed their concern that Afghan security forces were not ready to handle the country's security on its own.

By September 2013, the U.S. military was flying out a large amount of gear instead of using cheaper overland and sea routes, while U.S. officials declined to elaborate on the reasons for their heavy reliance on the more expensive methods of transport.

==== NATO transfer of security responsibilities to Afghan forces ====
On 18 June 2013, the handover of security from NATO to Afghan forces was completed. The International Security Assistance Force formally handed over control of the last 95 districts to Afghan forces at a ceremony attended by Karzai and NATO Secretary General Anders Fogh Rasmussen at a military academy outside Kabul. Following the handover, Afghan forces were to lead security efforts in all 403 districts of Afghanistan's 34 provinces. Before the handover they were responsible for 312 districts nationwide, where 80 percent of Afghanistan's population of nearly 30 million lives. "Our security and defense forces will now be in the lead," Karzai said. "From here, all security responsibility and all security leadership will be taken by our brave forces. When people see security has been transferred to Afghans, they support the army and police more than before." Secretary General Rasmussen said that by taking the lead in security, Afghan forces were completing a five-stage transition process that began in March 2011. "They are doing so with remarkable resolve," he said. "Ten years ago, there were no Afghan national security forces ... now you have 350,000 Afghan troops and police, a formidable force." The security transition signaled an important shift in the war. The ISAF was slated to end its mission by the end of 2014, and coalition forces were in the process of closing bases and shipping out equipment. Rasmussen stated that the focus of ISAF forces were to shift from combat to support and that by the end of 2014, Afghanistan would be fully secured by Afghans. After the handover, 100,000 NATO forces were to be in a supporting and training role, as Afghan soldiers and police took the lead in the fight against armed groups. "We will continue to help Afghan troops in operations if needed, but we will no longer plan, execute or lead those operations, and by the end of 2014 our combat mission will be completed," Rasmussen added.

==== Bilateral Security Agreement negotiations ====
===== Initial suspension =====
Plans by the U.S. to engage in peace talks with the Taliban resulted in a suspension of bilateral security discussions between the U.S. and the Afghan government on 13 June 2013. "In a special meeting chaired by President Hamid Karzai, the president has decided to suspend talks about a security pact with the U.S. because of their inconsistent statements and actions in regard to the peace process," spokesman Aimal Faizi told Reuters. Secretary of State John Kerry discussed the flare-up with Karzai in phone calls on 19 June 2013, Afghan and U.S. officials said, part of the latest round of crisis diplomacy between Washington and Afghanistan's mercurial leader. Negotiations on the Bilateral Security Agreement (BSA) began earlier 2013 and, if completed, will define the shape of the U.S. military presence in Afghanistan for years to come. The security discussions between the U.S. and Afghanistan would provide for a limited number of military trainers and counterterrorism forces to remain in the country. The talks have been complicated by several disagreements, including over the immunity that U.S. troops would enjoy from Afghan laws. Speaking to reporters days before the suspension, U.S. Marine Corps General Joseph Dunford, the commander of the U.S.-led coalition, said, "The bilateral security agreement is critical to any post-2014 presence. So it needs to be taken seriously on both sides." It was not clear how long Karzai would withdraw from the security talks with the US, meant to finalise arrangements for keeping a small US presence in the country after the last of the NATO troops leave 2014. Karzai has said the negotiations would not resume until the Taliban met directly with representatives of the Afghan government, essentially linking the security negotiations to a faltering peace process and making the United States responsible for persuading the Taliban to talk to the Afghan government.

===== Agreement on Bilateral Security Agreement draft =====
The United States and Afghanistan reached an agreement on the final language of the bilateral security agreement, which according to State Department spokeswoman Jen Psaki wasn't the final document and which U.S. officials were still reviewing it, on 20 November 2013. A letter written by Obama said U.S. forces will be "cooperating in training, advising, and assisting" Afghan forces "in a targeted, smaller, counterterrorism mission." There is no limit on how long U.S. forces would remain in Afghanistan The accord also has no expiration date. The agreement says that "unless mutually agreed, United States forces shall not conduct combat operations in Afghanistan." It states the parties' "intention of protecting U.S. and Afghan national interests without U.S. military counter-terrorism operations" but does not specifically prohibit such operations. United States Special Operations forces will retain leeway to conduct antiterrorism raids on private Afghan homes American counterterrorism operations will be intended to "complement and support" Afghan missions and that US forces will not conduct military operations in Afghanistan "unless mutually agreed" the text says. It underscores that Afghan forces will be in the lead and that any American military operations will be carried out "with full respect for Afghan sovereignty and full regard for the safety and security of the Afghan people, including in their homes." It also notes that "U.S. forces shall not target Afghan civilians, including in their homes, consistent with Afghan law and United States forces' rules of engagement." Obama wrote in a letter to his Afghan counterpart: "US forces shall not enter Afghan homes for the purposes of military operations, except under extraordinary circumstances involving urgent risk to life and limb of US nationals. We will continue to make every effort to respect the sanctity and dignity of Afghans in their homes and in their daily lives, just as we do for our own citizens."

The agreement does not spell out the number of U.S. forces who will remain, but Karzai said on 21 November 2013 that he envisions up to 15,000 NATO troops being based in the country. According to several estimates, the United States plans to maintain a force of no more than 10,000 troops in Afghanistan after 2014. The draft agreement allows an indefinite U.S. presence, but Karzai said on 21 November 2013 it would be in place for 10 years. The agreement also includes language on the U.S. government's continued funding for Afghan security forces, funneling such contributions through the Kabul-based government.

The agreement text grants the United States full legal jurisdiction over U.S. troops and Defense Department civilians working in Afghanistan. On troop immunity, it says that Afghanistan agrees "that the United States shall have the exclusive right to exercise jurisdiction" over members of the force and its civilian component "in respect of any criminal or civil offenses committed in the territory of Afghanistan.", and that "Afghanistan authorises the United States to hold [civil and criminal] trial in such cases, or take other disciplinary action, as appropriate, in the territory of Afghanistan.", but Afghan authorities can ask that anyone be taken out of the country. Afghan authorities are prohibited from detaining American troops or U.S. civilians working with them. In the event that happens "for any reason," however, those personnel "shall be immediately handed over to United States forces authorities." The agreement also specifies that American troops and civilians cannot be surrendered to any "international tribunal or any other entity or state" without express U.S. consent. Afghanistan, it says, retains legal jurisdiction over civilian contractors, and contractors are prohibited from wearing military uniforms and "may only carry weapons in accordance with Afghan laws and regulations."

The document has a clause committing the United States to consulting with the Afghan government in the event of external threats, but not the sort of NATO-style mutual defense pact the Afghans originally wanted. "The United States shall regard with grave concern any external aggression or threat of external aggression against the sovereignty, independence, and territorial integrity of Afghanistan," the proposed agreement states. There is a later clause saying they would "consult urgently" in the event of such aggression. Obama added in a letter to his Afghan counterpart: "The US commitment to Afghanistan's independence, territorial integrity, and national unity, as enshrined in our Strategic Partnership Agreement, is enduring, as is our respect for Afghan sovereignty."

In a preamble, the draft specifies that "the United States does not seek permanent military facilities in Afghanistan, or a presence that is a threat to Afghanistan's neighbors, and has pledged not to use Afghan territory or facilities as a launching point for attacks on other countries." It says that "unless otherwise mutually agreed, United States forces shall not conduct combat operations in Afghanistan" and makes no promise of U.S. military support in the event of an attack or other security threat to Afghanistan. If there is such a threat, it says, the United States will regard it with "grave concern," consult and "shall urgently determine support it is prepared to provide." But the United States stated the U.S. will regard any external aggression with "grave concern" and will "strongly oppose" military threats or force against Afghanistan after 2014.

The draft agreement says that U.S. military and Defense Department civilian personnel are exempt from visa requirements and taxation. Afghan taxes and other fees will not be imposed on the entry or exit of goods specifically for the use of U.S. forces. An annex to the draft lists locations where Afghanistan agrees to provide facilities for U.S. forces, including Kabul; Bagram, north of the capital, where the United States has its largest current base; Mazar-e Sharif in northern Afghanistan; Herat in the west; Kandahar in the south; Shindand in Herat province; Sharab in Helmand province; Gardez, south of Kabul; and Jalalabad, to the east. The draft document gives the U.S. the right to deploy American forces on nine bases, including the two biggest, the airfields in Bagram and Kandahar. It also allows U.S. military planes to fly in and out of Afghanistan from seven air bases, including Kabul International Airport. U.S. forces would be permitted under the document to transport supplies from five border crossings, described along with the air bases as "official points of embarkation and debarkation." All bases in Afghanistan would revert to Afghan ownership and sovereignty after 2014, according to the draft.

The draft of the agreement was finalized early on 19 November 2013 after Obama wrote Karzai a letter assuring him that U.S. forces will continue to respect the "sanctity and dignity of the Afghan people." The agreement must as of 21 November 2013 be ratified by an Afghan grand council of elders and be ratified by the parliaments of Afghanistan and the United States. The agreement, according to the draft wording, takes effect 1 January 2015 and then "it shall remain in force until the end of 2024 and beyond" unless terminated with two years' advance notice. Karzai said that the agreement would not be signed until after 2014 elections in Afghanistan, but U.S. officials have said unequivocally that the agreement must be signed by the end of the year 2013, if not sooner, to allow the Pentagon to prepare for its role after the American combat mission ends. White House Press secretary Jay Carney said the agreement under consideration by the loya jirga is the Obama administration's "final offer." If not enacted by the end of the year, Carney said, it "would be impossible for the United States and our allies to plan for a presence post-2014." Karzai, who earlier stated he would sign what he had agreed to sign, stated later, after the announcement of the Bilatereal Security Agreement (BSA) draft text, that he wouldn't sign it until 2014, after a presidential election to choose his successor, but before he leaves office. Aimal Faizi, a spokesman for Karzai, stated that Karzai wanted to wait until after the election in April 2014 to test further conditions: whether American forces would stop raids on Afghan homes, whether the Obama Administration will help stabilize security in Afghanistan, help promote peace talks and not interfere in the election. Officials of the Obama Administration consider the signing date to be nonnegotiable, citing the need for at least a year to plan future deployments and to allow coalition partners, including Germany and Italy, to plan for a residual troop presence that they have offered.

The text of the BSA was approved by the delegates at the Loya Jirga on 24 November 2013 and must now be signed by the Afghanistan president, who rejected the final recommendation of the Loya Jirga promptly to sign the BSA with the United States, and sent to the parliament for final ratification. If approved, the agreement would allow the U.S. to deploy military advisors to train and equip Afghan security forces, along with U.S. special-operations troops for anti-terrorism missions against Al Qaeda and other terrorist groups. Obama will determine the size of the force. The jirga set a few conditions before expressing approval for the agreement among them a 10-year time limit on the post-2014 troop presence and reparations for damages caused by U.S. troops deployed in Afghanistan. It also voted to attach a letter by Obama; pledging that U.S. troops would enter Afghan homes only in "extraordinary" circumstances and only if American lives were at direct risk, to the BSA. The elder assembly also demanded the release of 19 Afghans from the U.S. detention center at Guantanamo Bay and a stronger U.S. pledge to defend Afghanistan from any incursion from it neighbors, particularly Pakistan. The loya jirga also voted to request that the U.S. military add a base to the nine bases that would be occupied by U.S. troops under the proposed security pact after combat forces depart Afghanistan by the end of 2014. The base is in Bamian Province in central Afghanistan, where the NATO-led military coalition has maintained a presence. Bamian is a population center for Hazaras, a Shiite minority whose members were massacred by the Taliban prior to the U.S.-led invasion that toppled the militant group. Afghan analysts said Hazara delegates proposed the additional base. At least five of the 50 jirga committees raised objections to the article addressing "status of personnel" which "authorises the United States to hold [civil and criminal] trial ... or take other disciplinary action, as appropriate, in the territory of Afghanistan" when a US soldier is accused of criminal activity. Spokespeople from at least two committees directly stated that Afghanistan should have jurisdiction over any US soldiers accused of crimes on Afghan soil. Several committees also stated that if trials are held in the United States, families of victims should have access to and presence in US-held trials at the expense of Washington.

=== 2014 drawdown ===
The US force level will drop to between 10,000 and 20,000 troops according to the Long War Journal. They will consist of Special Forces, counterterrorism forces, and military training personnel. They will be deployed to a small number of bases around the country. US/ISAF troops will continue their training of Afghan National Security Forces soldiers. Counterterrorism forces will concentrate mostly on high-value targets. U.S. Secretary of Defense Leon Panetta stated on 12 November 2012 that the Obama Administration will cease combat operations by the end of 2014, but it is still refining its timeline for withdrawing the remaining 68,000 U.S. troops in Afghanistan. The administration was also debating how many trainers, Special Operations forces and military assets it will keep in the country after that to support Afghanistan's army and police.

During a surprise trip to Afghanistan in May 2014 Obama stated that the United States wanted to sign a bilateral security agreement with Afghanistan for the purpose of continuing training/advising Afghan forces and assisting in specific counterterrorism missions. The winner of Afghanistan's presidential runoff election – between former Afghan foreign minister Abdullah Abdullah and onetime World Bank economist Ashraf Ghani – will be asked immediately to sign the security agreement that will help determine how many U.S. forces, as of May 2014 numbering 32,000, will remain in Afghanistan after the end of the year 2014. U.S. officials said the security agreement must be endorsed as soon as possible to give U.S. military planners time to complete drawdown schedules – including decisions on what bases to close – and make arrangements for the next phase of the U.S. military presence after nearly 13 years of war. Pentagon general counsel Stephen Preston said in May 2014 before the U.S. Senate that the 2014 drawdown planning and the post 2014 presence planning will concentrate on "what the circumstances, the mission and presence in Afghanistan will be."

On 27 May 2014, Obama announced that U.S. combat operations in Afghanistan would end in December 2014 and that the troops levels will be reduced to 9,800 troops by this time.

On 5 August 2014, a gunman dressed in an Afghan military uniform opened fire on a number of U.S., foreign and Afghan soldiers, killing Major General Harold J. Greene and wounding about 15 officers and soldiers including a German brigadier general and eight U.S. soldiers. For the U.S. Armed Forces, it was the first death of a general on foreign battlefields in 44 years.

After 13 years the United Kingdom, the United States and the remaining Australians officially ended their combat operation in Afghanistan on 28 October 2014. On that day Britain handed over its last base in Afghanistan, Camp Bastion in the southern province of Helmand, to Afghanistan, while the United States handed over its last base, Camp Leatherneck in the southern province of Helmand.

== 2014–2016 presence plans ==
During the 2012 Chicago Summit NATO and its partners agreed to withdraw its combat troops from Afghanistan by the end of 2014. A new and different NATO mission will then advise, train and assist the Afghan security forces including the Afghan Special Operations Forces. Final decisions on the size of the American and NATO presence after 2014 and its precise configuration have not been made by the United States or its NATO allies as of 26 November 2012, but one option calls for about 10,000 American and several thousand non-American NATO troops according to the United States. The presence shall include a small American counterterrorism force consisting of fewer than 1,000 American troops, while in a parallel effort, NATO forces would advise Afghan forces at major regional military and police headquarters. According to The New York Times, NATO forces would most likely have a minimal battlefield role, with the exception of some special operations advisers.

An important question for the NATO mission after 2014 was what level of the Afghan military hierarchy they would advise. It was generally expected that they would advise seven regional Afghan Army corps and several regional Afghan police headquarters. The arrangement would largely insulate the NATO advisers from the battlefield, though officials said advisers might accompany Afghan brigades on major operations. It was unlikely that NATO officers would advise Afghan battalions on the battlefield, because that would require many more advisers than NATO was likely to muster and would entail more risk than most nations seem prepared to assume, though some American experts believed it would make the Afghan military more effective. Still, NATO special operations advisers would be likely to accompany Afghan Army commandos and police SWAT-type units on the battlefield.

A major challenge was that Afghanistan would not have an effective air force before 2017, if then. As a consequence American officials said that NATO airpower would remain in Afghanistan after 2014 but will likely only be used on behalf of NATO and American troops and perhaps Afghan units that are accompanied by NATO advisers. NATO forces relied heavily on airpower for airstrikes, supply and medical evacuation since Afghanistan's roads are in poor condition and often seeded with bombs. To compensate for Afghanistan's limited airpower, the United States was working on a number of fixes, including providing Afghan forces with armored vehicles that would be equipped with mortars and assault guns. The United States was looking into expanding the purchase of turboprop planes for the Afghans. In addition the U.S. was also trying to help Afghan pilots learn to fly at night. Equally troubling was according to the New York Times the problem of medical evacuations. Because after 2014 the Afghans would almost certainly need to rely on a system that depended more on ground transportation than helicopters the United States wanted to help Afghanistan forces develop more field hospitals.

Plans for the follow-on military presence are being formulated in the Pentagon, where the largest of several preliminary options calls for about 10,000 troops, with several other NATO governments penciled in for several hundred each. According to these preliminary plans, ISAF's successor would be based in Kabul, with most U.S. training and counterterrorism troops probably stationed in Kandahar and at the air base at Bagram. Both locations are to be converted to Afghan ownership. Smaller counterterrorism units of the Joint Special Operations Command would be positioned primarily in the eastern part of the country, where most of their activities take place. Italy, in charge of the ISAF mission in Herat in western Afghanistan, would remain there to train Afghans. Germany would do the same in Mazar-e Sharif in the north. It is unclear what would happen at Camp Bastion, the British headquarters in Helmand province.

The size of the American military presence after 2014 will help determine the size of the American civilian footprint. As of December 2012 the United States are reducing its plans for large civilian force in post-2014 Afghanistan, because the U.S. military is certain to curtail or stop the security and other services it provides U.S. government civilians in Afghanistan. Firm decisions on civilian numbers and locations cannot be made "until we resolve exactly what the military follow-on numbers are going to be," one unnamed U.S. official said. "That will determine . . . where we locate, what kind of security, medical and other support we might be able to get." According to the New York Times the U.S. military wants to retain 9,000 U.S. troops in Afghanistan, while the Obama administration wants a force of 3,000 to 9,000 troops in Afghanistan after 2014.

During a meeting with Karzai on 11 January 2013, Obama stated that he will determine the pace of U.S. combat troops drawdown and their withdrawal from Afghanistan by the end of 2014 after consultations with commanders on the ground. He also said any U.S. mission in Afghanistan beyond 2014 would focus solely on counterterrorism operations and training Afghan security forces. According to Obama any agreement on troop withdrawals must include an immunity agreement in which US troops are not subjected to Afghan law. "I can go to the Afghan people and argue for immunity for U.S. troops in Afghanistan in a way that Afghan sovereignty will not be compromised, in a way that Afghan law will not be compromised," Karzai replied.

During his 2013 State of the Union Address Barack Obama announced that 34,000 US troops will leave Afghanistan by February 2014, but did not specify what the post-2014 troop levels would be. "Beyond 2014, America's commitment to a unified and sovereign Afghanistan will endure, but the nature of our commitment will change," Obama said. "We're negotiating an agreement with the Afghan government that focuses on two missions – training and equipping Afghan forces so that the country does not again slip into chaos, and counter-terrorism efforts that allow us to pursue the remnants of al-Qaeda and their affiliates," he added. As of 12 February 2013, Barack Obama has not made a decision on the post-2014 U.S. force. The Obama Administration intends to keep some troops in the country in 2015 and beyond, but the number is still being debated at the White House and must be approved by the Afghan government. Unnamed U.S. officials said there was a reluctance to go public with a final number of troops and a description of their missions while still in the early stage of negotiating a security agreement with the Afghans over retaining a U.S. military presence after 2014. The New York Times reported that the post-2014 force is likely to number no more than 9,000 or so troops and then get progressively smaller. The Washington Post reported that the Pentagon is pushing a plan that would keep about 8,000 U.S. troops in Afghanistan in 2015, but significantly shrink the contingent over the following two years, perhaps to fewer than 1,000 by 2017, according to senior U.S. government officials and military officers. As the result of the suspension of the bilateral security agreement discussions and increasingly frustrated by his dealings with Karzai, Obama was giving in early July 2013 serious consideration to speeding up the withdrawal of United States forces from Afghanistan and to a "zero option" that would leave no American troops there after 2014. At the end of 2013 the United States backed away from its threat to initiate a complete American withdrawal from Afghanistan by the end of 2014, if Karzai refuses to sign the Bilateral Security Agreement by the end of 2013. However the United States stood by its warning that a total military withdrawal is still possible if delays continue. The U.S. Department of Defense proposed to Obama to leave behind 10,000 US troops when their combat mission and that of their allies end there at the end of 2014, or none at all. Caitlin M. Hayden, a spokeswoman for the National Security Council, said that absent an agreement with respect to the B.S.A. between the America and Afghanistan the U.S.A. "will initiate planning for a post-2014 future in which there would be no U.S. or NATO troop presence in Afghanistan.", while the British Ministry of Defense said that until the pact is signed, no decision will be made on the contribution from other nations.

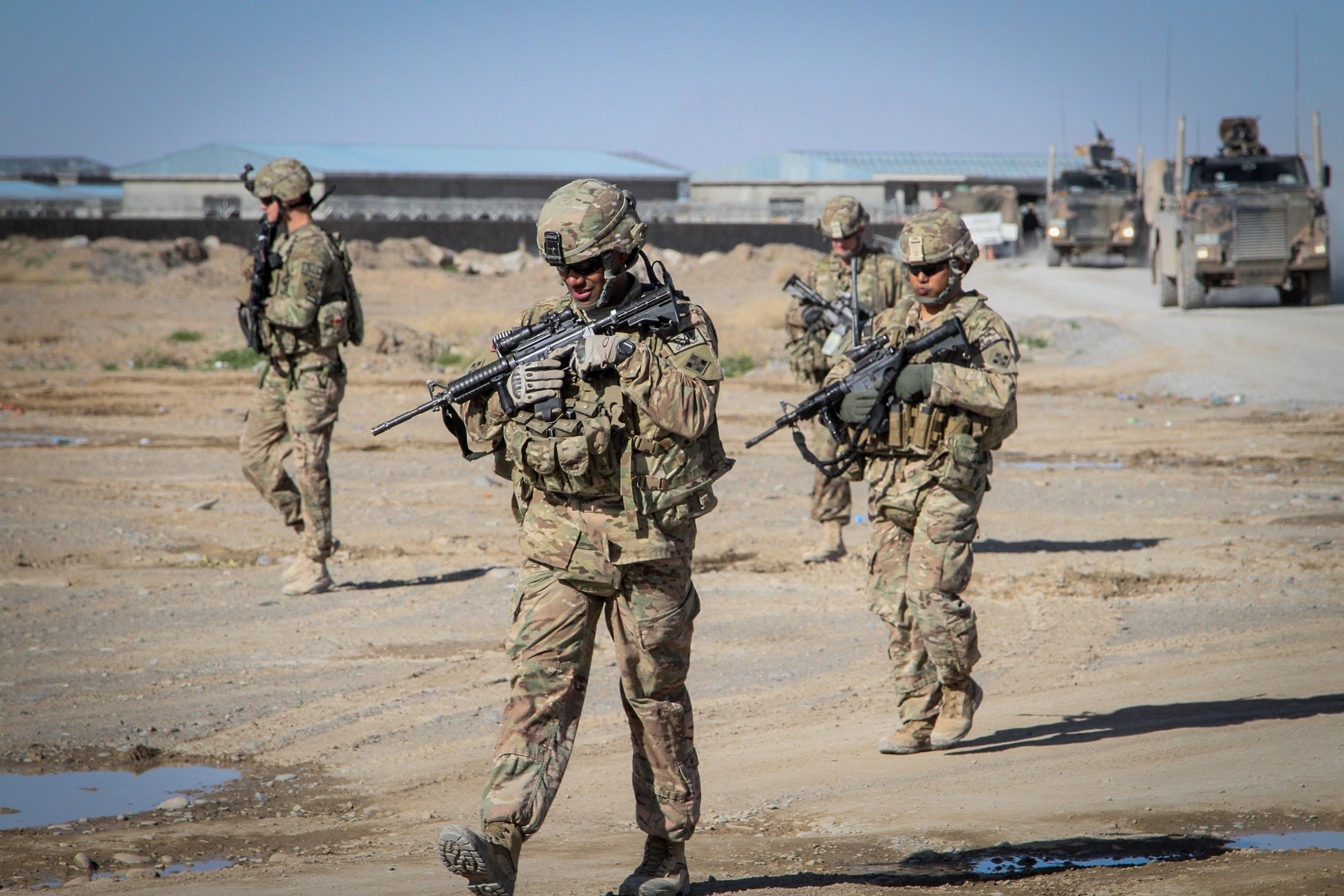
U.S. soldiers on patrol in Kandahar province, Afghanistan, March 2014

By May 2014 no agreement on the bilateral security agreement had been reached. Obama on a trip to Afghanistan in late May 2014 said he was about to make decisions on the transition and was in the country to meet with Afghanistan's leaders prior to making those decisions final. On 27 May 2014, Obama announced that U.S. combat operations in Afghanistan would end in December 2014. A residual force of 9,800 troops would remain in the country which includes a group of troops to train and advise Afghan security forces and a separate group of Special Operations forces to continue counterterrorism missions against remnants of al-Qaeda. These forces would be halved by the end of 2015, and consolidated at Bagram Air Base and in Kabul. Obama also announced that all U.S. forces, with the exception of a "normal embassy presence," would be removed from Afghanistan by the end of 2016. These remaining forces would be a regular armed forces assistance group, largely to handle military sales under the authority of the U.S. ambassador, but also guard the US embassy, train Afghan forces and support counter-terrorism operations. These troop will not exceed 1,000 troops, akin to the security presence that is currently as of May 2014 in Iraq. The president's plans were subject to the approval of the incoming Afghan government and its willingness to sign the bilateral security agreement providing immunity for U.S. troops serving in the country, which outgoing president Karzai had refused to sign. The U.S. post 2014 presence plans were welcomed by outgoing Afghanistan president Hamid Karzai saying that Afghanistan was ready to take responsibility for its own security and the move could pave the way for Taliban peace talks. While Afghanistan military forces reacted to Obama's plans with skepticism arguing among other things that Afghan military's lack of air support and heavy artillery couldn't be overcome by 2016 or 2017 and NATO welcomed the announcement, U.S. politicians split along party lines to Obama's drawdown and post 2014 presence plans, Afghanistan lawmakers considered those plans a blow to Afghan morale and American think tanks questioned the post presence limitation to the end of 2016 pointing out to experience in Germany, Britain, Korea and Japan, where U.S. forces remain long after wars have ended but the need to support strong allies remains.

Afghanistan and the United States signed the bilateral security agreement through U.S. Ambassador James B. Cunningham and Afghan national security adviser Mohammad Hanif the bilateral security agreement on 30 September 2014 in a cordial ceremony at the presidential palace in Kabul, Afghanistan. On that day the NATO Status of Forces Agreement was also signed, giving forces from Allied and partner countries the legal protections necessary to carry out the NATO Resolute Support Mission when International Security Assistance Force comes to an end in 2014. Under both agreements 9,800 American and at least 2,000 NATO troops are allowed to remain in Afghanistan after the international combat mission formally ends on 31 December 2014 while also enabling the continued training and advising of Afghan security forces, as well as counterterrorism operations against remnants of al-Qaeda. Most of the troops will help train and assist the struggling Afghan security forces, although some American Special Operations forces will remain to conduct counterterrorism missions. The Nato-led ISAF mission will transition to a training mission headquartered in Kabul with six bases around the country. Under the BSA the United States are allowed to have bases at nine separate locations across Afghanistan. A base in Jalalabad, in eastern Afghanistan, could also remain a launching point for armed drone missions in Afghanistan and across the border in Pakistan. The agreement also prevents U.S. military personnel from being prosecuted under Afghan laws for any crimes they may commit; instead, the United States has jurisdiction over any criminal proceedings or disciplinary action involving its troops inside the country. The provision does not apply to civilian contractors. The troop number of 9.800 Americans is to be cut in half by 2016, with American forces thereafter based only in Kabul and at Bagram air base. By the end of 2017, the U.S. force is to be further reduced in size to what U.S. officials have called a "normal" military advisory component at the U.S. Embassy in Kabul, most likely numbering several hundred. The BSA goes into force on 1 January 2015 and remains in force "until the end of 2024 and beyond" unless it is terminated by either side with two years' notice.

In November 2014 U.S. President Obama expanded the original role of U.S. Armed Forces in Afghanistan for 2015. Originally they were supposed to advise, train and assist the Afghan Forces and to hunt the remnants of Al Qaeda. Under the president's order U.S. forces can carry out missions against the Taliban and other militant groups threatening American troops or the Afghan government while American jets, bombers and drones can support Afghan troops on combat missions. By the end of 2015, half of the 9,800 American troops would leave Afghanistan. The rest would be consolidated in Kabul and Bagram, and then leave by the end of 2016, allowing Obama to say he ended the Afghan war before leaving office. The United States could still have military advisers in Kabul after 2016 who would work out of an office of security cooperation at the United States Embassy. But the Obama administration has not said how large that contingent might be and what its exact mission would be.

During his last trip to Afghanistan U.S. Secretary of Defense Chuck Hagel announced on 6 December 2014 the end of the U.S. original plan to withdraw its troops form Afghanistan. Under a plan announced in May 2014 the number of American troops was supposed to fall to 9,800 by 1 January 2015. Instead the U.S. will keep up to 10,800 troops for the first few months of 2015 and then restart the drawdown, which is scheduled to reach 5,500 troops by the end of 2015. Besides partaking in NATO's Resolute Support Mission consisting of 12,500 soldiers some U.S. troops will take part in a separate counterterrorism mission focused on al-Qaeda. By the time U.S. President Obama leaves office in 2017 only a small force attached to the U.S. Embassy in Kabul is to remain in Afghanistan. The reason for the United States to keep additional forces in the country temporarily was that planned troop commitments by US allies for the NATO train-and-assist mission starting in January 2015 have been slow to materialize. President Barack Obama "has provided US military commanders the flexibility to manage any temporary force shortfall that we might experience for a few months as we allow for coalition troops to arrive in theater," Hagel said in a news conference with President Ashraf Ghani in Kabul. "But the president's authorization will not change our troops' missions, or the long-term timeline for our drawdown," he added.

At the end of March 2015 U.S. President Obama announced to slow the pace of the U.S. troop withdrawal by maintaining the current force levels of 9,800 troops through at least the end of 2015. This announcement came after a request by the Afghan government under its new president Ashraf Ghani. Obama and Ghani stated the troops were needed to train and advise Afghan forces. According to U.S. official keeping the current force in place would allow American special operations troops and the Central Intelligence Agency to operate in southern and eastern Afghanistan, where the insurgents are strongest and where Al Qaeda's presence is concentrated. Obama also stated to close the remaining U.S. bases in Afghanistan, to withdraw all but about 1,000 troops by the time he leaves office at the beginning of 2017 consolidate the remaining U.S. forces in Kabul. Those forces would operate largely in Kabul and protect embassy personnel and other American officials there. NATO has maintained 13,000 troops including 9,800 Americans in an advisory and counter-terrorism capacity in Afghanistan during the 2015 phase of the War in Afghanistan.

In the wake of the Taliban's capture of Kundus during the Battle of Kunduz and following a US review of its troop presence in Afghanistan U.S. President Obama stated on 15 October 2015 that Afghan security forces are not as strong as they should be and that the security situation in Afghanistan is still very fragile with risks to deteriorate in some parts of the country. For these reasons Obama announced a new $15 billion-a-year plan: The U.S. will maintain its current force of 9,800 through most of 2016, then begin drawing down to 5,500 late in the year or in early 2017. The US forces will be stationed in four garrisons: Kabul, Bagram, Jalalabad and Kandahar. The post-2016 force will still be focused on training and advising the Afghan army, with a special emphasis on its elite counter-terrorism forces. The United States will also maintain a significant counter-terrorism capability of drones and Special Operations forces to strike al-Qaeda, forces of the Islamic State, and other militants who may be plotting attacks against the United States. U.S. counter-terrorism forces deployed at bases in Kandahar and Jalalabad and the Bagram air base outside Kabul will be able to target al-Qaeda forces and forces of the Islamic State, while U.S. advisers can continue to work with key Afghan units, such as air and Special Operations forces, to blunt Taliban attacks.

During a press conference on 6 July 2016 U.S. President Obama said he would draw down troops to 8,400 by the end of his administration in December 2016. He said the troops remaining in Afghanistan would continue to be focused on training and advising the Afghan military and engaging in counter-terrorism efforts. The president warned that a deteriorating security situation in Afghanistan could overwhelm Afghan government partners without further assistance. "It's in our national interest – after all the blood and treasure we have invested – that we give our Afghan partners the support to succeed," said Obama. "This is where al-Qaida is trying to regroup, where Isil is trying to expand its presence," he added. "If they succeed, they will attempt more attacks against us."

== See also ==
- Duty: Memoirs of a Secretary at War
- Taliban insurgency
- Vietnamization (comparable event)
- Withdrawal of United States troops from Iraq (2007–2011) (comparable event)
