= Muhammad ibn Abd al-Jabbar ibn al-Hasan al-Niffari =

Sufi mystic

Muhammad ibn ʿAbd al-Jabbar ibn al-Hasan al-Niffari, commonly known as al-Niffarī (d. c. 965; AH 354), was a 10th-century Sufi mystic known particularly for developing the concept of waqfa, a mystical state in which the mystic hears God directly.

In al-Niffarī's conception of waqfa, the mystic enters a condition of direct audition of God and may also be moved to write automatically according to the divine will. He further maintained that the vision of God is possible in this world.

== Biography ==
Muhammad ibn ‘Abd al-Jabbar ibn al-Hasan al-Niffarī died in the second half of the 10th-century somewhere in Egypt. There is confusion as to the exact year of his death, but a commonly accepted date is 965. Nothing is known of the place or date of his birth, but it is assumed that he is from or associated with the town of Niffar in present day Iraq, or the city of Nippur. Most of what is known about al-Niffarī is taken from the commentary by the 10th-century Sufi scholar Muhammad al-Hashimi al-Tilimsani. While he is relatively unknown and obscure, he is briefly mentioned by the scholars Ibn Arabi, Al-Sha`rani, and Haji Khalifa.

== Works ==
According to al-Tilimsani, the written works attributed to al-Niffarī were not actually written by him. Rather, al-Niffarī wrote down his revelations on scraps of paper and these were compiled by one of his followers, either his son or his grandson; as such, it is unclear whether his revelations were meant to collected and published. Two large collections of al-Niffarī's works exist today, both written in Arabic.

=== Al-Mawāqif ===
The more prominent and seminal of these collected works is Kitāb al-Mawāqif (The Book of Standings). Al-Niffarī used the basical radical w/q/f (to stand) but uses a causative form to indicate an act of being stood up by the divine presence. As such, much of his work depicts an intimate relationship and unity with the divine presence, reflecting the author's attainment of fanā' (dissolution of the ego). These spiritual standings/stayings begin with versions of the phrase "He stayed me", referring to the same causative act. Furthermore, the standings reflect the eminence of the apocalyptic vision and the eschatological revelation, and the polarity of the experience of divine unity that switches between peace and terror. Finally, al-Niffarī purposefully uses unclear pronouns when referring to himself and the divine presence to highlight the confusion and the dissolution of the barrier between the two entities as they merge into one being.

=== Al-Mukhātabāt ===
The other collection of writings by al-Niffarī is al-Mukhātabāt, which refer to a series of spiritual addresses from the divine presence addressed to His servant, i.e. the author.
