= Tahira Asif =

Pakistani politician

- طاہرہ آصف

Member of the National Assembly of Pakistan
- In office 1 June 2013 – 19 June 2014
- Constituency: Reserved seat for woman

Personal details
- Born: 1961 Lahore, Punjab, Pakistan
- Died: 19 June 2014 (aged 52–53) Lahore, Punjab, Pakistan
- Cause of death: Assassination by gunshot
- Party: MQM (2007-2014)

Tahira Asif (Urdu: طاہرہ آصف; 1961 – 19 June 2014) was a Pakistani politician who had been a member of the National Assembly of Pakistan from June 2013 until her assassination.

== Early life ==
She was born in 1961 in Lahore, Pakistan.

== Political career ==
Asif was elected to the National Assembly of Pakistan on a reserved seat for women from Punjab as a candidate of Pakistan Muslim League (Q) (PML (Q)) in the 2002 Pakistani general election.

She left PML (Q) to join Muttahida Qaumi Movement (MQM) in 2007 and resigned from her National Assembly seat.

She ran for the seat of the National Assembly from NA-126 Lahore constituency in the 2008 Pakistani general election but was unsuccessful and secured only 517 votes.

She again ran for the seat of the National Assembly as a candidate of MQM from NA-126 Lahore constituency in the 2013 Pakistani general election but was unsuccessful and secured only 422 votes. However following the general election, she was indirectly elected to the National Assembly as a candidate of MQM on a reserved seat for women from Sindh, where she continued to serve till her death in June 2014.

== Death ==
Asif was shot on 18 June 2014 by two armed men, while she was traveling with her daughter and driver in Lahore. She was admitted to Shaikh Zayed Hospital where she died on 19 June 2014.

MQM announced three days of mourning. National Assembly paid her tribute and demanded inquiry into her killing. Altaf Hussain, leader of MQM said that her murder was a target killing from religious extremists as she had not been provided adequate security.

== See also ==
- Farida Siddiqui
