= Islam and astrology =

Astrology refers to the study of the movements and relative positions of celestial bodies interpreted as having an influence on human affairs and the natural world. In early Islamic history, astrology (ʿilm al-nujūm, lit. 'the science of the stars'), was "by far" the most popular of the "numerous practices attempting to foretell future events or discern hidden things", according to historian Emilie Savage-Smith.

Some medieval Muslims took an interest in the study of the apparent motion of the stars. This was partly because they considered the celestial bodies to be essential, and partly because the dwellers of desert-regions often traveled at night, and relied upon knowledge of the constellations for guidance in their journeys. After the arrival of Islam, Muslims needed to determine the time of the prayers, which direction the kaaba would face, and the correct orientation of the mosque, all of which helped give a religious impetus to the study of astronomy and contributed towards the belief that the heavenly bodies were influential upon terrestrial affairs as well as the human condition in life.

Islamic jurisprudence, the Quran, the Hadith, Ijma (scholarly consensus) and Qiyas (analogy) lay out the guidelines for the stance that Islam takes on astrology. The determination on the concept is further subdivided into that which is either halal (allowed) or haram (forbidden).

== Types ==
In early Islamic history, astrology has several categories:

- "non-horoscopic astrology" that involves "the prediction of events based upon the rising or setting of certain star groups";
- "judicial astrology" involving "calculating the positions of planets and the mathematical production of horoscopes"
  - to determine the fate of individuals, countries, or dynasties,
  - of "auspicious and inauspicious days"; and
  - to answer specific questions—the location of lost objects, buried treasure, or "the diagnosis and prognosis of disease".

== Origins of astrology in Islam ==
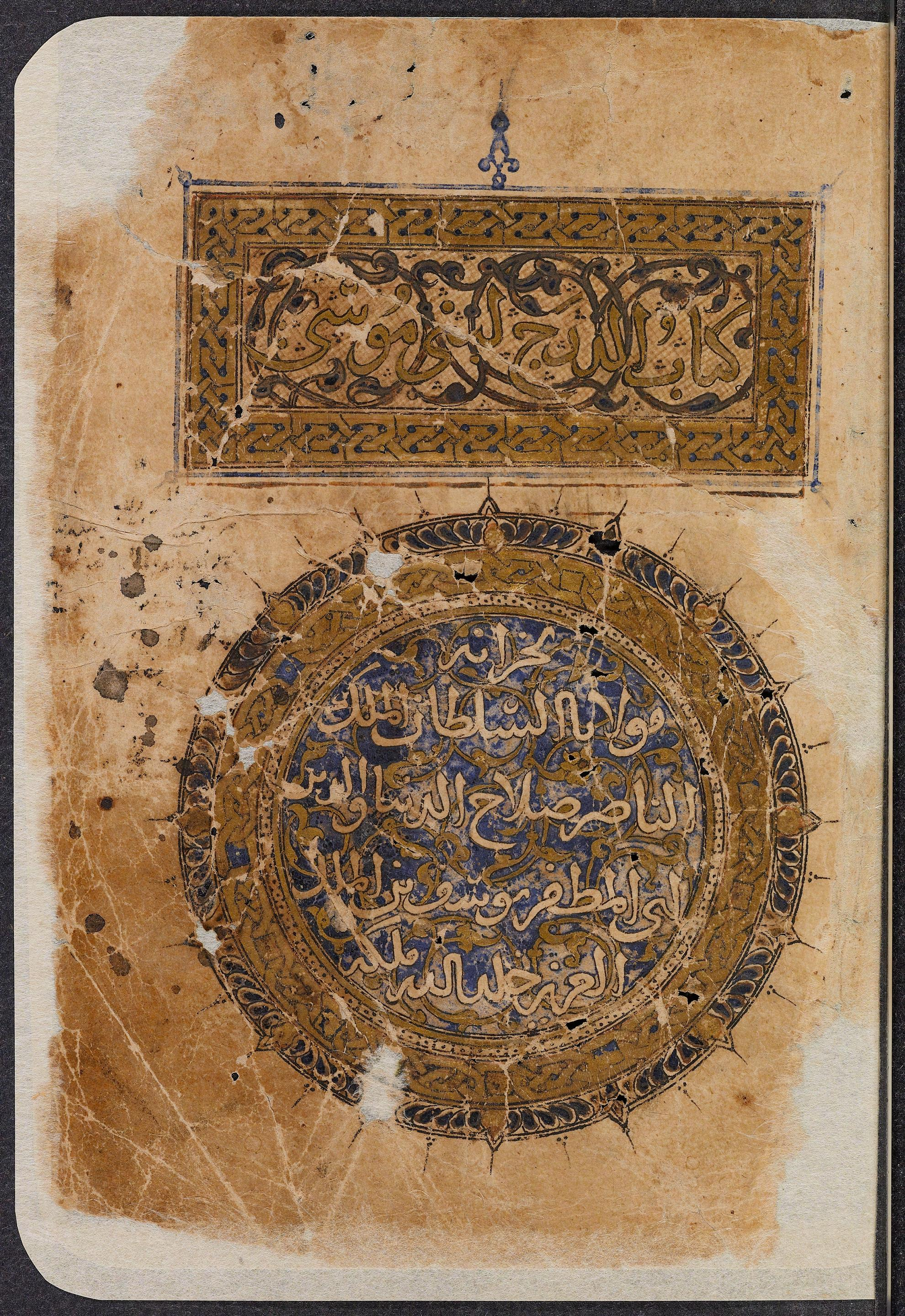
Kitāb al-Daraj; an early Islamic work evidencing the prominence of astrology in early Islam.

The earliest traces of Muslim individuals and therefore an Islamic stance against that of astrology stems from individuals such as Abd al-Jabbar. This stance differs from that posed by individuals such as Abu Ma'shar al-Balkhi who sought to justify the causal influence of celestial beings on terrestrial life forms. This is further evidenced by the presence of historical texts such as Kitab al-Daraj which are proof of the presence of astrology in early Islam. Yet even before these individuals/texts there existed historians and theologians such as Al Hashimi who through philosophers such as Masha Allah sought to justify the role of astrology in influencing Islamic adherents religion. Al Hashimi, citing upon the authority of Masha Allah looked to explore the possibility of the influence of stars on ones morality and religion in general. Masha Allah is further cited to point to the idea that the Islamic prophet Muhammad's birth was a result of a coming together as such of celestial objects otherwise known as planetary conjunction; essentially pointing to the inherent birth of Muhammad as a result of the astrological events. Where both Masha Allah and Al Hashimi draw upon similarities however is their inherent stance in pointing to the planets, stars, and other celestial beings as being the primary means by which divine rule is exercised i.e. how God emanates control over all life forms. The vast criticism received by individuals such as Al Hashimi led such figures to suggest that the determination of astrological claims could be computed without any interference with religion. The work of Al Hashimi nevertheless points to the inherent presence of astrology in early Islam. Although astrology is not generally permissible in Islam, early Muslims relied on the sun and moon to determine things important such as the direction of Mecca, fasting times for Ramadan, and the beginning and end of each month. Even though early Muslim astrologers focused more on the planets and their energy, the traditional zodiac symbols derived from Hellenistic astrology were maintained throughout their practices. They used astrology and the position of the planets to predict the health and well-being of individuals. Eclipses in Libra, Aquarius, or Gemini were predictions of worldwide plagues, and comets or shooting stars were predictions of famine and sickness.

== Astrology in the Quran ==
Many interpretations of the Quran (the primary Islamic text) point to Astrology as that which goes against the fundamental principles preached by the Islamic religious tradition. Astrology ultimately points to the role of celestial beings in influencing terrestrial life and the everyday lives of individuals; ultimately hindering their destiny. Various excerpts from the Quran are interpreted to disprove this theory. Most evidently with regards to those of horoscopes, Islamic scholars take the statements of the Quran in Surah Al-Jinn where it is suggested "(He Alone is) the All-Knower of the ghayb (unseen), and He reveals to none His ghayb (unseen), except to a Messenger (from mankind) whom He has chosen. (He informs him of unseen as much as He likes), and then He makes a band of watching guards (angels) march before him and after him" to mean that any such presence of extraterrestrial influence on mankind is not plausible and is, therefore, haram (forbidden) in Islam. This is further accentuated by tafsir (scholarly interpretation) of the verse which point to the fact that any being other than Allah (God) cannot be attributed with knowledge of the unseen or for that matter unknown. It is in this that the use of horoscopes and the subsequent utilisation of astrology are disproved in Islam. Nevertheless, Islam gives rise through the Quran to the use of astronomy, as distinct from astrology, in determining the time of the year (i.e. the determination of the Lunar and Solar Calendars) as well as compass bearings. The Quran embodies this concept in pointing to celestial beings as 'landmarks' adorned for adherents as a means by which they would guide themselves. The Quran, therefore, points to the primary purpose of astrology as a means of providing physical guidance/navigation for an adherent, essentially considering its use in the capacity of horoscopes as forbidden.

Quranic Verses Regarding Astrology
Surah	Verse
Al Ma'idah Verse 3	"Forbidden also is to use arrows seeking luck or decision; all that is disobedience of Allah and sin"
Luqman Verse 34	“Oh! Allah! With Him is knowledge of the Hour. He sends down the rain and knows that which is in the wombs. No soul knows what it will earn tomorrow, and no soul knows in what land it will die. Oh! Allah is Knower, Aware.”
Hajj Verse 18	Do you not see that Allah is He, Who obeys whoever is in the heavens and whoever is in the earth, and the sun and the moon and the stars, and the mountains and the trees, and the animals and many of the people; and many there are against whom chastisement has become necessary; and whomsoever Allah abases, there is none who can make him honorable; surely Allah does what He pleases.

== Astrology in the Hadith ==
The Hadith is a reference to the instructions and practices of Muhammad which adherents of the Islamic faith are encouraged to embody. Muhammad made various claims regarding the legality/illegality of astrology with regards to the Islamic religious tradition. Narrated by Abu Dawud, it is suggested that Muhammad stated "Whoever seeks knowledge from the stars is seeking one of the branches of witchcraft…”; that of which is inherently forbidden in Islam. Where the Hadith distinctly points to a strong stance against astrology and the consequent imposition of astrology as that which is forbidden is in Sahih Bukhari which is an authenticated source of the recounts of Muhammad. The Hadith suggests that rain is a bounty bestowed only by Allah (God). It goes on to suggest that any adherent that believes that rain is a result of the doings of any other being; living or not falls into disbelief. The Hadith makes specific mention to the stars in suggesting that as for those individuals who suggest rain originates as a result of a star, "that one is a disbeliever in Me (Allah)." This works to fundamentally embody the concept of astrology and the consequent belief in the idea that celestial beings have an influence on anything other than that enshrined in the Quran and Hadith as that which constitutes shirk (blasphemy); leading one to leave the fold of the religion. In ultimately pointing out that any suggestion of stars as performing any other duties other than as a means of navigation for man is forbidden, the Hadith works to point to astrology as something from which Muslims should refrain.

Hadith Regarding Astrology
Text	Hadith
Abu Dawud	"Whoever approaches an oracle or fortune teller has disbelieved in what was revealed to Muhammad."

== Scholarly views on astrology ==
Varying scholars have differing opinions with regards to astrology and the judgment which Islam makes on its permissibility. One concept put forward arises from Imam Ali; the fourth caliph of Islam and the cousin and son-in-law of Muhammad. Ali's pertinent point of view saw astrology to be that which is fundamentally forbidden in the Islamic religion. In suggesting to his followers that "O' People! Beware of learning the science of stars except that with which guidance is sought on land or sea because it leads to divining and an astrologer is a diviner, while the diviner is like the sorcerer, the sorcerer is like the unbeliever and the unbeliever would be in Hell", Ali sought to provide a scholarly opinion in pointing to a belief that any celestial being could provide something greater than that of God constitutes disbelief in Islam. This works in congruence with that encapsulated by the Quran which points to the stars and thus astrology as only a means of navigation. On the contrary, prominent individuals such as Ibn Arabi provide a scholarly opinion which provides for a limited scope of agreement with the principles of astrology. This is accentuated by the Ikhwan who have pointed to particular prophets and thus historic events as being intrinsically influenced by celestial beings. Such individuals nevertheless are in agreement that the planets in no means are considered God yet do suggest/assign each prophet with a particular planet/celestial being with certain works pointing to the planets as being created in God's image. Furthermore, prophet Idris, commonly known as Enoch, was gifted with great knowledge of the stars and used his gift to meditate upon God’s grandeur and teach to others. With his complex understanding of astrology, prophet Idris taught people how the universe impacted their lives and founded the study of the stars. It is said that as Idris gave such credit to the stars and the moon for all of their contributions to mankind, when he died, he rose to the heavens. It is clarified that Idris ascended to the heavens and then died there. Idris journeyed to paradise and left behind him the understanding of astrology known in Islam now.

== Islamic sects and astrology ==
Differing sects of Islam offer varying perspectives on the concept of astrology.

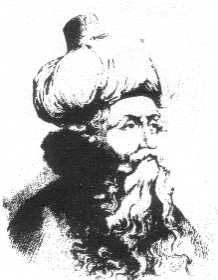
Sheikh al-Akbar Ibn Arabi; a prominent Islamic preacher whose vast studies encompassed astrology.

=== Sunni Islam ===
Prominent Classical Sunni scholars such as Ghazali and Ibn Arabi offer somewhat differing perspectives on astrology from many modern Sunni Muslims. Most pertinently, they focus on mankind at the forefront of the cosmos which consequently revolves around man. Ultimately, according to the teachings of Ghazali and Ibn Arabi, Islam preaches an abstract form of astrology in which the planetary beings correspond to certain levels of heaven and where particular prophets correspond to certain heavens; thus perpetuating in a fundamental belief that particular historical events have eventuated as a result of celestial beings.

=== Shia Islam ===
Shia Islam takes a similar stance to that of Sunni islam with prominent scholars such as Qabisah and Razin Bin Muawiyah suggesting that the presence of stars and celestial beings and their consequent importance lie only in their beautification of the sky, their ability to ward off Satan, and their use in navigation. Prominent Shia scholars have claimed that the concept of astrology is one which leads individuals to commit the sin of shirk (blasphemy); arguing that the concept of inferring something to carry a good or bad omen as that which constitutes disbelief.

== See also ==
- Christian views on astrology
- Islam and magic
- Jewish astrology
- Jewish views on astrology
- Superstitions in Muslim societies
- Zairja
