= Hashemites (disambiguation) =

Hashemites, Hashimites, or Hashimids, may refer to:

- Banu Hashim, the descendants of Hashim ibn Abd Manaf, Arab sub-tribe of the Quraysh
  - Hashimi Dress, dress associated with the women of the tribe
- Hashemite (mineral), a very rare barium chromate mineral
- House of Hashim of the Hejaz (1916–1925), Iraq (1921–1958), and Jordan (1921–present)
  - The Sharifs of Mecca, the rulers of Mecca from the 10th century until 1924, from whom the modern Hashemite royal family descends
- Hashimiyya, a sub-sect of the Kaysanite Shia that acknowledged the Imamate of Abu Hashim ibn Muhammad ibn al-Hanafiyah
- Hashimids (Darband), Arab rulers of Derbent in Dagestan
- Hashimites of Kakori or Kakori Shaikh, Muslim community in India

== See also ==
- Hashim, name
- Al-Hashimi (surname)
