= Abd al-Rahman al-Shaghouri =

Syrian Sufi master (1912–2004)

Sayyid Shaykh Abd al-Rahman al-Shaghouri
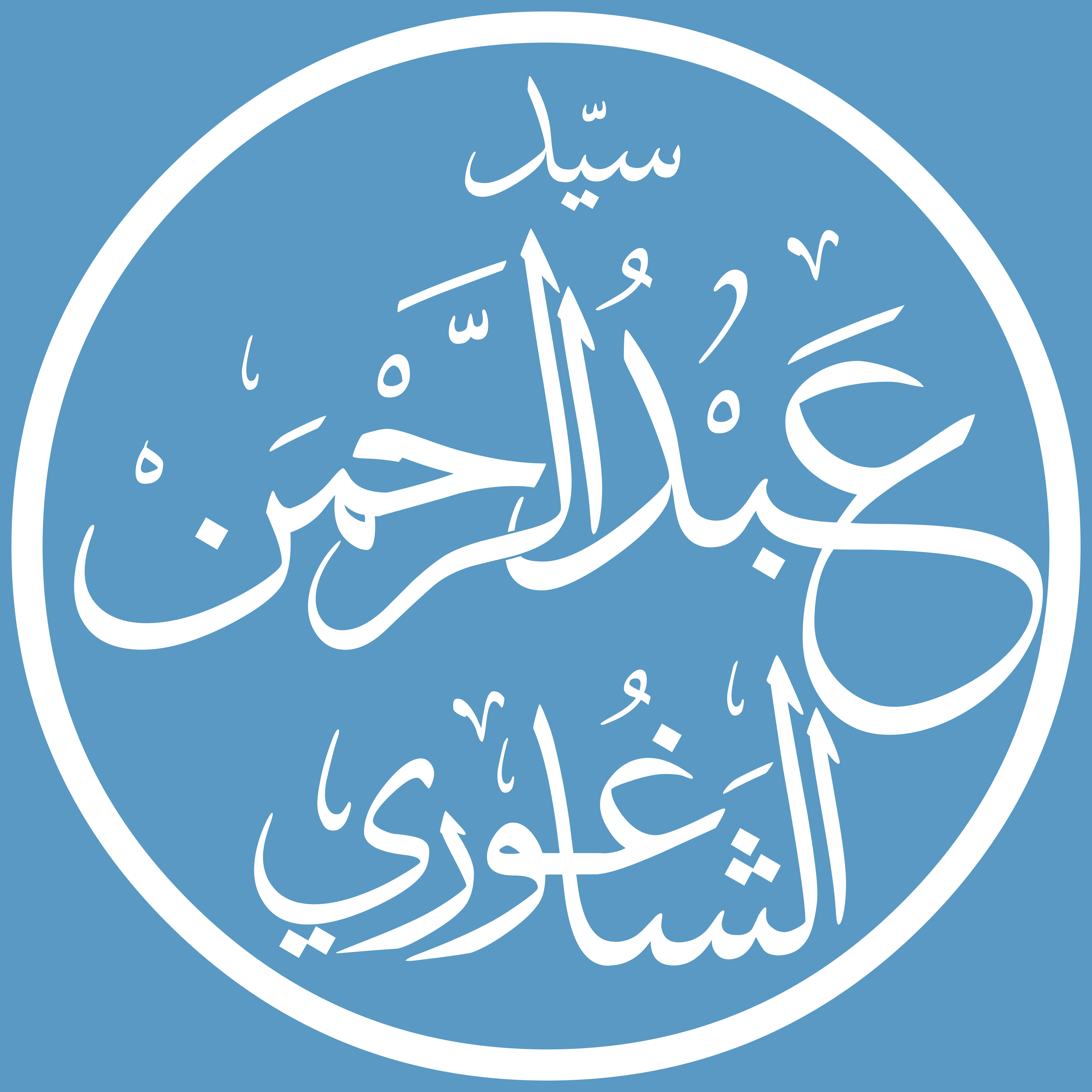
- Born: Abd al-Rahman al-Shaghouri al-Hussayni; 1 July 1912; Homs, Syria
- Died: 8 June 2004 (aged 92); Damascus, Syria

Academic work
- School or tradition: Sunni, Shadhili, (Sufi)

Sayyid ʿAbd al-Raḥmān ibn ʿAbd al-Raḥmān ibn Muṣṭafā ibn ʿAbd al-Raḥmān Zayn al-ʿAbidīn al-Shāghūrī al-Ḥusaynī (Arabic: أبو منير عبد الرحمن بن عبد الرحمن بن مصطفى بن عبد الرحمن زين العابدين المشهور بالشاغوري) was a Syrian Sufi master of the Hashimi-Darqawi branch of the Shadhili tariqa, as well as poet, textile worker, and trade unionist.

== Life and work ==
Born in Homs in 1912, al-Shaghouri was soon orphaned and moved to Damascus with his brother. As a child, he worked as an errand boy and later as a weaver.

He attended the lessons of the major scholars of Damascus: Husni al-Baghghal, Muhammad Barakat, 'Ali al-Daqar, Ismail al-Tibi, and Lutfi al-Hanafi. However, his most important teacher was Muhammad al-Hashimi, an Algerian Sufi from Tlemcen who had already been living in Syria for twenty years before becoming the representative of Shaykh Ahmad al-Alawi, spiritual master of the Shadhili tariqa. Al-Shaghouri himself met al-Alawi in 1932 in Damascus, but it was al-Hashimi who served as his spiritual guide. Finding that al-Shaghouri was already suitable, al-Hashimi placed him in a spiritual retreat. On the first day, al-Shaghouri pledged himself to al-Hashimi's guidance, an unusual occurrence in Sufi instruction and discipleship.

Al-Shaghouri soon became an important figure within al-Hashimi's tariqa, serving as the lead singer for his session of sacred dance (Haḍra). Before his death in 1961, al-Hashimi had also given al-Shaghouri permission to transmit the general litany of the tariqa, a daily formula of meditations and prayers that typically serves to signal a disciple's commitment to his tariqa. Although he had received authorization as a full spiritual guide by Muhammad Sa'id al-Hamzawi of Syria and Ali al- Budlaymi of Algeria, he did not take any disciples until he was also authorised by his friend and companion, Muhammad Sa'id al-Kurdi from Irbid (Jordan). Despite al-Kurdi himself being renowned as one of the great spiritual guides of his time, particularly in Jordan, he only gave his authorization to al-Shaghouri to be a spiritual guide and his successor upon his death.

Despite his commitment to his spiritual order, al-Shaghouri always maintained an occupation until his illnesses made him unable to work. He was a textile worker and Syria's representative in the United Arab Workers Union. He was forced to resign for refusing to comply with the nationalization of factories in Syria, and he later became a teacher in many religious institutes in Damascus. He was also a representative of workers in the Syrian Parliament. For years he also gave sermons at the al-Khayyat mosque in Damascus, until 1999 when a stroke resulted in a long coma and left him severely weakened.

As a singer in al-Hashimi's choir for the hadra, al-Shaghouri memorised vast amounts of mystical poetry, which served as the basis for much his teaching and instruction. He was himself a poet, and his poetry was often sung in the hadra, and continues to be sung today. Al-Shaghouri's poetry draws on Arabic and Islamic literary tradition, and combines a genuine spiritual experience with a great mastery of poetical techniques. His poetry is, both in content and in form, akin to that of Ibn al-Farid, Abd al-Ghani al-Nabulsi and Ahmad al-Alawi. He published his poems in a diwan which he edited towards the end of his life, titled "Al-hada’iq al-nadiyya fī al-nasamat al-ruhiyya" ("The dewy gardens in the spiritual breezes"). Some poems have been published separately in many collections.

== Weakness and death ==
Despite his later physical weakness, he never stopped receiving visitors or attending the weekly hadra at the Nur al-Din al-Shahid mosque, in the old quarter of Damascus. He died on 8 June 2004. A great crowd gathered to attend his funeral at the mosque dedicated to Shaykh Muhy al-Din Ibn Arabi. The funeral prayer was led by Habib Ali al-Jifri, from Yemen, a well-known representative of traditional scholarship and Sufism in Arab media. His death was widely mourned by scholars and laymen alike, and he was widely recognized as one of the most important revivers of the Shadhili tariqa and Sufism in general, particularly in Syria.

His legacy and renown has also become widespread (particularly in the English-speaking world) through two American students whom he authorized in the Shadhili tariqa, Nuh Ha Mim Keller and Zaid Shakir.

== Works ==
Collections of his poems

Al-hada’iq al-nadiyya fī al-nasamat al-ruhiyya ("The Dewy Gardens in the Spiritual Breezes"), Damascus, Dār fajr al-‘urūba, 2nd ed., 1998.

== Disciples ==
- Shaykh Nuh Ha Mim Keller
- Shaykh Zaid Shakir
- Shaykh Muhammad al-Yaqoubi
- Shaykh Gibril Haddad
- Habib Ali al-Jifri
- Shaykh Ismail al-Kurdi
- Shaykh Mahmoud al-Husseini

== See also ==
- Sheikh Abubakr Ahmad
- Muhammad al-Yaqoubi
- Muhammad Tahir-ul-Qadri
- Syed Waheed Ashraf
- Hamza Yusuf
