= Hashimi dress =

Iraqi Arabic dress

The Hashimi dress is a kind of dress, usually black, red, or green and gold colored, that is typically worn by the Arab women of Iraq. Some non-Arab ethnic groups in Iraq have also adapted these traditional dresses into their cultures. The name of Hashimi dress is associated with the women of the Arabian tribe of Bani Hashim. The dress can also come in other colors such as green and gold or red and gold. In addition, the dress is typically accompanied with jewelry such as gold earrings, necklaces, and headpieces.

== Iraqi Designers ==
Hana Sadiq, a famous Iraqi designer in the Middle East and Jordan, designs traditional Arabic dresses.
