= Kakori Shaikh =

Family name

Kakorvi Shaikh
- Religions: Tree list: Islam; Sikhism; Hinduism; Tree list end
- Languages: Hindi and Urdu
- Populated states: Uttar Pradesh India and Sindh Pakistan
- Subdivisions: Arbani; Bajoi; Katbar; Gadani; Almani; Hilayo; Noohani; Dodani
- Related groups: "Punjabi Shaikh" "Sindhi Shaikh" "Shaikh"

The Kakori Shaikh are a Muslim community found in the state of Uttar Pradesh in India. They are also found in the province of Sindh in Pakistan, particularly the city of Karachi.

== History and origin ==
The town of Kakori in Lucknow district is home to a number of Alavi, Manihar and Abbasi families, and the words Kakorvi Shaikh literally mean the Shaikhs of the town of Kakori. The term Shaikh (Arabic: شيخ, shaykh; pl. شيوخ shuyūkh), is a word or honorific term in the Arabic language that literally means "elder." It is commonly used to designate an elder of a tribe, a revered wise man, or an Islamic scholar. In India, the Shaikh title is used by the descendants of Arab and other Muslim immigrants who settled in South Asia, and signifies Arab descent. From the beginning of Muslim rule in South Asia in 713 AD, technocrats, bureaucrats, soldiers, traders, scientists, architects, teachers, theologians and Sufis flocked from the rest of the Muslim world, to the Islamic Sultanate in South Asia and settled permanently. The descendants of these Arabs usually use the title of Shaikh. These Shaikh family often claim descent from the early Caliphs of Islam.

The of Kakorvi Shaikh are sometimes referred to as Moulvizadigan (Moulvis) and Makhdoomzadigan (Makhdooms), Alavis indicating that they are descendants of Mullah Abu Bakr Jami Alavi, who settled in Kakori in 1461 and/or descendants of Qari Amir Saifuddin Alavi, who settled in Kakori in 1512.They belong by and large to the Alavi and Abbasi families, who settled in the Awadh region from the 12th.Century onwards. According to a classical Urdu work, the Nafhatun Nasim, which is a record of scions of a 16th-century sage Mullah Abdul Karim Alavi and which was later published by Amir Ahmed Alavi in 1934, and is an historic account of the settlement of these Alavi Shaikhs in the town of Kakori. The name Alavi (Arabic: علوي) signifies ancestry from Ali ibn Abi Talib (Arabic: علي بن أﺑﻲ طالب), the fourth Caliph of Sunni Islam and the first Imam in Shia Islam. Ali was the cousin and son-in-law of Muhammad. In addition, the other major group Shaikh settled in Kakori are the Abbasis. The name denotes descent from Abbas ibn Abd-al-Muttalib, the paternal uncle of Muhammad. The Abbasid caliphate was established by the Abbasi clan and ruled the Middle East during 750–1258AD (510 years). The Hashmities of Kakori are mainly in Karachi, Pakistan.

== Genealogies ==
The Abbasiyan-i- Kakori, is the family tree of Kakorian Abbasi families by Muhammad Hasan Abbasi which was published in 1945. In its present form, Hashimites of Kakori contains genealogical records of an intricate familial hierarchy that evolved predominantly from three houses, the Moulvis, Makhdooms [cf Alavi] and Qazis [cf Abbasi]. The patriarchs of all three houses were émigrés hailing from the Banu Hashim clan [cf Hashemites] of the Quraysh tribe of Hejaz (in present-day Saudi Arabia) [cf Banu Quraysh], who settled in Kakori since the early advent of Islam in the region, back in the 15th century.
