= Maryam Hashemi =

Iranian visual artist

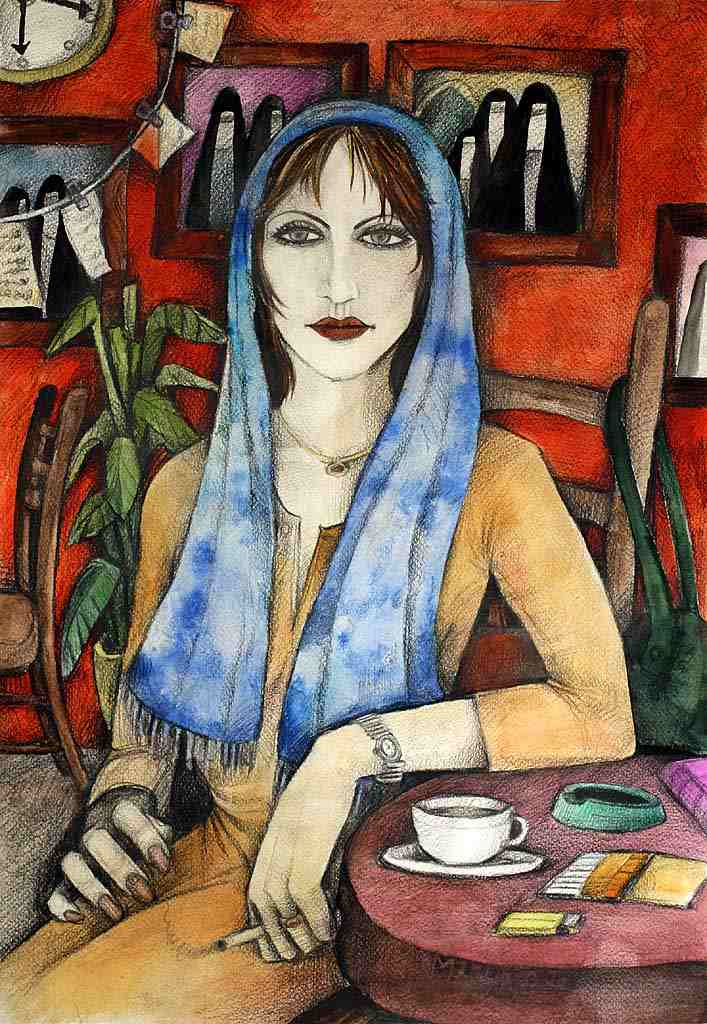
- Tehrani Girl by Maryam Hashemi
- Born: Maryam Sandjari; 1977 (age 48–49)
- Education: Islamic Azad University
- Known for: Painting
- Website: http://www.maryamhashemi.com

Maryam Hashemi (Persian: مریم هاشمی, born 1977) is an Iranian visual artist based at Hackney Wick in East London. Often working in pencil, watercolour or acrylic paint.

== Biography ==
Hashemi grew up in Tehran. She graduated from Islamic Azad University in 2001 with a degree in Graphic Design and has been living in the UK since 2002. She is a figurative painter, currently working in the Magical Realist style but some of her works are closer to Surrealism. Her subjects are mostly women and recently many of her works are in the form of self-portraits. She has been known for her works in watercolors and pencil, but her recent works are also produced with acrylic on canvas, recreations and installation.

She has been exhibiting in many museums and art centres including the London Canal Museum, Watermans Arts Centre, The Broadway and artsdepot.

She has been featured on TV and radio shows including BBC2 Making Art, and has been part of many festivals including Edinburgh Iranian Festival, London Persian-English Theatre Festival and Hackney WickED.
