= Farida A. Wiley =

American naturalist, ornithologist, botanist (1887-1927)

Farida Anna Wiley (1889-1986) was an American naturalist, ornithologist and educator who worked with the American Museum of Natural History in New York City. Wiley was known for her 7 am walking tours and natural science field trips of Central Park and Greater New York, and was an author, illustrator, teacher and historian.

== Early life ==
Wiley was born in Orange Township, Shelby County, Ohio in 1889. The Wiley family was among the earliest white families to settle in this part of Ohio and Farida's father, Johnson Crozier Wiley, farmed acres next to those of his own father. In addition to crop farming, the family sold Percheron work horses to other farmers in the area.<Oral history within the Wiley family and, despite other speculation, there is no family story of Wiley travel to France to buy horses>. Farida was a unique name in the Midwest and the oral tradition of the Wiley family is that Farida was named for the "wife of a Greek student" at Xenia Theological Seminary which was then nearby in Ohio, associated with the Presbyterian Church and the church of both of Farida's parents<Written comments of Dora Jane (Wiley) Key>. The oral tradition in the Wiley family is that Farida began mailing in survey reports to a department of the U.S. government of her bird sightings on her family farm when still a young girl. Farida Wiley had an older sister named Bessie, with whom she moved to New York City after the death of her parents and Bessie's subsequent marriage in 1905 to (George) Clyde Fisher, also from a farming family in Shelby County, Ohio. Clyde Fisher later became a curator at the American Museum of Natural History and eventually the head of the Hayden Planetarium.

== Career ==
Wiley was known as a self-made expert having received only a high school diploma. Her first job in New York City was as a part-time botany teacher for blind children at the Museum of Natural History. Apart from teaching children, Wiley led 7 am tours in and around New York City. Her focus was on local birds, plants and animals. These outings were frequented by upper-middle-class women, mainly housewives, and cost between fifty cents and a dollar to attend. In the summer, Wiley conducted botany courses at the Audubon camp in Damariscotta, Maine. These courses were also frequented by holidaying New Yorkers, with women comprising the majority of her field study classes.

Wiley continued to have an illustrious career at the American Museum of Natural History. By 1936, she had risen to become the Director of Field Courses in Natural History and the Director of Nature Study Courses for City Teachers. In 1948, she became the Director of Field and Laboratory Courses in Natural Science. At the time, the museum was the center of natural science education and outreach, a role that has since been taken over by academic institutions. Wiley's role, therefore, was pivotal both in an educational and curatorial standpoint.

Outside of her work at the American Museum of Natural History, Wiley authored a field guide in 1936, Ferns of Northeastern United States, which she co-illustrated. She described the pocket handbook as one that could be "conveniently carried on jaunts in the field." The book contained all known species of ferns at the time, with detailed remarks on those that were commonly confused. While many of the specimens were studied in the wild, likely on her summer trips, Wiley also took help from the Brooklyn Botanic Garden and the New York City Botanical Gardens. By popular demand, the guide printed a second edition in 1948, with an addendum about fern cross-sectional patterns. Both editions of Ferns were indexed using Linnaean taxonomy and observational characteristics, displaying Wiley's technical and descriptive prowess.

In 1955, Wiley edited Theodore Roosevelt's America: Selections From the Writings of the Oyster Bay Naturalist. Wiley had met Roosevelt once as a child, writing in her introduction "let us all remember with grateful thanks what is probably his greatest Presidential gift to us; millions of acres set aside for the conservation of our natural resources and the ideas engendered in the minds of out people that wise use of natural resources is a necessity for natural survival" Wiley invited Ethel Roosevelt Derby, Theodore Roosevelt's youngest daughter, and her personal friend, to write the foreword. The book was approved by the Roosevelt family and trust, with other American naturalists and essayists, such as Ambrose Flack, John Burroughs, Gifford Pinchot and Henry Fairfield penning essays for the project. By this time, Wiley was a Senior Director at the Museum, and had the connections to make such an undertaking possible.

== Legacy ==
Wiley was known for her prominent role as an educator. In 1953, she was awarded The American Museum of Natural History's silver medal, for over 50 years as a naturalist and teacher. She was in her eighties before she retired, working at the museum, retiring as an Honorary Associate in Natural Science Education. Despite being a skilled naturalist with an immense body of knowledge, Wiley commented "Most women don't have the strength or endurance for [expeditions]. But then, I myself never wanted to discover something. I've gotten my satisfaction from learning what others have discovered and teaching it". Self-effacing, Wiley mirrored the behaviors of many other 20th century female scientists. Other female museum directors, including Mary Louisa Duncan Putnam of the Davenport, Iowa Academy of Natural Sciences took a back seat when it came to claiming scientific aptitude.

Margaret Rossiter attributes this systemic behavior in part to the patriarchal academic society of the day. During Wiley's tenure at the American Museum of Natural History, the title of "scientist" was largely connected to doctorates, publications, and decades of instructional experience at a university. A middle-aged woman like Wiley may have found the bureaucratic and imposing world of academia tedious, and focused her efforts on public outreach, bringing many women, who otherwise would not have possessed the tools to understand the life sciences, into the fold.
