= Feride =

Feride (IPA: [ˈferide]) is a Turkish and Albanian feminine given name. Notable people with the name include:

- Feride Acar (born 1948), Turkish international expert on women and gender
- Feride Akgün (born 1973), Turkish former footballer
- Feride Akalan (born 2001), Turkish basketball player
- Feride Hilal Akın (born 1996), Turkish pop singer and songwriter
- Feride Bakır (born 1992), Turkish-German female football defender
- Feride Çetin (born 1980), Turkish actress
- Feride Hanımsultan (1847–1920), Ottoman princess
- Feride Kastrati (born 1993), Kosovar footballer
- Feride Rushiti (born 1970), Kosovan activist
