= Farida Haddouche =

Algerian politician (born 1959)

Farida Haddouche (born 1959 in Algiers) is a female politician in Algeria; she is Secretary General of the Front Party of National Liberation.
