= Mohsen Al-Hashemi =

Emirati footballer (born 1990)

Personal information
- Full name: Mohsen Mohammed Al-Hashemi
- Date of birth: 25 October 1990 (age 36)
- Place of birth: United Arab Emirates
- Height: 1.78 m (5 ft 10 in)
- Position: Goalkeeper

Youth career
- Al-Wahda

Senior career*
Years	Team	Apps	(Gls)
2010–2012	Al-Wahda		
2012–2018	Baniyas		
- * Club domestic league appearances and goals

Mohsen Al-Hashemi (Arabic: محسن الهاشمي; born 25 October 1990) is an Emirati footballer who plays as a goalkeeper, most recently for Baniyas.
