= Farida Yahya =

Nigerian entrepreneur

Farida Yahya Habu

President of Mandela Washington Fellowship Alumni Association of Nigeria.

Personal details
- Education: University of Maiduguri
- Occupation: Entrepreneur
- Profession: Biochemist & Author

Farida Yahya Habu is a Nigerian entrepreneur, author and is currently the president of Mandela Washington Fellowship Alumni Association of Nigeria.

== Early life and education ==
Farida was born in Borno State, Nigeria. She was raised in the staff quarters of the University of Maiduguri, where her family resided. She attended University of Maiduguri Primary School and later attended the Federal Government College Maiduguri. She holds a bachelor's degree in biochemistry at University of Maiduguri.

== Career ==
Farida began her career as a laboratory assistant at Dangote Flour Mills in Kano. She then founded Lumo Naturals specializing in natural hair care. She has been the lead tutor at The Brief Academy and served as a program coach at the Future Females Business School. Farida also holds positions as a Non-Executive Director at Republican Group, a Fellow of the Mandela Washington Fellowship program, the Vice President of Strategic Partnerships at Shecluded and a program coordinator at KSH Foundation.

Currently, she is the Head of Customer Development at Onetella, the Deputy National President, African Women Entrepreneurship Program AWEP, and the President of Mandela Washington Fellowship Alumni Association of Nigerian.

Farida authored Redefining Beautiful, a book chronicling her journey into the natural hair care business. It shares her lessons learned and business strategies used to grow her company, serving as a valuable resource for aspiring and existing business owners in that niche seeking scalability and guidance to avoid common pitfalls.
