= Farida Nabourema =

Togolese human rights activist and writer

Farida Bemba Nabourema
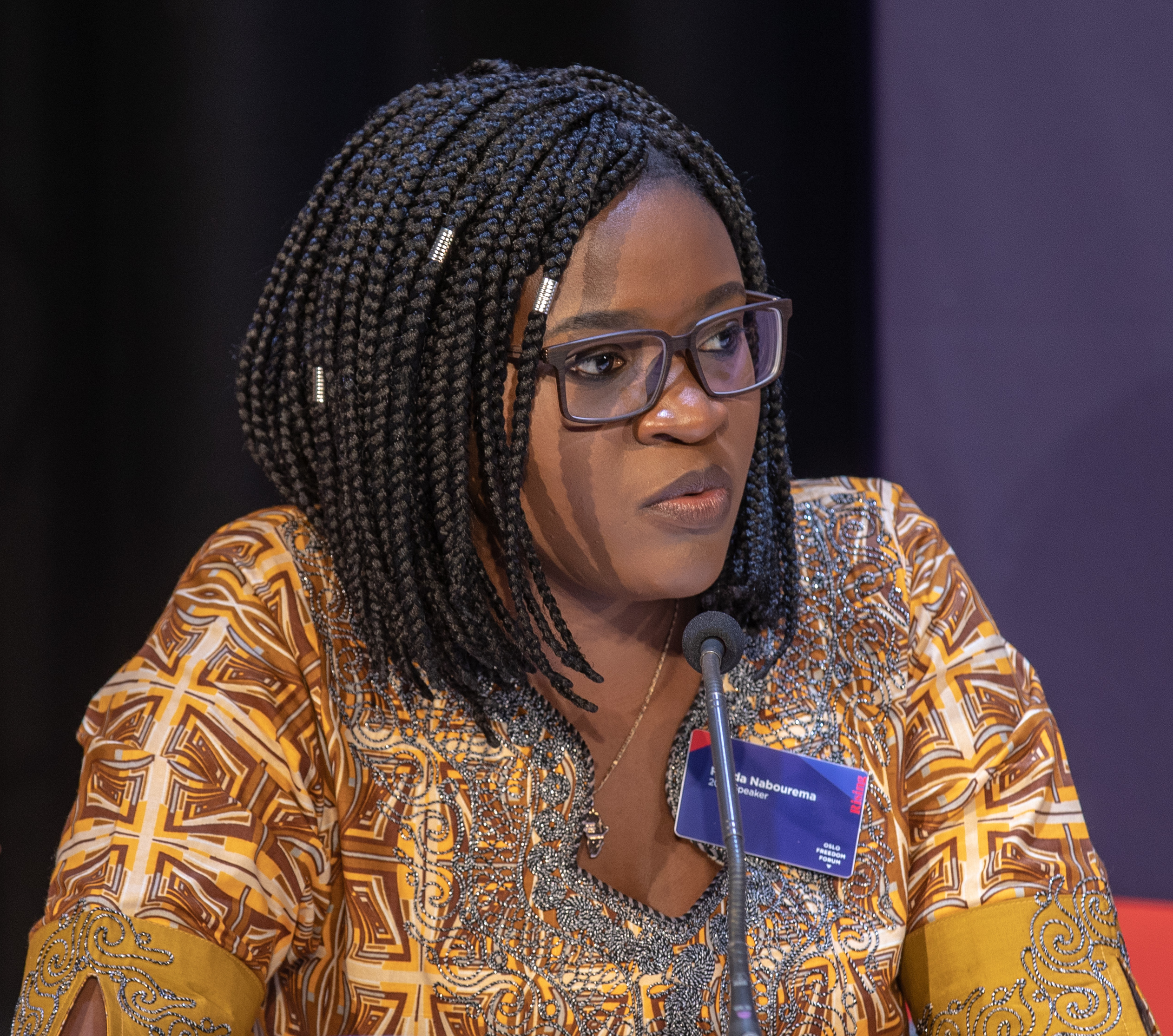
- Born: born 1990
- Citizenship: Togo
- Education: University of Lomé American University School of International Service in Washington, D.C.
- Alma mater: Studied history Studied international relations
- Occupations: Human rights activist & writer
- Organization: Faure Must Go
- Known for: Fighting for democracy in Togo since she was a teenager
- Father: Bemba Nabourema
- Awards: Advocate of the Year (Female) by the Africa Youth Awards.

Farida Bemba Nabourema (born 1990) is a Togolese human rights activist and writer who has fought for democracy in Togo since she was a teenager. When she was 20, she founded the "Faure Must Go" movement, calling for civil resistance in the interests of democracy. Published in 2014, her book of essays La Pression de l'Oppression (The Pressure of Oppression) encourages resistance from those who are oppressed. In 2017, Nabourema was recognized as "Advocate of the Year (Female)" by the Africa Youth Awards.

== Biography ==
Born on 19 April 1990 in Lomé, Farida Bemba Nabourema completed her school education with the baccalauréat in 2007, after which she studied history at the University of Lomé. She grew up under the oppressive regime of Gnassingbé Eyadéma until his death in 2005. He was succeeded by his son, the equally dictatorial Faure Gnassingbé. Farida Nabourema's father, the dissident Bemba Nabourema, was severely tortured in 2003 when she was only 13. As a result, she became a dissident herself.

== Early life ==
Farida Nabourema is a Togolese writer and blogger who began her career in activism when she was 13 years old.

When she was 18, she moved to the United States where she studied international relations at the American University School of International Service in Washington, D.C. Two years later she founded the "Faure Must Go" movement, organizing opposition to Faure Gnassingbé. It has since become the slogan of Togo's resistance movement.

Nabourema has been unable to return to her mother country as her life has been threatened. She now moves from country to country, maintaining her popular blog and calling for opposition to the Faure regime. She recently commented: "When I look at all the sacrifices that were made for us to get this far, from my grandfather's generation to my father's and now to mine, I am filled with gratitude and hope. ... Hope in a Togo where every citizen can aspire to become president without fear of retribution or death."
