= Farida Benyahia =

Algerian magistrate and president of the Council of State of Algeria

Farida Benyahia is an Algerian magistrate and president of the Council of State of Algeria.

She was appointed in 2019 by President Abdelmadjid Tebboune. After her installation as president of Council of State, she declared that she would go after loot funds and recover them.

== Career ==
Benyahia career began in 1975 holding positions including prosecutor at the court of Constantine, advisor to the president of chamber at the court of Constantine and adviser to the president of Council of State before being appointed President of the Council in 2019.
