= Sayed Rahmatullah Hashemi =

Afghan diplomat

Sayed Rahmatullah Hashemi سيد رحمت الله هاشمى
- Born: 1978 (age 46–47); Afghanistan
- Occupation: Diplomat

Sayed Rahmatullah Hashemi (Pashto: سيد رحمت الله هاشمى) is a former envoy of the Islamic Emirate of Afghanistan. He later attended Yale University as a non-degree student, but his application to the bachelor degree program was rejected after condemnation from American conservatives.

== Early life ==
Rahmatullah was born in 1978 in Afghanistan, to Pashtun parents. In mid 1980s, his family moved to Pakistan. Rahmatullah grew up in Pakistan and was educated in the Pakistani school system. His schooling was fragmented, but he did emerge proficient in English as well as Pashto, Persian, and Urdu.

In 1994, Rahmatullah worked as a computer operator and translator at the zonal sub-office of Afghanistan's Ministry of Foreign Affairs in Kandahar. He was appointed to the position of diplomat in the Afghan Embassy in Islamabad, Pakistan in 1998. In this capacity, he traveled around the world as an envoy of the Afghan Foreign Ministry of the Taliban regime. When top Taliban leaders were banned from foreign travel, Rahmatullah acted as representative of the regime on foreign visits.

== Yale attendance controversy ==
In 2004, an American friend, Mike Hoover—a CBS cameraman who had sponsored his 2001 trip—suggested applying to college in the US. In 2005, Rahmatullah was admitted to Yale as a non degree student. In 2006, conservative sentiment arose opposing Rahmatullah studying at Yale University and questioning outright his presence in the United States.

As of April 2006, Yale has published the following comment on its website:

Yale has allowed Mr. Hashemi to take courses for college credit in a part-time program that does not award Yale degrees... We hope that his courses help him understand the broader context for the conflicts around the world... According to the State Department, Ramatullah Hashemi was issued U.S. visas in 2004 and 2005, first on a tourist visa and then in 2005 on a student visa. The mandatory procedures were followed, which, in his case, included vetting through an interagency security clearance process. He was cleared by all agencies."

A recent non-scientific poll conducted by the Yale Herald—a student-run weekly newspaper—which was answered by 2,000 undergrads, concluded that 50% of Yale supported Hashmi's acceptance and about 25% opposed it.

In July 2006, Rahmatullah was denied admission to the Eli Whitney Students Program, Yale's degree-granting program for non-traditional students.
