= Persian astronomy =

Astronomy in ancient Persian history

Persian astronomy or Iranian astronomy refers to the astronomy in ancient Persian history.

== Pre-Islamic history ==
Ancient Persians celebrated the vernal equinox, summer solstice, autumnal equinox, and winter solstice through a variety of different festivals and traditions.

=== Vernal equinox ===
Nowruz is the day of the vernal equinox and the moment the Sun crosses the celestial equator has been calculated for years. Nowruz was an important day during the Achaemenid period and continued in importance through the Sasanian dynasty.

=== Summer solstice ===
Tirgan is an ancient Iranian festival celebrating the summer solstice.

=== Autumnal equinox ===
Mehregan is an ancient Zoroastrian and Persian festival celebrating the autumnal equinox since at least the 4th century BC.

=== Winter solstice ===
Yaldā Night is an ancient Iranian festival celebrating the winter solstice of the Northern Hemisphere.

=== Star systems ===
Some old Persian names in astronomy have barely survived; the names of the four Royal stars that were used by the Persians for almanacs are Aldebaran, Regulus, Antares and Fomalhaut, and are thought by scientists to equate to the modern-day star systems of Alcyone, Regulus, Albireo, and Bungula (Alpha Centauri) for almanacs.

=== Planets ===
Tablet inscriptions set forth observations of Jupiter from the 43rd year of the reign of Artaxerxes II to the thirteenth year of Alexander the Great. The positions of the planets throughout the year were determined using astrological charts.

== After Muslim conquests ==
After the Muslim conquest of Persia, much of Persian astronomy and astrology became intertwined with the astronomy in the medieval Islamic world, paving way for the Islamic Golden Age. Scientists translated studies in Sanskrit, Middle Persian, and Greek into Arabic, where the Indian Sanskrit and Persian Pahlavi (Middle Persian) sources taught medieval astronomers methods for calculating the position of heavenly bodies, and for creating tables recording the movement of the sun, the moon, and the five known planets.

The first major Muslim work of astronomy was Zij al-Sindhind by Persian mathematician al-Khwarizmi in 830. The work contains tables for the movements of the Sun, the moon and the five planets known at the time, and is significant as it introduced Ptolemaic concepts into Islamic sciences. This work also marks the turning point in Islamic astronomy. Hitherto, Muslim astronomers had adopted a primarily research approach to the field, translating works of others and learning already discovered knowledge. Al-Khwarizmi's work marked the beginning of nontraditional methods of study and calculations.
