= Ali ibn Sulayman al-Hashimi =

Arab astronomer and mathematician

- علي بن سليمان الهاشمي
- Born: fl. 890

Academic work
- Era: Islamic Golden Age
- Main interests: Astronomy, mathematics
- Notable works: Kitāb fīʿilal al‐zījāt ("Book of the Reasons Behind Astronomical Tables")

Ali ibn Sulayman al-Hashimi (Arabic: علي بن سليمان الهاشمي), known as al-Hashimi, was an Islamic astronomer and mathematician, who flourished during the late 9th century.

== Biography ==
No details of the 9th century Islamic astronomer Ali ibn Sulayman al-Hashimi's life are recorded, but he flourished in 890. As well as his work as an astronomer, he contributed to the development of irrational numbers.

== Kitāb fīʿilal al‐zījāt ==
Al-Hashimi's only known major work is the Kitāb fīʿilal al‐zījāt ("Book of the Reasons Behind Astronomical Tables"), which possibly dates from the late 9th century. It is a discussion of the astronomical ideas of the Greeks, Indians and Persians, which characterized Islamic astronomy before the arrival of the Ptolemaic tradition, and includes the basic theories underlying zījes, chronology, planetary cycles and equations, eclipses, timekeeping, and astrology.

The work lacks an organized structure or any critical comments about other astronomers, and is prone to technical errors made by al-Hashimi, as well as mistakes by later copyists. It may have been copied by scribes in Damascus in 1288.

Kitāb fīʿilal al‐zījāt is extant in a unique manuscript now preserved at the Bodleian Library, Oxford University (MS. Arch. Selden. A.11). The work has no innovative ideas, but is historically important, as it cites 14 works by other astronomers, most of which are lost, (Note: He provided commentaries on the following zījes: Ptolemy's Almagest, the Arjabhar, an Arabic translation of the Aryabhatiya by the Indian mathematician Aryabhata, the Zīj al‐Arkand, Indian astronomical tables which first reached Baghdad in the 8th century, the Zīj al‐jāmiʿ produced by Kushyar Gilani, the Zīj al‐Hazūr, compiled at Kandahar in Afghanistan, the Zīj al‐Shāh of Khosrow I, the Zīj al‐Shāh of Yazdigird III, the Zij as-Sindhind (translated by Ibrāhīm al-Fazārī and his son Muḥammad ibn Ibrāhīm al-Fazārī), the zīj of Yaʿqūb ibn Ṭāriq, the Zīj al‐Sindhind of Khwārizmī, the Mumtaḥan zīj of Yahya ibn Abi Mansur, two zījes of Habash al-Hasib al-Marwazi, and the Zīj al‐hazārāt of Abu Ma'shar al-Balkhi.) and thus provides information about the history of science. It has been translated by Fuad I. Haddad and Edward Stewart Kennedy.

== Sources ==
- King, David A. (1987). ""The Book of the Reasons Behind Astronomical Tables", by 'Ali ibn Sulayman al-Hashimi". Journal for the History of Astronomy. 18 (4). Chalfont St. Giles, UK: 284–286. doi:10.1177/002182868701800403. ISSN 0021-8286. S2CID 220911591.
- Rius, Mònica (2007). "Hāshimī: ʿAlī ibn Sulaymān al-Hāshimī". In Hockey, Thomas; et al. (eds.). Biographical Encyclopedia of Astronomers. Springer. doi:10.1007/978-0-387-30400-7_1433. ISBN 978-1-4419-9918-4.
