= Sayed Rahman Hashemi =

Afghan politician

- رحمان هاشمى

Chairman of Kabul's Provincial Council
- Incumbent
- Assumed office 2014

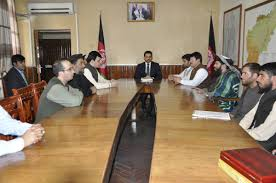
A session.

Sayed Rahman Hashemi (رحمان هاشمى) is an Afghan politician. He serves as the chairman of Kabul's Provincial Council since 2014.
