= Alaa Al Hashimi =

Iraqi politician (born 1953)

Alaa Al-Hashimy علاء الهاشمي

Iraqi Ambassador
- Incumbent
- Assumed office 2004-2020

Personal details
- Born: June 15, 1953 (age 72) Baghdad, Iraq

Alaa Majid Al-Hashimy (Arabic: علاء الهاشمي; born 1953) is an Iraqi politician. He served as the Iraqi ambassador in Germany, Japan, Spain, and Kuwait for over 15 years.

== Diplomatic work ==
Alaa Al-Hashimy was appointed to the "Iraqi Foreign Ministry" and served as:

- Former Iraqi ambassador to Germany
- Former Iraqi ambassador to Japan
- Former Iraqi ambassador to Spain
- Former Iraqi Ambassador to Kuwait
