= Sayed Zafar Hashemi =

Afghan-American politician

Zafar Hashemi
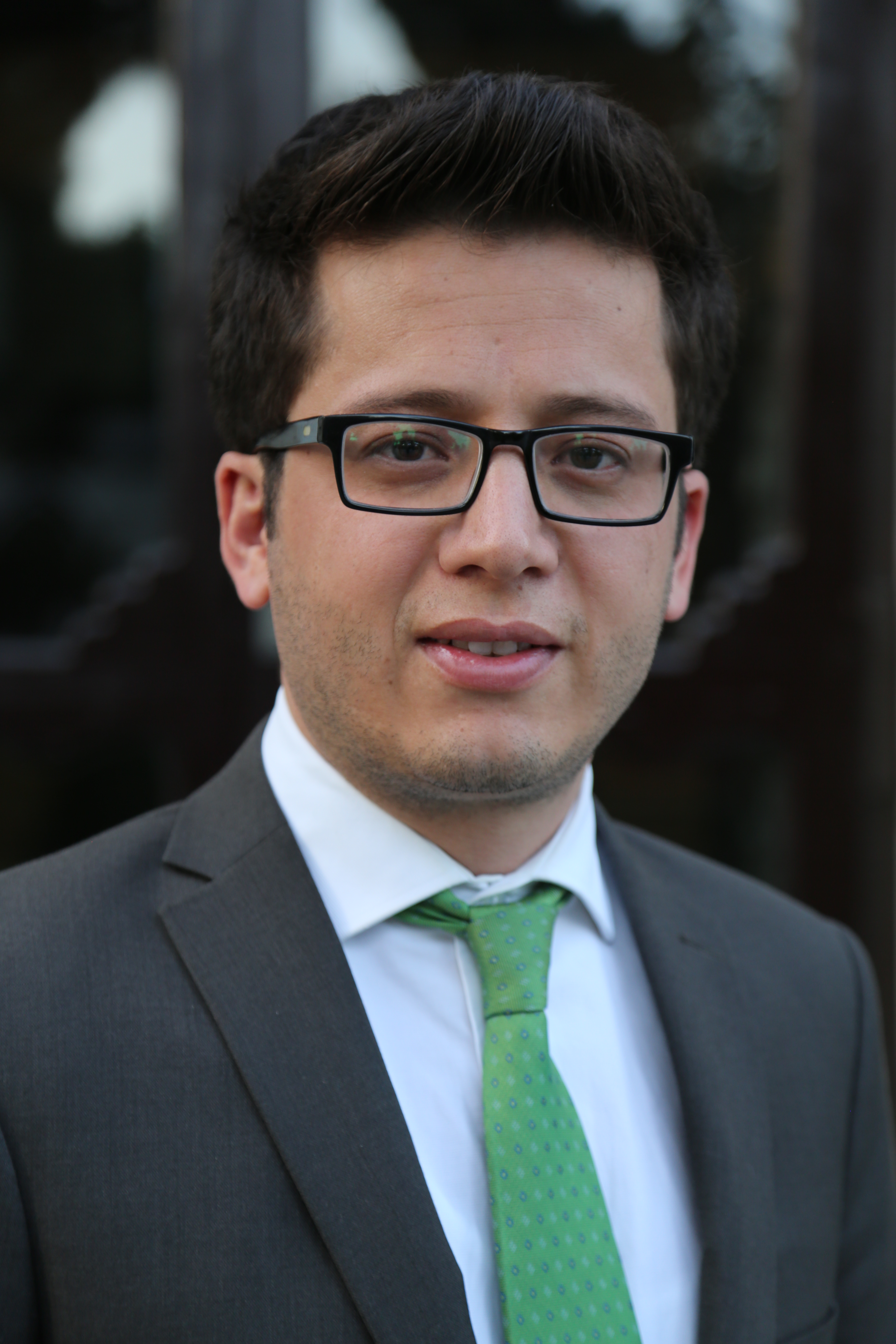
- Zafar Hashemi at the Presidential Palace, Arg

Deputy spokesperson of the Government of Afghanistan
- In office 27 May 2015 – 31 January 2017
- President: Ashraf Ghani
- Preceded by: Aimal Faizi

Personal details
- Born: February 17, 1985 (age 41) Afghanistan
- Party: Independent
- Education: University of Maryland; Johns Hopkins University

Zafar Hashemi (Persian: ظفر هاشمی; born February 17, 1985) is an Afghan-American who served as special advisor on Afghanistan for the Special Inspector General for Afghanistan Reconstruction (SIGAR). He now works as public relations officer at the U.S. Department of State. Previously, he worked as the political counselor at the embassy of Afghanistan in Washington, D.C. He was also the deputy (and for nine months acting) spokesperson of the President of Afghanistan, Ashraf Ghani until January 2017.

== Life and career ==
An ethnic Tajik, Hashemi fled Afghanistan as a child to Pakistan during the Taliban regime. He later resided in the U.S. to study, achieving a bachelor's degree in political science at the University of Maryland and a master's degree in public administration at Johns Hopkins University. Before immigrating to the United States in 2007, Hashemi managed communication and public affairs of Afghanistan Stabilization Program (ASP) under the Interior Ministry, and prior to that he was a journalist and a radio presenter for Nawa 103.1 FM in 2007, and later at AWAZ. He later became a television presenter and journalist at Voice of America (VOA) in Washington DC.
