= Farida Karodia =

South African writer

Farida Karodia (born 1942) is a South African novelist and short-story writer.

== Biography ==
Farida Karoida was born in the eastern Cape province, a location that inspired the setting for her first novel, Daughters of Twilight (1986). She taught in Johannesburg, South Africa, Zambia, Swaziland. In 1968 the government of South Africa withdrew her passport. Facing forced internment in South Africa, she emigrated to Canada. She remained there, where she published her first novel and wrote in multiple mediums, including film, television, and CBC radio dramas. She returned to South Africa in 1994. She now works as a freelance writer and divides her time between Canada and South Africa.

Her first novel was Daughters of the Twilight was published in 1986, and was a runner up for the Fawcett Literature Prize. Although she was living in Canada at the time, the book concerns the difficulties non-whites faced in getting an education under apartheid. However by 1990 she had also written about Canada. Further during time spent in India in 1991 she wrote and filmed Midnight Embers. Her novel A Shattering of Silence (1993), set during the Mozambique civil war, follows Faith, the daughter of Canadian missionaries, after the murder of her parents. Against an African Sky and Other Stories (1994) was one of her first works after she returned to South Africa. In 2000, her novel Other Secrets was nominated for an IMPAC Dublin Award. Nor have her novels set in Africa focused only on South Africa. Boundaries (2003)focuses on the return of three women to a small South African town, Vlenterhoek.

== Critical reception ==
In Mythologies of Migration, Vocabularies of Indenture: Novels of the South Asian Diaspora in Africa, the Caribbean, and Asia-Pacific (2009), Mariam Pirbhal points out that Karodia's work has received more acclaim outside of both her home countries of Canada and South Africa. Daughters of Twilight, for instance, "did not receive the critical attention or acclaim it derives in Canada" while "it was nominated for the Fawcett Literature Prize in Great Britain" (78), and after "reworking [that novel] "as the first part of a three-part multigenerational saga entitled Other Secrets published by Penguin in 2000, [this] also received a prestigious nomination, the International IMPAC Dublin Literary Award, though it did not enjoy a long shelf-life in print" (78). Pirbhal points to both the difficulty of categorising Karodia and her work into neat racial and national categories as one of the strengths of her work, as well as a potential reason for the lack of popular and critical attention both receive in non-diasporic contexts. Karodia, she contends, is one of the "unique voices in African literature . . . [that] do not fully belong to a small minority of writers of European origin who speak from the historical centre [sic] of institutionalized power nor do they belong to the vast majority of indigenous African withers who speak form the cultural and political centre [sic] of the post-colonial condition. . . .What the in-between, or to use Karoida's titular phrase, 'twilight' atmosphere of these texts undermines is the diasporic community's sense of volatility in Africa as a twice-displaced people, that is, both in their historical displacement from the Indian subcontinent and in their status as a political and rival minority in the new land" (79).

Similarly, Ronit Frenkel in Reconsiderations: South African Indian Fiction and the Making of Race in Postcolonial Culture (2010) positions Karodia's work, in particular Other Secrets, as part of small group of South African literature offering "alternative narratives to the TRC [ Truth and Reconciliation Commission ], which reveal the 'ordinary' impact of apartheid in a way that the Commission did not" (112). For Frenkel, the story of the Mohammed family reveals "one of the 'secrets' that apartheid attempted to conceal . . . the number of people who fell between its systems of classification on one level or another. This precarious geographical existence reflects the racial make-up of the family itself, in which Meena, Yasmin, and their father, Abdul, are classified as India, while their mother, Delia, and grandmother, Nana, are classified as coloured. Apartheid history is filled with stories of families split apart by their differing racial classification" (114). Devarakshanam Govinden, too, lists Karodia as one of the "South African Indian women [who] have been part of this large company of South African writers engaging in a 'refusal of amnesia' . . .[by] undertaking the process of 'self-narration' that foregrounds some of those 'blanked-out areas' of South Africa's identity as a nation" (2).

== Works ==
=== Novels and short story collections ===
- Daughters of Twilight (1986)
- Coming Home and Other Stories (1988)
- A Shattering of Silence (1991)
- Against an African Sky (1994)
- Other Secrets (2000)
- Boundaries (2003)

=== Anthologies ===
- "The Red Velvet Dress" in Opening Spaces: An Anthology of Contemporary African Women's Writing (1999)
- "Crossmatch" in Story-Wallah: Short Fiction from South Asian Writers (2004) is reprinted from Against an African Sky
