= Farida Siddiqui =

Pakistani politician

Farida Ahmed Siddiqui (c.1937, Meerut - August 2013, Karachi) was a Pakistani religious scholar and Member of the National Assembly of Pakistan.

== Background ==
Siddiqui was born in Meerut, British India. She received a post-graduate degree from the University of Karachi in 1958. She was the younger sister of Shah Ahmad Noorani.

== Career ==
Siddiqui was the founder president of the Women Islamic Mission, and a member of the Anjuman-e-Tableegh-e-Islam and Islamic Mission Welfare. She was the author of several religious books. She was a former member of the National Assembly of Pakistan and she was also the only serving woman in the Council of Islamic Ideology before her death.

== Death ==
She died in Karachi at a private hospital after a long illness at the age of 76 in August 2013. She is survived by two sons and a daughter.
