= Muhammad al-Hashimi al-Tilimsani =

Algerian-Syrian saint (1881-1961)

Shaykh Muḥammad ibn Aḥmad ibn al-Hāshimī ibn ʿAbd al-Raḥmān al-Tilimsānī (Arabic: محمد الهاشمي التلمساني) (September 16, 1881 CE – December 19, 1961; Shawwāl 22, 1298 AH – Rajab 12, 1381 AH) was an Algerian (by birth) and Syrian (by residence) Sufi saint and scholar, considered by some to have been the “renewer (mujaddid) of religion” and also the Shaʿrānī of his time.

== Biography ==
Shaykh al-Hashimi was born to parents who traced their lineage back to Ḥasan ibn ‘Alī, in the town of Sabda, in the vicinity of Tlemcen. His father was a scholar and a judge. Shaykh al-Hashimi was the eldest of the siblings.

In 1911 CE, during Ramadan, 1329 AH, al-Hashimi emigrated with his Shaykh Muhammad ibn Yallas to Syria, fleeing the French colonial administration’s restrictions on traditional scholarship. They stayed in Damascus for a few days, but al-Hashimi was forced by the authorities to journey on to Turkey and stay in Adana for two years, after which he returned to Damascus and was reunited with his Shaykh, remaining in his company and making Damascus his abode for the rest of his life.

== Studies ==
Shaykh al-Hashimi studied the outward sciences with the following masters: the great scholar of ḥadīth Badr al-Dīn al-Ḥasanī, Shaykh Amīn Suwayd, Shaykh Jaʿfar al-Kattānī, Shaykh Najib Kīwān, Shaykh Tawfīq al-Ayyūbī, Shaykh Muḥammad al-ʿAṭṭār from whom he learned the principles of jurisprudence, and Shaykh Muḥammad ibn Yūsuf al-Kāfī from whom he learned Mālikī jurisprudence.

As for Sufism, he was first a disciple of Shaykh Muḥammad ibn Yallas, who authorised him to pass on the general litany (wird) of the Tariqa. After the death of Ibn Yallas in 1927 CE/1346 AH, when the famous Shaykh Aḥmad al-ʿAlāwī passed through Damascus on his way back from Mecca, he designated al-Hāshimī as his deputy in the Middle East. Shaykh al-Hāshimī would eventually become the representative par excellence of the ʿAlāwiyya in the Levant, with many of his disciples and spiritual descendants still teaching to this day, in the lineage of what came to be called the Shādhiliyya-Darqāwiyya-Hāshimiyya tariqa. Four of his main disciples went on to remarkable careers of their own: Shaykh Muḥammad al-Nabhān (1900–1972), Shaykh ʿAbd al-Qādir ʿĪsā (1918–1992), Shaykh Muḥammad Saʿīd al-Kurdī (1890–1972) and Shaykh ʿAbd al-Raḥmān al-Shāghūrī (1912–2004).

== Works ==
In his long teaching career, he published only nine titles that include didactic poems and small treatises of a few pages, dealing with only two disciplines: Sufism and scholastic theology (kalām).

- A Creed of the People of the Sunnah (ʿAqīda ahl al-sunna wa-naẓmuhā— a standard theological text in verse)
- Commentary on the Versification of A Creed of the People of the Sunnah
- The Key to Paradise (a commentary to A Creed of the People of the Sunnah)
- The Path of Felicity (on the meaning of the two testimonies of faith, set to verse)
- The Treatise of Comprehensive Research (on the wonders of creation and the Creator, written in answer to the challenge presented by modern education)
- Commentary on the “Chess of the Gnostics” (Sufi commentary on the Shaṭranj al-ʿĀrifīn attributed to Muḥyīddīn ibn ʿArabī)
- The Correct Solution (on Sufi discipleship)
- The Scattered Pearls, Responses to Ten Questions (on Sufism)
- Treatise on the Definitive and Just Word (on the unity of the Muslims)
