= Aimal Faizi =

Afghan journalist and columnist

Spokesperson of the Government of Afghanistan
- In office 9 October 2011 – 29 September 2014
- President: Hamid Karzai
- Preceded by: Wahid Omar
- Succeeded by: Sayed Zafar Hashemi

Personal details
- Born: 1979-1980 Kandahar Province, Afghanistan
- Party: Independent
- Education: Bordeaux Montaigne University

Aimal Faizi (Persian: Persian: ایمل فیضی) is an Afghan journalist and columnist, who served as the spokesperson of Afghanistan's President Hamid Karzai from 2011 to 2014. He was also the director of communications to the government.

== Biography ==
Faizi was born in Kandahar Province. He studied French at the Afghan-Franco school in Kabul, but fled the civil war in 1994. He went on to study journalism at the Bordeaux Montaigne University in France. Back in Afghanistan he worked at the state-run news agency Bakhtar and Radio Television Afghanistan (RTA), before being appointed as the president's spokesman after the resignation of Wahid Omar.

He held his post until the end of Karzai's government in September 2014, succeeded by Sayed Zafar Hashemi. Faizi continues to be Karzai's aide ever since. In 2015 he started writing articles for Al Jazeera English.
