= Farideh Hashemi =

Iranian politician (born 1939)

- فریده هاشمی
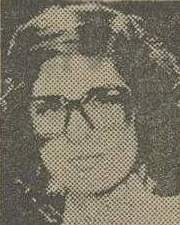
- Hashemi c. 1975

Member of Parliament for Sarab
- In office 1975–1979

Personal details
- Born: 1939 (age 86–87) Imperial State of Iran
- Party: Rastakhiz Party

Farideh Hashemi (Persian: فریده هاشمی; born 1939) is an Iranian politician who served in the Iranian Parliament from 1975 until 1979. A member of the Rastakhiz Party, she represented the city of Sarab.

== Biography ==
Farideh Hashemi was born in 1939 in Iran. Her father was named Abu Talib. She was employed by the Ministry of Culture and Arts as a middle school principal in the city of Sarab in East Azerbaijan.

Hashemi ran for the Iranian Parliament in the 1975 Iranian general election as a member of the Rastakhiz Party, the sole legal party. She was elected in the Sarab constituency, receiving 9,996 votes. Hashemi served in parliament until the Iranian Revolution in 1979. Following the revolution, her property was seized by the new government.
