= Chinese people in Egypt =

National group in Egypt

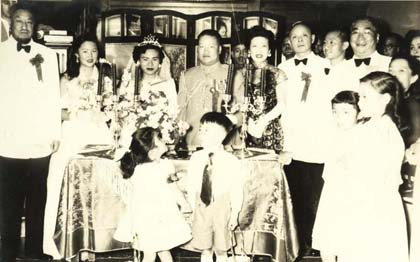

Total population
- 6,000–10,000 (2007)

Regions with significant populations
- Cairo · Alexandria

Related ethnic groups
- Overseas Chinese

Chinese people in Egypt form one of the smaller groups of overseas Chinese; however, they are a very diverse community with a history reaching back for over a century.

== Early history ==
Fatimid Caliph Al-Hakim bi-Amr Allah sent a delegation to Song dynasty China led by Domiyat.

The Mamluk Sultan of Egypt ordered Jidda to treat Chinese traders honorably upon their arrival in the early 15th century.

== Students ==
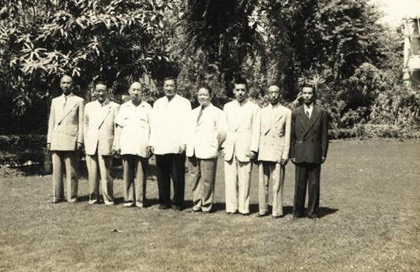
Republic of China Chinese muslim General Ma Bufang with his family in w:Egypt 1954.

Egypt, and specifically Cairo's Al-Azhar University, has long been an important destination for Chinese Muslims seeking Islamic learning. The earliest Chinese government-sponsored students to attend Al-Azhar were a group of four sent in 1931. However, individual Chinese scholars, such as Yusuf Ma Dexin, the first translator of the meanings of the Qur'an into Chinese, had been going to Al-Azhar on their own as early as the 19th century. The Republic of China (1912–49) sent Hui Muslims like Muhammad Ma Jian and other Hui Muslim students to study at Al-Azhar in Egypt. The Fuad Muslim Library in China was named after Fuad I of Egypt by the Chinese Muslim Ma Songting.

Imam Wang Jingzhai studied at Al-Azhar University in Egypt along with several other Chinese Muslim students, the first Chinese students in modern times to study in the Middle East. Wang recalled his experience teaching at madrassas in the provinces of Henan (Yu), Hebei (Ji), and Shandong (Lu) which were outside of the traditional stronghold of Muslim education in northwest China, and where the living conditions were poorer and the students had a much tougher time than the northwestern students. In 1931 China sent five students to study at Al-Azhar in Egypt, among them was Muhammad Ma Jian and they were the first Chinese to study at Al-Azhar. Na Zhong, a descendant of Nasr al-Din (Yunnan) was another one of the students sent to Al-Azhar in 1931, along with Zhang Ziren, Ma Jian, and Lin Zhongming.

A Hadith(圣训), (it is not a real Hadith but was a popular slogan among Arabic speakers in Middle East in the 19th-20th centuries. It spread to China via Hui Muslim students like Muhammad Ma Jian who studied at Al-Azhar in Egypt) a saying of Muhammad, spread to China, which says "Loving the Motherland is equivalent to loving the Faith" (traditional Chinese: 愛護祖國是屬於信仰的一部份; simplified Chinese: 爱护祖国是属于信仰的一部份; pinyin: àihù zǔguó shì shǔyú xìnyǎng de yī bùfèn) (Arabic: حب الوطن من الایمان ḥubb al-waṭan min al-imān).

Hui Muslim General Ma Bufang and his retinue including Ma Chengxiang moved to Egypt before being appointed as ambassador to Saudi Arabia. Exchanges were interrupted during the Cultural Revolution, but resumed in 1981; the group of ten sent from China to Al-Azhar that year included three Uyghurs, six Hui, and one Kazakh. By 1992, that number had reached thirty-four students, of whom twenty-eight were Uyghurs. As of 2006, there were about 300 international students from China in Egypt, of who the major portion were studying at Al-Azhar. China also provides scholarships to students at other universities, such as Cairo University; some students privately complain that the Chinese government prefers to sponsor those studying science and place various obstacles in the way of those studying religion.

== Migrant workers ==
Chinese construction companies began making inroads in Egypt in the early 1980s, soon after the reform and opening up of China's economy; they were able to underbid local construction companies by importing labourers from China, despite high unemployment in Egypt. Chinese workers have a reputation for being skillful, diligent, and efficient. Dru C. Gladney states that the number of Chinese construction workers in Egypt peaked between 1985 and 1987, at about 10,000 people, but declined again to around 5,000 by 1992. The number of Chinese workers in Egypt fluctuated significantly from in the 21st century. In 2021, the number is 5,020.

== Traders and entrepreneurs ==
Individual Chinese traders and entrepreneurs began arriving in Egypt in the late 1990s and early 2000s; they came largely from Zhejiang, Fujian, and the Northeast. They commonly open businesses in the restaurant, garment, and telecommunications sectors. Many of their restaurants serve Cantonese cuisine due to its popularity among Egyptians, though there are few migrants actually from Guangdong.

As of June 2008, the more than 500 Chinese companies in Egypt had invested a total of US$450 million of capital. Manufacturing products in Egypt allows them to take advantage of cheap local electricity and water, as well as local labour which may actually be cheaper than that of China in some sectors, such as garments.

== See also ==
- China–Egypt relations
- Chinese diaspora
- Immigration to Egypt
- Filipinos in Egypt
- Japanese people in Egypt
- Koreans in Egypt
- Malays in Egypt
