= Al-Bantani =

Arabic surname and diaspora group of Bantenese descent in Saudi Arabia

البنتني

Total population
- unknown; centuries of migration (primarily 19th to mid-20th century)

Regions with significant populations
- Hejaz and other regions in Arabian Peninsula

Languages
- Hejazi Arabic, Modern Standard Arabic, historically Banten Sundanese, Javanese, and Malay

Religion
- Sunni Islam

Related ethnic groups
- Bantenese • Indonesians in Saudi Arabia • Malays in Egypt

Al-Bantani (Arabic: البنتني) is an Arabic nisba (toponymic surname) used to denote individuals or a family lineage originating from Banten (former territory of the Banten Sultanate), a historical sultanate and modern province located on the western tip of Java, Indonesia. Similar to other foreign-origin family names in the Arabian Peninsula — such as Al-Balushi (from Balochistan), Al-Bukhari (from Bukhara), Al-Fadani (from Padang), Al-Batawi (from Batavia; present-day Jakarta) or Al-Felemban (from Palembang) — the surname identifies families of the Bantenese diaspora who migrated, permanently settled, and obtained citizenship in the Hejaz region of modern-day Saudi Arabia.

== Etymology ==
The surname is formed according to classical Arabic grammatical rules for the nisba, where the relative suffix -i (ّي) is appended to a geographical name to denote origin or belonging. When applied to Banten, the toponym is modified into Al-Bantani (البنتني), meaning "the person from or pertaining to Banten".

== History ==
=== Early Islamic ties and scholastic migration ===
The connection between Banten and the Arabian Peninsula began during the era of the Banten Sultanate in the 16th century, which established early maritime trading routes and religious networks with Mecca and Medina. By the 19th and early 20th centuries, this relationship grew into a massive waves of scholastic migration.

Thousands of students and pilgrims from the Dutch East Indies (present-day Indonesia) traveled to the Hejaz to study Islamic sciences. In Arabic records, this Southeast Asian scholastic community was collectively designated as the Jawi community. Within this network, scholars and students from Banten formed one of the most prominent and cohesive factions.

=== Permanent settlement and integration ===
Many Bantenese religious students chose to remain in the holy cities indefinitely after performing the Hajj, a practice known as muqim (resident). Over several generations, these families completely integrated into Hejazi society. They adopted Hejazi Arabic as their primary language, married into local families, and eventually received formal Saudi citizenship. To preserve their historical lineage while conforming to the tribal naming conventions of the Arabian Peninsula, they formally institutionalized "Al-Bantani" as an official family surname. Historians and diplomats note that descendants of the broader Indonesian diaspora, including the Al-Bantani, constitute a significant portion of the modern population in the city of Mecca.

== Notable people ==
- Nawawi al-Bantani (1813–1897) – a world-renowned Islamic jurist, exegit, and theologian who served as an Imam at the Masjid al-Haram in Mecca. He authored over 100 books in Arabic and was honored with the title Sayyid Ulama al-Hijaz (lit. 'Leader of the Hejaz Scholars').
- Asnawi al-Bantani (1850–1937) – an influential Islamic scholar, teacher, and anti-colonial figure who studied in Mecca for decades before returning to Java.
- Arsyad Thawil al-Bantani (1851–1934) – a Islamic scholar and Indonesian independence fighter who fought in the Geger Cilegon incident from 9 to 30 July 1888. He was a student of Nawawi al-Bantani.
- Abdul Hamid al-Bantani – a prominent 19th-century Hejazi religious teacher and scholar of Bantenese descent who taught at the prestigious halaqah circles within the Masjid al-Haram.
- Benten family of Saudi Arabia – a notable branch of the naturalized Bantenese diaspora in Saudi Arabia. While some branches retain the classical spelling "Al-Bantani", other integrated branches adapted the surname into modern Saudi bureaucracy as "Benten" (e.g., Muhammad Saleh Benten, the former Saudi Minister of Hajj and Umrah, belongs to the broader Jawi–Hejazi bureaucratic class that emerged from this diaspora).

== See also ==
- Bantenese people
- Banten Sultanate
- Banten
- Indonesians in Saudi Arabia
- Malays in Egypt
- Nisba (onomastics)
