= Indonesians in Saudi Arabia =

Indonesians in Saudi Arabia الاندونيسيين في السعودية
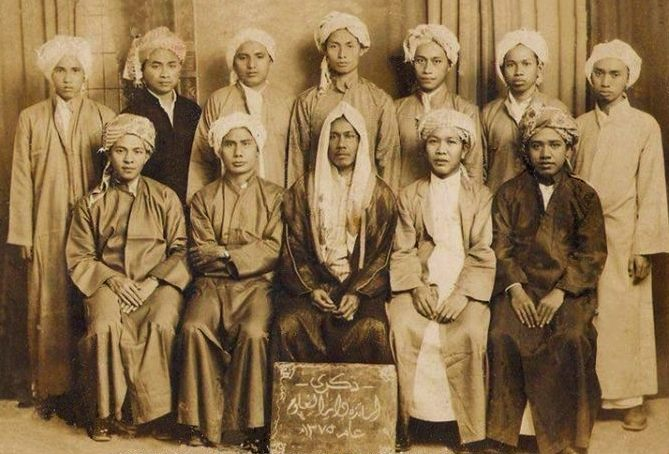
- Indonesian Islamic scholars in Makkah, 1955

Total population
- 1,500,000 (2019)(Indonesian ancestry) >610,000 (2018) (Indonesian citizen); 175,342 (2022) (Indonesian citizen in SA 2022 census); 857,613 (2024) (Indonesian citizen registered in KBRI)

Regions with significant populations
- Jeddah, Mecca, Madinah, Riyadh

Languages
- Indonesian, Arabic, Javanese

Religion
- Sunni Islam

Indonesians in Saudi Arabia consist largely of female domestic workers, with a minority of other types of labour migrants. As of 2018, an estimated 600,000 Indonesians (excluding Indonesian ancestry) were believed to be working in Saudi Arabia, comparable to the numbers of migrants are the groups from Bangladesh, India, Philippines and Pakistan, which number between 1 and 4 million people each.

A large number of Indonesian expatriates in Saudi Arabia also work in diplomatic sectors or are employees to local or foreign companies located in various provinces of Saudi Arabia such as Saudia Airlines, SABIC, Schlumberger, Halliburton, or Indomie. Many Indonesians are also employees of the world's biggest oil company Saudi Aramco with their families located in the Dhahran area. Most Indonesians in Saudi Arabia reside in Riyadh, Jeddah, Mecca, Medina, and all around Dammam area.

== History ==
The Indonesian government signed an agreement with Saudi Arabia and other Middle Eastern governments on manpower exports in 1983; in that year, 47,000 Indonesians went to Saudi Arabia. Their numbers grew rapidly; in the five years starting in 1989, Saudi Arabia took in a total of 384,822 Indonesian workers, accounting for 59% of all labour migration from Indonesia during that period. Indonesian domestic workers find themselves quite vulnerable to abuse and exploitation by labour brokers and their employers. The Indonesian government is reluctant to advocate very strongly on their behalf, for fear that the Saudi government might respond by cutting back on the number of visas issued to Indonesians performing the hajj. Ironically, Indonesian domestic workers typically find themselves unable to perform hajj or umrah during their stay in Saudi Arabia.

Recruiters seeking to hire Indonesian women to work in Saudi Arabia typically focus their efforts on pesantren (Islamic boarding schools) in rural areas. Pesantren students are likely to have learned some Arabic in the course of their religious studies, which eases their communication with their employers; Saudi Arabia as a destination is more likely to appeal to devout Muslims such as the typical students at these schools, and employers in Saudi Arabia are also more comfortable hiring Muslims. However, regardless of the religious bond, Saudi employers are often surprised that the Indonesian government allows unaccompanied women to travel and work overseas, unprotected by male relatives; they perceive the presence of Indonesian domestic workers in Saudi Arabia as representing a moral and economic failure on the part of the Indonesian government and the women's families.

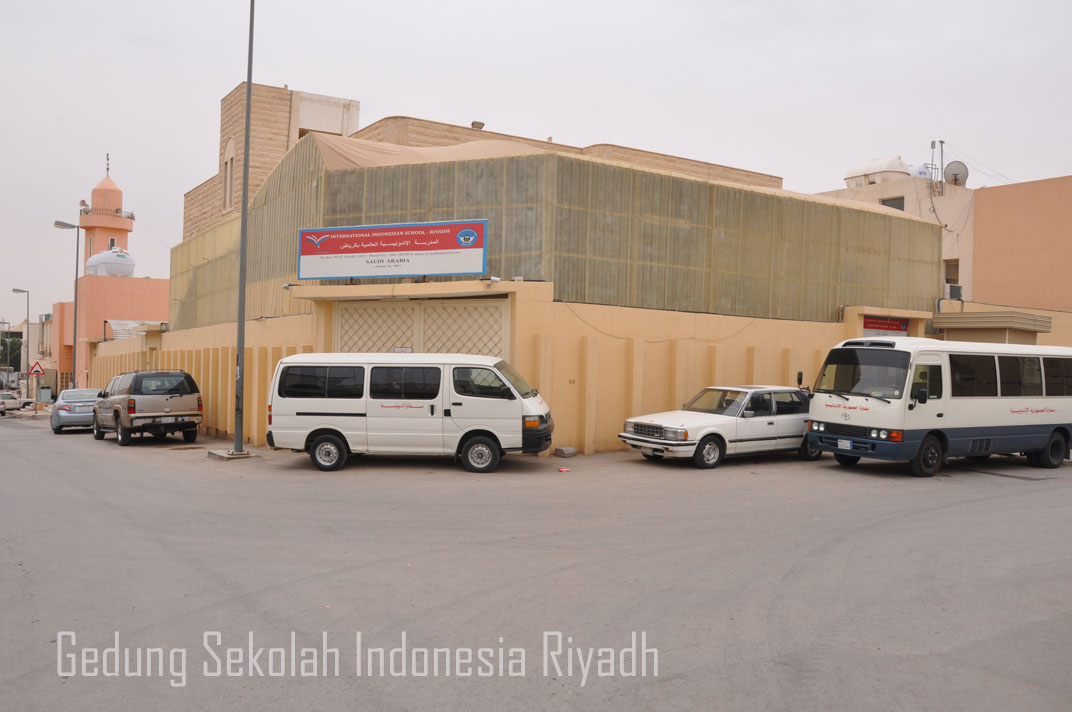
Indonesian Embassy School building in Riyadh

Roughly 39,000 Indonesians in Saudi Arabia registered to vote in Indonesia's 2004 presidential election through one of the 27 polling stations set up for them in the kingdom; they represented nearly half of all Indonesians in the Middle East who registered to vote.

Indonesian pilgrims have long lived in Hejaz, a region along the west coast of Saudi Arabia. Among them was Shaykh Ahmad Khatib Al-Minangkabawi, who was from Minangkabau origin in Sumatra. He served as the Imam and the scholar for the Shafi'i school of thought at the Grand Mosque in Mecca during the late 19th century. Most of the santris (Islamic boarding school pupils) from Indonesia also have continued to pursue their education in Saudi, such as in the Islamic University of Madinah and the Umm al-Qura University in Mecca.

== Saudis of Indonesian descent ==
There are Saudi citizens who reside in Mecca and Jeddah that are of Indonesian descent. Their forefathers came from Indonesia by sea during the late 19th century until the mid 20th century for pilgrimage, trade, and Islamic education purposes. Many of them did not return to their homeland thus they decided to stay in Saudi and their descendants have become Saudi citizens ever since. Many of them also married women who came from different parts of the Islamic world and stayed permanently in Saudi Arabia. Their descendants today are recognizable with their family name originating from their forefathers' origins back in Indonesia, such as "Bugis", "Banjar", "Batawi" (Betawi), "Al-Felemban" (Palembang), "Faden" (Padang), "Al-Bantani" (Banten), "Al-Minangkabawi" (Minangkabau), "Bawayan" (Bawean), and many more. One of them is Muhammad Saleh Benten, a Saudi politician appointed by King Salman as the Minister of Hajj and Umrah.

The former Indonesian Ambassador to Saudi Arabia, Gatot Abdullah Mansyur, stated that 50% of Mecca residents are of Indonesian descent. This has been possible because of trade between the two nations, since the era of the Rashidun Caliphate with the Malay Archipelago.

== See also ==
- Foreign workers in Saudi Arabia
- Indonesia–Saudi Arabia relations
- Migrant workers in the Gulf Cooperation Council region
- Overseas Indonesians
