= Cairo Japanese School =

- カイロ日本人学校 مدرسة القاهرة اليابانية

Location
- NAZLET EL BATRAN EL AHRAM GIZA, A.R.EGYPT; Giza; Egypt; 29.9744442°N 31.155054000000064°E

Information
- Type: Japanese international school
- Website: cjseg.jimdo.com

Cairo Japanese School (カイロ日本人学校, Kairo Nihonjin Gakkō; CJS; Arabic: مدرسة القاهرة اليابانية) is a Japanese international school located in Giza, Egypt in Greater Cairo. The school serves elementary and junior high school levels.

== History ==
The school was established in 1972. The current building in Giza, in proximity to the pyramids, opened in 1988. Kajima Company built the campus.

As of March 1, 2006, 53 students were enrolled.

By February 2011 the school had 28 students. Due to political unrest related to the Egyptian Revolution of 2011, the school closed temporarily and most of the students left Egypt. By July 2013 there were 33 students at the school. The school again closed temporarily due to political unrest related to the 2013 Egyptian coup d'état.

== Notable alumni ==
- Fairouz Ai, voice actress (elementary school)

== See also ==
- Japanese people in Egypt
- Egypt-Japan University of Science and Technology
