= Human trafficking in Saudi Arabia =

Saudi Arabia ratified the 2000 UN TIP Protocol in July 2007.

== Background in 2021 ==
With respect to human trafficking, Saudi Arabia was designated, together with Italy, Japan, Turkey, United Arab Emirates, Uruguay, Germany, Greece, Croatia, Israel, Iceland, Norway, and Angola, as a Tier 2 country by the United States Department of State in its 2021 Trafficking in Persons Report required by the Victims of Trafficking and Violence Protection Act of 2000 on which this article was originally based. Tier 2 countries are "countries whose governments do not fully comply with the TVPA’s minimum standards, but are making significant efforts to bring themselves into compliance with those standards". The 2021 report showed some effort by the Kingdom to address the problems, but continued to classify the Kingdom as a Tier 2 country.

The U.S. State Department's Office to Monitor and Combat Trafficking in Persons placed the country in "Tier 2 Watchlist" in 2017 and upgraded it to "Tier 2" in 2021.

The Government of Saudi Arabia does not fully meet the minimum standards for the elimination of trafficking but is making significant efforts to do so. The government demonstrated overall increasing efforts compared to the previous reporting period, considering the impact of the COVID-19 pandemic on its anti-trafficking capacity; therefore Saudi Arabia was upgraded to Tier 2. These efforts included reporting more investigations, prosecutions, and convictions overall, particularly for forced labor; implementing its national referral mechanism (NRM); and providing robust training on the mechanism, identification, and referral procedures across all government agencies.

The country remained at Tier 2 in 2023.

Saudi Arabia is historically a known destination for men and women from South East Asia and East Africa trafficked for the purpose of labor exploitation, and for children from Yemen, Afghanistan, and Africa for forced begging. Hundreds of thousands of low-skilled workers from Pakistan, India, Indonesia, the Philippines, Sri Lanka, Bangladesh, Ethiopia, Eritrea and Kenya migrate voluntarily to Saudi Arabia; some fall into conditions of involuntary servitude, suffering from physical and sexual abuse, non-payment or delayed payment of wages, the withholding of travel documents, restrictions on their freedom of movement and non-consensual contract alterations.

In 2021, Dawn MENA reported on the systematic abuse and persecution on Yemenite migrants in Saudi Arabia, including the forced expulsion back to Yemen during wartime. Amnesty International reported that migrant workers "who travelled to Saudi Arabia to work on the Riyadh Metro project were forced to pay exorbitant recruitment fees, worked in dangerous heat and earned pitiful wages during a decade of serious abuse".

== Prosecution of abusive Saudi Arabian employers ==
According to the 2022 Trafficking in Persons Report, the government maintained law enforcement efforts. The 2009 anti-trafficking law criminalized sex trafficking and labor trafficking and prescribed punishments of up to 15 years’ imprisonment, a fine or both; penalties increased under aggravating circumstances, including trafficking committed by an organized criminal group or against a woman, child, or person with disabilities. These penalties were sufficiently stringent; however, by allowing for a fine in lieu of imprisonment, the penalties for sex trafficking were not commensurate with those prescribed for other serious crimes such as kidnapping, false imprisonment, or sexual abuse. By the end of 2022, 30 abusive employers had been barred from hiring workers. The government provides training for police officers to recognize and handle cases of foreign worker abuse.

== Protection ==
The Saudi Ministry of Human Resources and Social Development operated shelters across the country for vulnerable populations and abuse victims, and it reported the government allocated approximately $6.67 million to specifically support trafficking victims during the year. The ministry operated shelters for child victims of forced begging in Mecca, Jeddah, Dammam, Medina, Qassim, and Abha, in addition to welfare centers for vulnerable female domestic workers and trafficking victims in 13 locations throughout the Kingdom. Each shelter provided accommodation, social services, health care, psychological counseling, education, and legal assistance. The Saudi government offered these services to all 173 victims it referred to care during 2022. Diplomats from labor-source countries had regular access to their nationals residing in government-run shelters and reported conditions and quality of services in the shelters varied slightly across the Kingdom but were overall satisfactory and safe. Some embassies and consulates—including those of Bangladesh, India, Indonesia, Nigeria, the Philippines, Sri Lanka, and Uganda - also operated shelters for their respective nationals. Foreign diplomats noted that Saudi officials frequently left potential trafficking victims at their respective embassies rather than referring them to Saudi shelters and noted that Saudi government shelters accepted only female domestic workers. The government did not have shelters to accommodate male victims or females from other employment sectors. The government demonstrated overall uneven efforts to protect trafficking victims. During 2022, the government identified 1,175 potential victims and referred 185 to government shelters for care. Of the 105 potential victims identified and referred to care by NGOs and international organizations, all were female foreign nationals, including 43 victims of forced labor, 60 victims of forced begging and "slavery-like practices", and two victims of sex trafficking. The victims were nationals of Bangladesh, Burkina Faso, Burma, Burundi, Egypt, Ethiopia, Ghana, India, Indonesia, Kenya, Kuwait, Lebanon, Morocco, Nepal, Nigeria, Pakistan, the Philippines, Saudi Arabia, Somalia, Sri Lanka, Sudan, Syria, Uganda, Vietnam, and Yemen.

== Prevention ==
Saudi Arabia's efforts to prevent trafficking include: distributing information at embassies abroad, licensing and regulating the activities of recruitment agencies, monitoring immigration patterns and visa issuance, and promoting awareness through the media and religious authorities. The government has begun working with UNICEF and the Yemeni Government to prevent trafficking of children for begging. A plan envisioned several years ago to distribute information to foreign workers at Saudi Arabian airports upon arrival has not been implemented. Religious leaders have preached sermons in mosques about the evil of abusing employees.

In 2008 Saudi controlled media mounted a public relations campaign advocating compassionate treatment of domestic employees and foreign workers. The campaign was controversial with critics complaining that it presented a negative view of Saudi behavior.

== See also ==
- Human rights in Saudi Arabia
- Slavery in Saudi Arabia
