= Indonesian Australians =

Australian citizens and residents of Indonesian origin

Orang Indonesia di Australia

Total population
- 87,075 (born in Indonesia, 2021)

Regions with significant populations
- Sydney, Melbourne, Perth, Brisbane, Adelaide, Cairns, Darwin, Christmas Island

Languages
- Indonesian, Chinese, English, Batak, Javanese, Other languages of Indonesia

Religion
- Christianity (majority); Islam, irreligion, Buddhism, Hinduism (minority)

Related ethnic groups
- Indonesians, Indonesian diaspora, Cocos Malays, Malaysian Australians, Singaporean Australians

Indonesian Australians (Indonesian: Orang Indonesia di Australia) are Australian citizens and residents of Indonesian origin. 85,798 Australian residents declared Indonesian ancestry on the 2021 census, while 87,025 stated they were born in Indonesia.

Due to the proximity of the two countries (they share a maritime border), Australia is a popular destination for Indonesian Expatriates, tourists and College students seeking exchange programs. Despite this, Australia's overall Indonesian diaspora is relatively small. According to the University of Melbourne, Australia is merely the 19th most popular destination for Indonesian migrants.

== Migration history ==
The number of permanent settlers arriving in Australia from Indonesia since 1991 (monthly)

People born in Indonesia as a percentage of the population in Sydney by postal area.

=== Pre-colonial era ===
As early as the 1750s, that is prior to European colonisation, seamen from eastern Indonesian ports such as Kupang and Makassar regularly visited Australia's northern coast, spending about four months per year there collecting trepang or sea cucumbers to trade with China.

=== Colonial period migration ===
Beginning in the 1870s, Indonesian workers were recruited to work in colonial Australia, with almost 1,000 (primarily in Western Australia and Queensland) residing in Australia by federation. The pearl hunting industry predominantly recruited workers from Kupang, and sugar plantations recruited migrant labourers from Java to work in Queensland.

Following federation and the enactment of the Immigration Restriction Act 1901, the first in a series of laws that collectively formed the White Australia policy, most of these migrants returned to Indonesia.

=== 1940s–1990s ===
Beginning in 1942, thousands of Indonesians fled the Japanese occupation of the Dutch East Indies and took refuge in Australia. Exact landing statistics were not kept due to the chaotic nature of their migration, but after the war, 3,768 repatriated to Indonesia on Australian government-provided ships.

In the 1950s, roughly 10,000 people from the former Dutch colony of the Dutch East Indies (Indonesia), who held Dutch citizenship and previously settled in the Netherlands, migrated to Australia, bypassing the White Australia policy. Large numbers of Chinese Indonesians began migrating to Australia in the late 1990s, fleeing the political and economic turmoil in the aftermath of the May 1998 riots and the subsequent fall of Suharto.

Between 1986 and 1996, the Indonesian-Australian community increased to 12,128. According to the Immigration Museum (Melbourne), many migrants were either students on temporary visas. However, other migrants came under either family reunion or skilled migration programs.

=== 21st century ===
In 2010, Scotts Head, New South Wales opened the first and only English-Indonesian bilingual school in Australia. As of 2016, the Indonesian-born population of Victoria was estimated to be 17,806. As of 2016, Australia is the single most popular destination for Indonesians seeking an undergraduate education abroad.

== Religion ==
Religion of Indonesian Australians (2021)
1. Christianity (52.6%)
2. Islam (19.3%)
3. No religion (11.2%)
4. Buddhism (10.4%)
5. Others (6.50%)
6. 0.00%
7. 0.00%

Though Islam is the majority religion in Indonesia, Muslims are the minority among Indonesians in Australia. In the 2006 Australian Census, only 8,656 out of 50,975 Indonesians in Australia, or 17%, identified as Muslim.

However, in the 2011 census, that figure rose to 12,241 or 19.4%. Indonesian communities in Australia generally lack their own mosques, but instead typically attend mosques established by members of other ethnic groups. In contrast, more than half of the Indonesian population in Australia follows Christianity, split evenly between the Roman Catholic Church and various Protestant denominations.

In 2016, 24.0% from Indonesian Australians population (73,217 people in 2016) identified as Catholic, 18.9% as Muslim, 10.0% as Buddhist, 9.2% as Atheist and 8.3% as Other Christian.

In 2021, 23.4% from Indonesian Australian population (87,075 people in 2021) identified as Catholic, 19.3% as Muslim, 11.2% as Atheist, 10.4% as Buddhist and 9.4% as Other Christian.

== Notable people ==
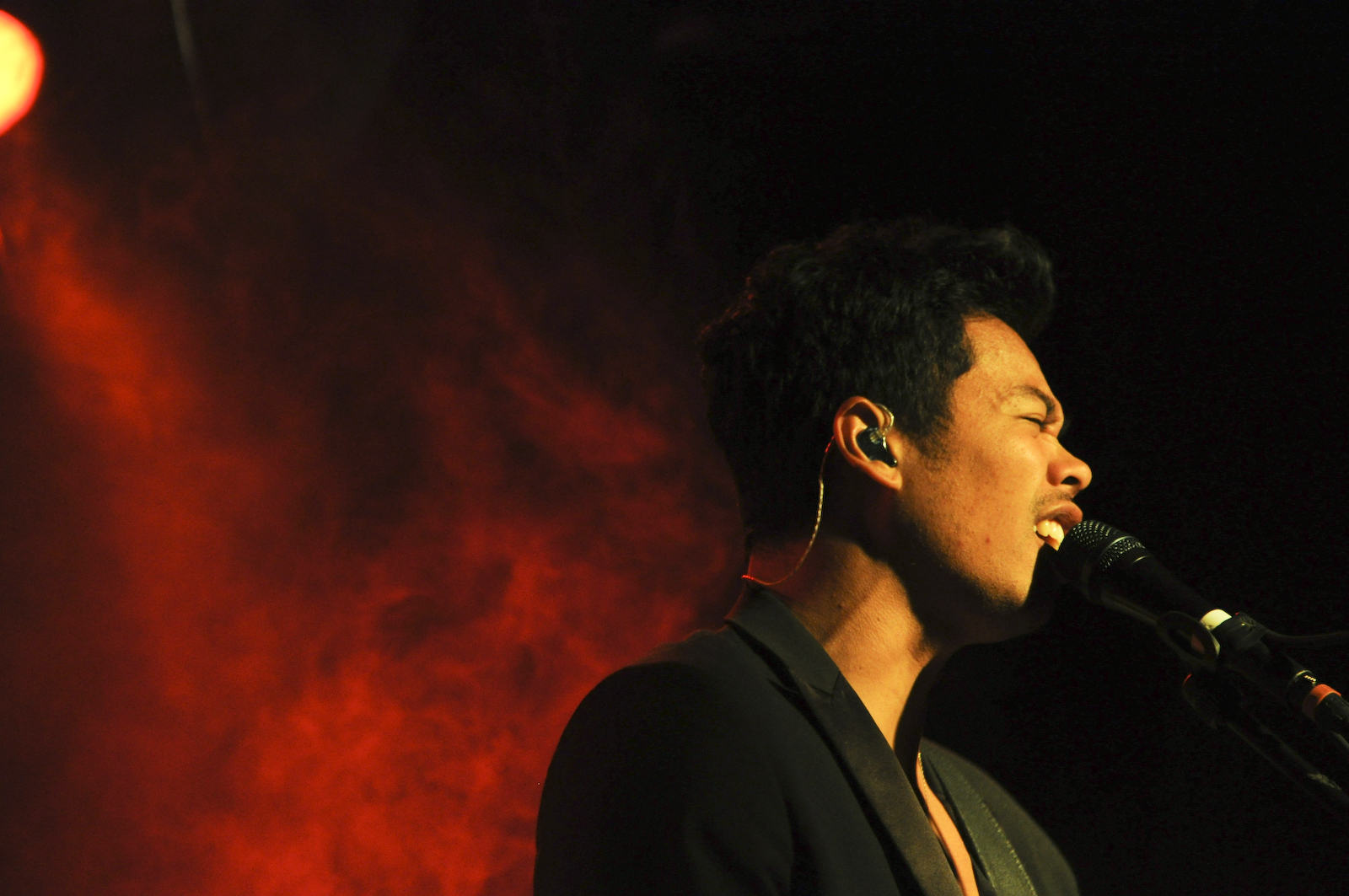
Dougy Mandagi of The Temper Trap

=== Artists and entertainers ===
- Jamie Aditya, singer, TV host and former MTV Asia VJ (Australian father and Indonesian mother)
- Andre Ong Carlesso, Indonesian-Australian actor known for Guilty, born in Bandung, Indonesia
- Lee Lin Chin, Australian broadcast personality (born to Chinese parents in Indonesia)
- Frederika Alexis Cull, Indonesian-Australian actress, model, Rugby union athlete, Puteri Indonesia 2019 winner (Miss Universe Indonesia 2019) and Top 10 Miss Universe 2019.
- Lindy Rama-Ellis, Australian model and entrepreneur. Born to Balinese royalty father and Australian mother.
- Jessica Mauboy, Australian singer, born to an immigrant father from Kefamenanu, West Timor and an indigenous Australian mother.
- Nadya Hutagalung, Singaporean-Indonesian-Australian MTV VJ (Indonesian father and Australian mother).
- Dougy Mandagi, Australian singer, frontman of The Temper Trap.
- Alin Sumarwata, Australian actress (Iranian mother, Indonesian father) married to actor Don Hany
- Tasia and Gracia Seger, winners of series 7 of My Kitchen Rules; now owners of Makan, a restaurant on Collins Street in Melbourne
- Reynold Poernomo, "Dessert King", contestant on MasterChef Australia (series 7); younger brother of MasterChef Indonesia judge Arnold Poernomo.
- Auskar Surbakti, presenter and correspondent at TRT World in Istanbul, previously with the Australian Broadcasting Corporation (ABC). Auskar won the 2011 Elizabeth O'Neill Journalism Award. Born to Karo Batak parents, Auskar is an abbreviation of "Australia–Karo".
- Steve Khouw, Australian Survivor contestant

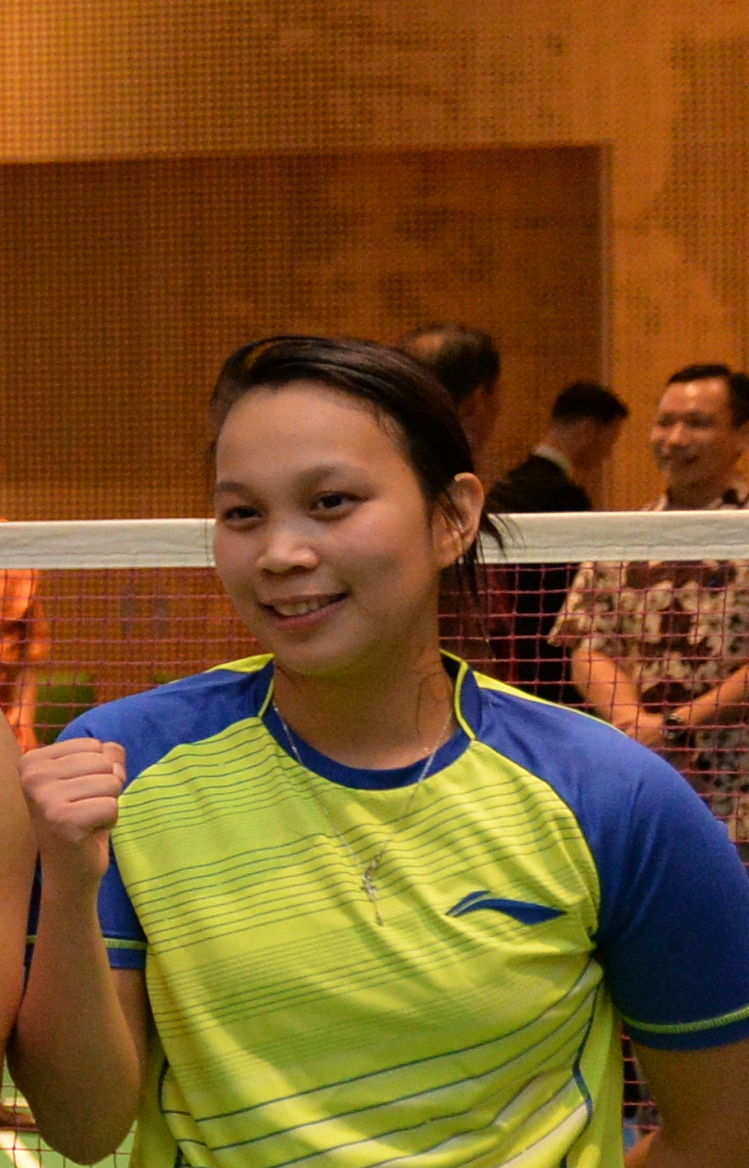
Indonesian-born badminton player Setyana Mapasa represented Australia at the 2020 Summer Olympics

=== Sports ===
- Adam Hollioake, Australia cricketer (Australian father and Indonesian mother)
- Ben Hollioake, Australian cricketer (Australian father and Indonesian mother)
- Massimo Luongo, Australian footballer with Queens Park Rangers (Italian father and Indonesian mother)
- Raul Isac, Australian Footballer (Timorese parents)
- Setyana Mapasa, Badminton player

=== Academics ===
- David Flint, Australian legal academic, known for his leadership of Australians for Constitutional Monarchy and for his tenure as head of the Australian Broadcasting Authority (Australian father and Indonesian-Dutch mother).
- Ariel Heryanto, sociologist
- James Mahmud Rice, Australian sociologist (American father and Indonesian mother).

=== Other notable Indonesian Australians ===
- Oodeen (later John O'Dean), 19th century Sydney Islamic community leader, interpreter at Northern Territory's Fort Wellington (1827–1829) and New South Wales court interpreter
- Annie O'Keefe (formerly Annie Maas Jacob), escaped from the Japanese on the Aru Islands to Australia in 1942. At the end of the Second World War, she successfully challenged the Australian Government in the High Court for her right to permanently reside in Australia bringing into question many aspects of the White Australia Policy.

== See also ==
- Australia–Indonesia relations
- Indonesian diaspora
- Immigration to Australia
- Indonesian New Zealanders
