= Indonesia–New Zealand relations =

- Indonesia: New Zealand

Diplomatic mission
- Indonesian Embassy, Wellington: New Zealand Embassy, Jakarta

Indonesia–New Zealand relations are foreign bilateral relations between Indonesia and New Zealand. Having common interests as democracies and neighbours in the Asia–Pacific region, New Zealand and Indonesia are viewed as natural partners. Both countries are members of APEC and EAS. Indonesia and New Zealand officially established diplomatic relations on 28 June 1958. New Zealand has an embassy in Jakarta, and Indonesia has an embassy in Wellington.

== History ==
=== Indonesian Revolution ===
While New Zealand took little interest in the Indonesian National Revolution, the First Labour Government did support British warnings against the first Dutch police action. It then supported its Australian counterpart's efforts to take the Indonesian dispute to the United Nations Security Council in 1947. Several members of the Victoria University College's Socialist Club, including the future Communist leader Ron Smith, also staged a public demonstration to condemn the Dutch police action in July 1947. New Zealand waterside workers also supported the Australian waterfront and trade unions' success boycott of Dutch shipping, which undermined the Dutch military effort to retake Indonesia.

New Zealand also supported the Indonesian Republic's efforts to gain associate membership of the proposed International Trade Organization and the United Nations Economic Commission for Asia and the Far East. The then-Acting Prime Minister, Walter Nash, also criticised the second Dutch police action as a violation of the Renville Agreement and suggested that truce violations should be referred to the Security Council. New Zealand also sent a representative to an Asian conference in Delhi, that had been convened by the Indian Prime Minister Jawaharlal Nehru, to discuss the Indonesian question.

=== Early foundations ===
On 17 February 1950, Prime Minister Sidney Holland formally recognised the Republic of Indonesia shortly after the Dutch transferred sovereignty to the new Indonesian Republic. However, due to the limited resources of New Zealand's Department of External Affairs, New Zealand did not establish a diplomatic mission until 1961. Instead, New Zealand's diplomatic and consular interests were represented by the British Embassy in Jakarta. While New Zealand had a Colombo Plan office in Jakarta, its functions were limited to coordinating New Zealand activities under the Plan and supporting New Zealand experts assigned to Indonesia. In February 1961, the Colombo Plan office was upgraded to that status of Consulate-General with Duncan Rae serving as Consul-General and later Charge d'Affairs. In January 1963, Prime Minister Keith Holyoake upgraded the mission to the status of legation. In return, the Indonesians accredited their embassy in Australia to New Zealand in 1958. Dr A.Y. Helmi served as the first Indonesian Minister to New Zealand.

When Indonesia joined the Colombo Plan in 1953, New Zealand quickly extended its Colombo Plan assistance to Indonesia. Under a technical assistance scheme, New Zealand sent experts to Indonesia while Indonesian trainees received training in New Zealand. New Zealand technical aid initiatives for Indonesia included the establishment of a technical trade training centre, short-term training courses for Indonesian dental nurses and dentists, the dispatch of New Zealand teachers to assist with English language teaching at teachers' colleges in Indonesia, and the construction of a Jakarta asbestos-cement board factory. New Zealand's Colombo Plan capital assistance was hampered by limited funds on the New Zealand side and limited technical expertise on the Indonesian side. By 1960, New Zealand had sent 29 experts to Indonesia while 99 Indonesians had been given scholarships for training in New Zealand.

==== Sukarno Era ====
New Zealand's relations with Indonesia during the Sukarno era were soured by Indonesia's dispute with the Netherlands over Western New Guinea; Indonesia claimed the territory as part of Indonesia while the Dutch wanted to prepare the Papuans for self-rule. Following the failure of Indonesia negotiations with the Dutch and efforts to rally support in the United Nations, President Sukarno embarked on a policy of "Confrontation" against the Netherlands over the disputed territory and successfully solicited Soviet military and political support which forced the United States to intervene as a mediator to bring about a political solution that favored Indonesia's interests. Following successful American and UN mediation efforts which culminated in the New York Agreement in 1962, the Dutch transferred West New Guinea to the United Nations Temporary Executive Authority, which then handed the territory over to the Indonesians in 1963. While New Zealand and Australia sided with the Netherlands in the United Nations General Assembly, they ultimately accepted the UN's decision to transfer West New Guinea to the Indonesians. Despite these policy differences, Indonesian officials like the Foreign Minister Subandrio recognised that Australia and New Zealand "were part of Asia".

During the Indonesian-Malaysian Confrontation (1963–1965), New Zealand supported Malaysia, the United Kingdom, and Australia due to its warm relationship with the pro-Western Malaysian government and its participation in the British-led Far East Strategic Reserve. President Sukarno, backed by the pro-Beijing Indonesian Communist Party, decided to pursue a policy of "confrontation" against Malaysia because he regarded the newly created Federation of Malaysia as a means of perpetuating British imperialism in Southeast Asia. Sukarno was also sympathetic to the Brunei People's Party's failed revolt in Brunei and was buoyed by the success of Indonesia's "confrontation" policy against Dutch New Guinea and the Philippines reviving its territorial claim to the Malaysian state of Sabah.

Throughout the Indonesian-Malaysian Confrontation, Indonesia waged an undeclared border war against Malaysia and sent armed parties on cross-border operations into the East Malaysian states of Sarawak and Sabah, which bordered Indonesia's Kalimantan provinces. In September 1964, Indonesian extended its infiltration operations to Peninsular Malaysia. New Zealand agreed to send its 1 RNZIR battalion, which was based in Peninsular Malaysia, to hunt down Indonesian infiltrators near Labis in the Malaysian state of Johor. In January 1965, significant New Zealand military forces—including the infantry battalion, a New Zealand Special Air Service detachment, two minesweepers, and two Bristol Freighters—were sent to Borneo. These served alongside British, Malaysian, and Australian forces and saw combat operations against both Indonesian regular and guerrilla forces.

Despite the political differences between the two countries, the two governments did not sever diplomatic relations. The New Zealand government continued its Colombo Plan assistance to Indonesia, albeit at a much-reduced level. While New Zealand Prime Minister Keith Holyoake regarded Indonesia's policy of Confrontation as misguided, he regarded New Zealand's Colombo Plan assistance scheme as a sign of goodwill towards the Indonesian people. In October 1965, an attempted coup d'état in Indonesia resulted in the mass killings of PKI members and supporters; altering Indonesia's political landscape. Between October 1965 and March 1967, General Suharto assumed many of President Sukarno's former powers; ultimately becoming the second President of Indonesia. In June 1966, Malaysia and Indonesia signed a peace agreement formally ending the Confrontation. These developments were welcomed by Holyoake as a step towards the full resumption of friendly contacts with Indonesia.

== Investment and Trade ==
Trade has been made even easier by the ASEAN Australia-New Zealand Free Trade Agreement, which came into force for New Zealand in December 2009 and at the start of 2012 for Indonesia. The deal will eliminate tariffs on all imported goods by 2020. Indonesia traditionally views New Zealand as an important partner in the Pacific alongside Australia, while for New Zealand, Indonesia is a strategic partner in Asia alongside China and India.

In 2016, New Zealand's exports to Indonesia reached NZ$843 million, while Indonesia's exports to New Zealand were at NZ$724 million. Total two-way trade for 12 months to June 2016 was NZ$1.567 billion. Indonesia was New Zealand's 13th largest trading partner for goods trade.

== See also ==
- Indonesian New Zealanders
