= China–Egypt relations =

Bilateral relations between China and Egypt

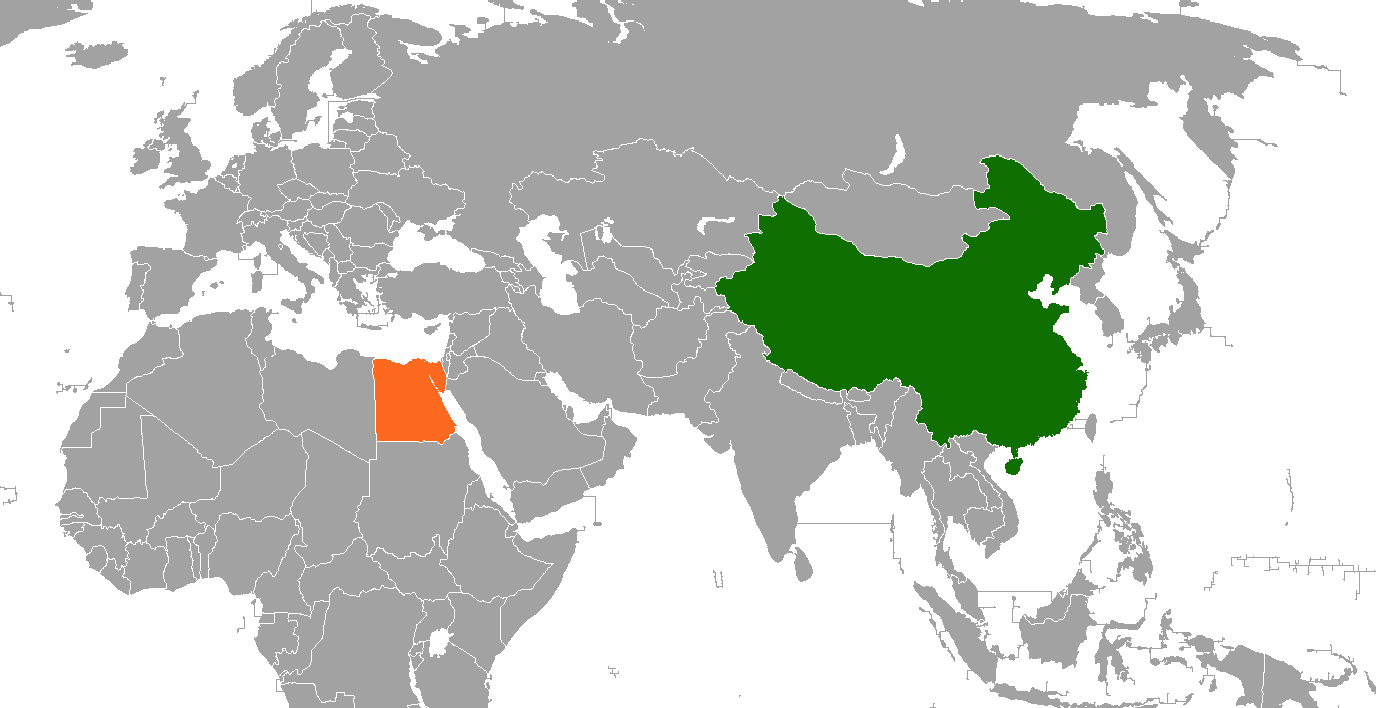
- China: Egypt

Diplomatic mission
- Embassy of China, Cairo: Embassy of Egypt, Beijing

Official diplomatic relations between the People's Republic of China (PRC) and Egypt were established on May 30, 1956. Early in the bilateral relationship, China viewed Egypt and Gamal Abdel Nasser as central to China's diplomacy in the region. Relations declined as a result of issues related to the intensifying China-Soviet rivalry and further declined following the Arab defeat in the Six-Day War. After Nasser's death in 1970, China made efforts to improve their relationship.

In 1999, the two countries signed a strategic partnership. They signed further cooperation agreements in 2006 and a comprehensive strategic partnership in 2014. China and Egypt collaborate in the Belt and Road Initiative, including through the establishment of a special economic zone in Egypt, and engage in space cooperation. In addition to their bilateral relationship, China and Egypt both collaborate in the multi-lateral cooperation forums the China-Arab States Cooperation Forum and the Forum on China-Africa Cooperation.

== History ==
Fatimid Caliph Al-Hakim bi-Amr Allah sent a delegation to Song dynasty China led by Domiyat.

The Mamluk Sultan of Egypt ordered Jidda to treat Chinese traders honorably upon their arrival in the early 15th century.

During the Qing dynasty, Yusuf Ma Dexin visited Egypt in the 1840s.

=== Republic of China ===
The Republic of China sent Hui Muslims like Muhammad Ma Jian and other Hui Muslim students to study at Al-Azhar in Egypt. The Fuad Muslim Library in China was named after Fuad I of Egypt by the Chinese Muslim Ma Songting.

Imam Wang Jingzhai studied at Al-Azhar University in Egypt along with several other Chinese Muslim students, the first Chinese students in modern times to study in the Middle East. Wang recalled his experience teaching at madrassas in the provinces of Henan (Yu), Hebei (Ji), and Shandong (Lu) which were outside of the traditional stronghold of Muslim education in northwest China, and where the living conditions were poorer and the students had a much tougher time than the northwestern students. In 1931 China sent five students to study at Al-Azhar in Egypt, among them was Muhammad Ma Jian and they were the first Chinese to study at Al-Azhar. Na Zhong, a descendant of Nasr al-Din (Yunnan) was another one of the students sent to Al-Azhar in 1931, along with Zhang Ziren, Ma Jian, and Lin Zhongming.

A False Hadith (圣训), a saying of the prophet Muhammad, spread to China, which says "Loving your country is part of loving the Faith" (traditional Chinese: 愛護祖國是屬於信仰的一部份; simplified Chinese: 爱护祖国是属于信仰的一部份; pinyin: àihù zǔguó shì shǔyú xìnyǎng de yī bùfèn; Arabic: حب الوطن من الایمان ḥubb al-waṭan min al-imān). It is not a real Hadith but was a popular slogan among Arabic speakers in Middle East in the 19th-20th centuries. It spread to China via Hui Muslim students like Muhammad Ma Jian who studied at Al-Azhar in Egypt.

Hui Muslim General Ma Bufang and his retinue including Ma Chengxiang moved to Egypt before being appointed as ambassador to Saudi Arabia.

=== People's Republic of China ===
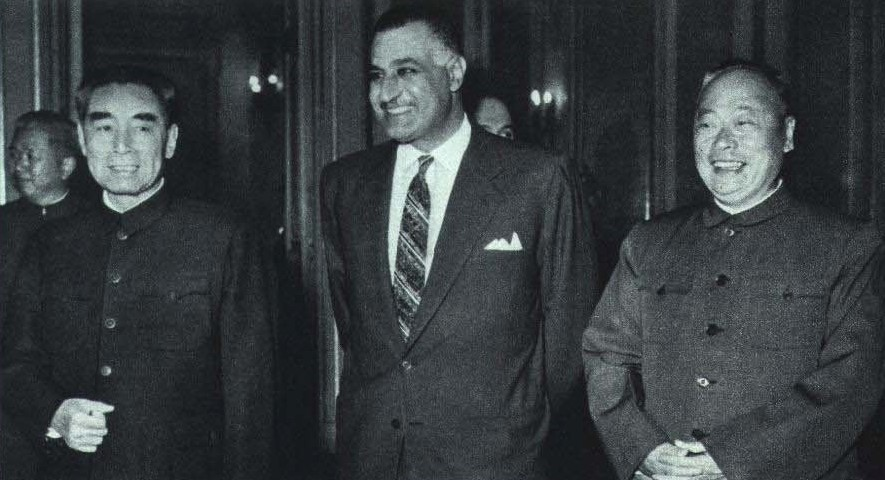
Nasser and Zhou, 1964

Chinese Premier Zhou Enlai first met Egyptian President Gamal Abdel Nasser at the Asian-African Conference in Bandung. On May 30, 1956, Nasser defied U.S. pressure and displeasure by recognizing People's Republic of China. The same year, China and Egypt entered into trade and cultural agreements. Zhou visited Egypt three times during his tenure. China initially viewed Egypt as the central country in the region for its relations and considered Nasser as important national-bourgeois leader.

During the Suez Crisis in 1956, China made strong statements in support of Egypt, condemned France and Britain, but avoided referencing Israel in its condemnations. As part of its show of support for Egypt, China stated that it would provide volunteers to help Egypt fight colonists; the Egyptian ambassador stated that Egypt had not asked for volunteers, and the idea was not raised again. China provided foreign aid to Egypt during the crisis, making Egypt the first Middle Eastern country to receive aid from China.

In 1958, China-Egypt relations became less close as the increasing Sino-Soviet rivalries resulted in disagreement with Nasser. Nasser's suppression of communists in Egypt also strained relations, as did his criticism of Abdul-Karim Qasim and the First Republic of Iraq, which China supported.

Bilateral relations also worsened after the Arab defeat in the Six-Day War. China unsuccessfully urged Nasser not to accept a ceasefire and instead to engage in a people's war. Nasser rejected the Chinese advice, stating that the United Arab Republic had lost its army and that continuing to fight would provide Israel with the opportunity to destroy Egypt. Nasser wrote to Mao that people's war was not a viable strategy for Egypt because "this is a desert, and we cannot wage a people's war in Sinai for the simple reason that it is unpopulated."

Relations further worsened in 1968. In February, China demanded that Egypt return a defector to China, which Egypt declined to do in the absence of an extradition treaty between the countries. In November, Egypt's foreign minister alleged that China's ambassador to Egypt was providing funds and printing facilities for students who were rioting in Alexandria.

After Nasser's death in October 1970, China sought to improve its relations with Egypt.

In 1971, Egypt supported China's bid for a permanent seat in the United Nations and it voted in favour to admit Beijing and replace Taipei.

China and Egypt signed a strategic partnership in 1999. The countries signed additional cooperation agreements in 2006.

In the aftermath of the Yom Kippur War, China provided Egypt with economic aid and food aid (100.000 tons of cereals) and military equipment. Egyptian government maintained cordial relations with China even after Nasser's successor, Anwar Sadat, broke with the USSR in favor of a partnership with the U.S., Hosni Mubarak first visited China in 1976 as vice president, during which he was received by Chairman of the Chinese Communist Party Mao Zedong and provision of spare parts for Egypt's Soviet-supplied Tupolev bombers and MIG fighters.

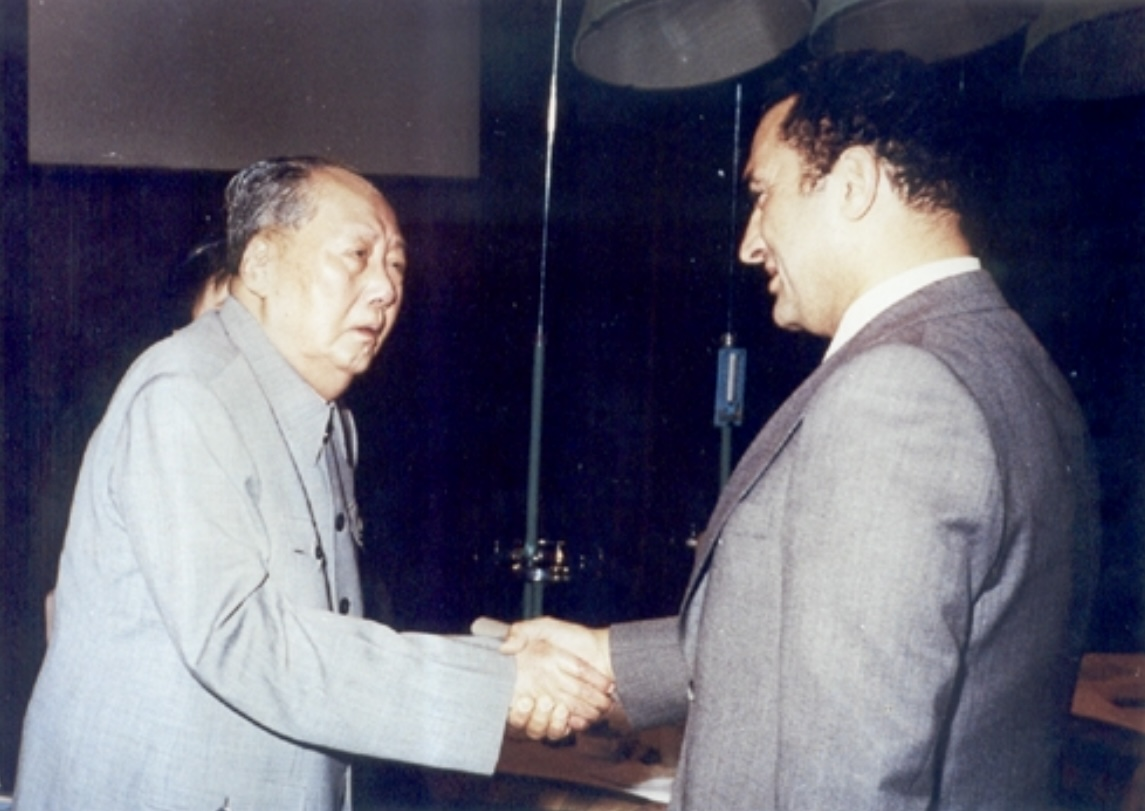
Egyptian Vice President Hosni Mubarak and CCP Chairman Mao Zedong, 1976

In 2012, Egyptian president Mohamed Morsi chose China for his first official visit outside the Middle East.

In 2014, the two countries signed a comprehensive strategic partnership.

General Secretary of the Chinese Communist Party Xi Jinping visited Egypt during his January 2016 state visit to the region.

Egypt follows the one China principle. It recognizes the People's Republic of China as the sole government of China and Taiwan as an integral part of China's territory, and supports all efforts by the PRC to "achieve national reunification". It also considers Hong Kong, Xinjiang and Tibet to be China's internal affairs.

In July 2019, UN ambassadors of 37 countries, including Egypt, have signed a joint letter to the UNHRC defending China's treatment of Uyghurs and other Muslim minority groups in the Xinjiang region. The letter also praised China's human rights achievements. Western media outlets reported that Egypt had aided in deporting Uyghurs to China; however, in July 2017, Al-Azhar, Egypt's leading Islamic institution, denied that any Uyghurs had been arrested from within its campus or other buildings belonging to the organization itself. In June 2020, Egypt was one of 53 countries that backed a statement supporting the Hong Kong national security law at the United Nations.

== Economic relations ==
Countries which signed cooperation documents related to the Belt and Road Initiative

Bilateral trade reached about $4 billion U.S. dollars in 2007, up from $3.19b in 2006. In 2010, it was worth US$7.0 billion. In 2011 Egypt was the 5th largest trading partner of China in Africa and in the first 8 months of 2012 it was the 4th.

From 2000 to 2012, there are approximately 39 Chinese official development finance projects identified in Egypt through various media reports. These projects range from jointly constructing an industrial park in the Northwest Suez Economic Zone beginning June 1, 2000, to the construction of a Chinese language school in Cairo in 2002 through a US$4 million grant from the Chinese government. In 2016, Egyptian president Elsisi made a visit to China and signed a number of deals there including New Administrative Capital of Egypt.

Egypt joined the Belt and Road Initiative (BRI) in 2016. China aligns its BRI economic cooperation in Egypt with the points of emphasis in Egypt's Vision 2030 national development plan. China's BRI projects with Egypt therefore focus on developing labor-intensive manufacturing and traditional infrastructure in Egypt.

In November 2020, Egypt and China signed a protocol of cooperation to utilise and market a land plot owned by the Suez Canal Authority in Ain Sokhna. The China-Egypt Suez Economic and Trade Cooperation Zone increased Chinese investment in, and industrial collaboration with, Egypt. It focuses on the production of textiles and garments and petroleum equipment as well as electronics and automobile assembly. This special economic zone (SEZ) is part of China and Egypt's Belt and Road Initiative (BRI) cooperation. Among the other SEZs established with Chinese cooperation in the Middle East and Africa, it is promoted by the Forum on China-Africa Cooperation (FOCAC).

Chinese tourists are one of the major source of income for Egypt's tourism. Egypt's tourism sector had significant growth in 2024, with a reported 65% rise in visitors from China, as stated by the Egyptian Tourism Authority. It is anticipated that more than 300,000 Chinese tourists travel to the country in 2024.

In addition to cooperation with China in the multi-lateral format of FOCAC, Egypt and China also cooperate through their membership in the China-Arab States Cooperation Forum (CASCF).

=== Energy ===
China National Petroleum Corporation (CNPC), a state-owned enterprise, provides services in Egypt. China Petroleum Corporation (SINOPEC), also a state-owned company, has facilities in Egypt.

=== Foreign aid ===
Egypt was the first Middle Eastern country to receive foreign aid from China.

From 2000 to 2014, Egypt was one the top recipients of Chinese foreign aid in the Middle East, receiving US$43 million.

== Military ==
1970–80s, China delivered B-6 bomber and F-6 fighter to Cairo and received several MiG-23 from Egypt. Egyptian navy received ships in the 1980s from China including submarines and frigates. China has also helped Egypt develop its own missile systems.

Egypt was one of the top Middle Eastern purchasers of Chinese conventional arms from 1978 to 2019.

The K-8E is an Egyptian variant of the Chinese Hongdu JL-8, exported as the Karakorum-8 (or K-8) to (among others) Pakistan, Zambia and Myanmar. The K-8E's manufacture at the Arab Organization for Industrialization (AOI) Aircraft Factory began in 2000, under an agreement between the AOI and CATIC, the Chinese state-owned aerospace manufacturer, to produce a total of 60 K-8s over five years. The contract, valued at US$347.4 million, was signed in 1999 in connection with the state visit by Chinese leader Jiang Zemin that year. Initially, most of the parts were manufactured in China and the aircraft were assembled in Egypt, but by the end of the programme the manufacture was to be carried out entirely at the AOI Aircraft Factory. It is located in Helwan. In May 2012 six Egyptian drones of ASN-209 was built in collaboration with a Chinese defence manufacturer during the first phase and are fully operational under the Egyptian armed forces according to Hamdy Weheba.

China and Egypt held first joint naval drills in June 2015.

In 2018, the Egyptian air force first publicly demonstrated its Chinese-made CAIG Wing Loong drones.

On 19 April 2025, Egypt and China held their first joint drill near the Israeli border. Additional joint air force exercises - namely fighter jet exercises - were conducted in May 2025.

== Education ==
Peking University has a long history of friendly cooperation with Cairo University. As early as 1986, the two universities signed an inter-school exchange agreement, after which they have completed the renewal of the Inter-school cooperation Agreement in year 2000. On 29 December 2007, the two sides signed an implementary agreement of establishing Confucius Institute through cooperation, and held a grand opening ceremony for the new institute, which had the honor of the attendance of Mr. Wu Chunhua Chinese Ambassador in Egypt, Mr. Ali Abd el-Rahman Yousef President of Cairo University, Mr. Zhang Guoyou Vice President of Peking University and other leaders. On 18 March 2008, the Confucius Institute in Cairo University---the first Confucius Institute established both in Egypt and North Africa—started its recruitment and Chinese language courses.

== Space cooperation ==
China provided Egypt's space program with grants in 2016 ($23 million), 2018 ($45 million), and 2019 ($72 million). China also cooperates with the Egyptian Space Agency in developing the Assembly and Integration Centre in Egypt's Space City.

== See also ==
- List of ambassadors of China to Egypt
