= Indonesian New Zealanders =

People group

Indonesian New Zealanders are New Zealand citizens and residents of Indonesian descent. As of 2013, approximately 4,914 Indonesians lived in New Zealand. In 2003, there were fewer than 3,300. Roughly 500 Chinese Indonesians fled to New Zealand after the mass violence directed against them during the Jakarta riots of May 1998 and the fall of Suharto; however, many were denied formal refugee status.

== See also ==
- Indonesia–New Zealand relations
- Indonesian diaspora
- Immigration to New Zealand
- Asian New Zealanders
- Indonesian Australians
