= Egypt–Japan relations =

- Egypt: Japan

Diplomatic mission
- Egyptian embassy, Tokyo: Japanese embassy, Cairo

Egypt–Japan relations are foreign relations between Egypt and Japan. Such relations are described by the Egyptian ambassador to Japan as a "very strong friendship", with embassies mutually established. At present, the two nations maintain a cordial relationship with strong economic and trade relations. Since the formal diplomatic relations were established, both countries have kept embassies in each other's capitals, demonstrating a dedication to continued communication and cooperation. Bilateral connections have been strengthened via a history of friendly exchanges and frequent visits between the two countries at different governmental levels. Their interactions are mostly shaped by their economic and trade ties, which include major Japanese investment in Egypt and a thriving exchange of goods and services. This economic involvement is backed by a variety of agreements that ease trade, protect investments, and promote mutual growth. Currently, Egypt and Japan have a friendly and cooperative relationship based on common interests and a commitment to regional stability and prosperity. This connection has grown to include considerable cultural exchanges and educational collaborations, strengthening the two countries' already strong ties.

== History ==
Egypt and Japan initially became in contact near the end of the Edo period. Significant early encounters include the arrival of the Second Japanese Embassy to Europe in Egypt in 1864 and Japan's fascination with Egypt's blended court system and the Ahmad Urabi Movement. After World War II, Egypt became a vital focus for Japan's Middle Eastern diplomacy as their contacts were restored and deepened.

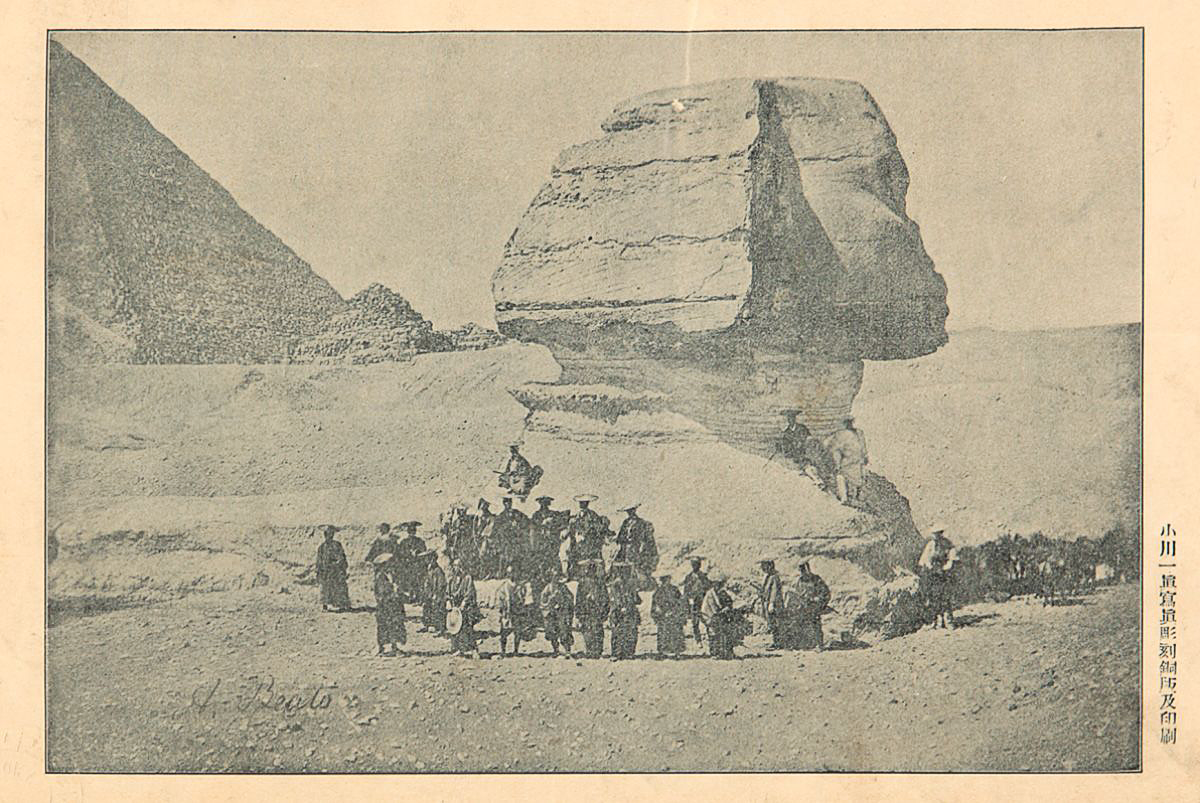
Members of the Ikeda Nagaoki's Japanese Mission to Europe in front of the Great Sphinx of Giza

Modern relations were established in 1922, when Japan recognized Egypt's independence. In 1945 the Egyptian government declared war on the Japanese Empire as part of the Allied war effort. With Egypt seen by Japan as a crucial ally for maintaining regional security and as a gateway to the Middle East, economic connections were reestablished in the 1950s and were characterized by substantial trade and investment flows. Since then, there has been a history of a cordial relationship, with several visits by senior diplomats and, most notably, visits by respective heads of state — in 1995, Japanese prime minister Tomiichi Murayama visited Egypt and former president Mubarak of Egypt has visited Japan on several occasions 1983, 1995, and 1999. This habit of visitation is maintained up to the present day, with the current president Abdel Fattah el-Sisi having visited Japan three times between the years of 2016 and 2020.

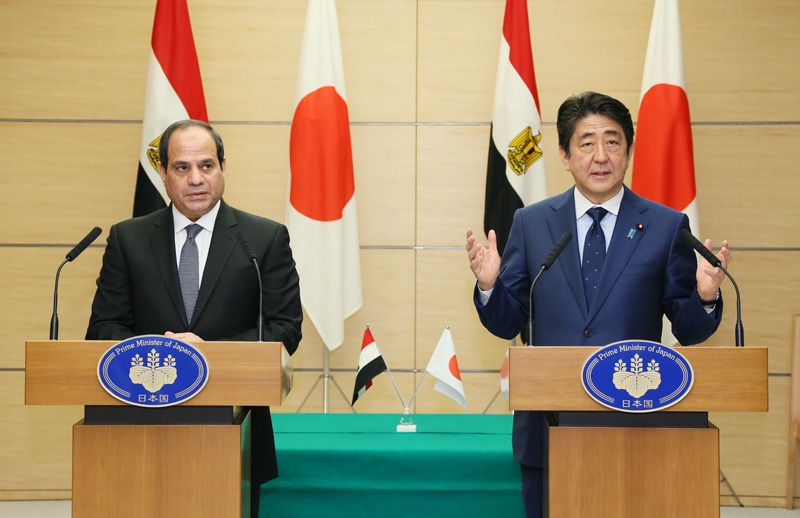
Shinzo Abe (right) with Abdel Fattah el-Sisi (left) at the Prime Minister's Office February, 2016.

Japan has been a major donor of aid to Egypt, and since the 1970s, Japanese Official Development Assistance (ODA) has played a critical role in Egypt's development. Japan's dedication to Egypt's progress is demonstrated by the various infrastructure projects and development programs that have benefited from this aid.

Mutual understanding has been strengthened by cultural and educational exchanges; Japan has established cultural organizations in Egypt and supported Japanese studies and language instruction. The evolution of educational collaboration is highlighted by recent initiatives like the Egypt-Japan Education Partnership (EJEP) and the founding of the Egypt-Japan University of Science and Technology (EJUST). Among the Middle Eastern nations, Egypt is among Japan's oldest friends.

== Diplomatic relations ==
Despite Egypt's challenges with the US between the 1950s and 1970s, Japan and Egypt maintained a close alliance. Egypt's shift towards the Soviet Union under Nasser (1956–1970) created tensions with the US, particularly on the Aswan High Dam project. Despite this, Japan persisted in fostering cordial ties with Egypt, perceiving it as a significant nation within the Third World.

Japan participated in the 1955 Bandung Asian-African Conference, which Nasser directed along with other international leaders. With the signing of the Cultural Agreement in 1957 and the Treaty for the Avoidance of Double Taxation in 1969, among other agreements and accords, Egypt became an even more important trading partner for Japan, which attributed Egypt's strategic location and the Suez Canal to its importance.

President Sadat (1970–1981) maintained cordial connections, particularly in the wake of the 1973 October War and the first oil crisis, which forced Japan to reconsider its Southwest Asia policy and solidify its relationships with specific nations, particularly Egypt.

During the Arab-Israeli war, Japan viewed Egypt as essential to maintaining regional stability and even offered financial support for the expansion of the Suez Canal. To support the expansion of commercial ties between the two nations, an Investment Protection Agreement was established in 1978. The strong bilateral relations during this period were emphasized by high-level trips, such as Prince Mikasa's to Egypt in 1975 and President Sadat's wife's to Japan in 1976.

Japan considers Egypt a key player in Southwest Asia and, as such, sees Egypt as a vital part of its diplomacy in the region. The two heads of government have been known to support each other on issues pertaining to the peace process in the Southwest Asia.

== Trade and Economic Relations ==
The bilateral relationship between Egypt and Japan is mostly not understood by mainstream Japanese scholars who specialize in diplomatic history and Middle Eastern studies. The 1950s saw the revival of Japan-Egypt's economic ties, which were particularly strengthened amid that country's high economic expansion. When Japanese businesses reestablished their international trade and business activities, Egypt served as the center of Southwest Asia. For the Japanese private sector, Egypt served as the primary gateway to the area. The mid-1970s saw a sharp rise in the number of Japanese residing in Egypt; the highest recorded figure was 1478 in 1978.

Moreover, Japan and Egypt signed agreements to strengthened the economic, commercial, and investment conditions. As of June 2021, Japan's tax treaty network actually covers only eight Southwest Asian nations (including Egypt) and three African countries. The Treaty for the Avoidance of Double Taxation was signed by both Egypt and Japan in 1969, further strengthening their relationships.

The volume of trade and Foreign Direct Investment (FDI) are also helpful indicators when considering the economic relationship between Japan and Egypt. Even though Egypt and Japan each have relatively small percentages of total foreign direct investment (FDI)—less than 1% for Japan and 1-2% for Egypt—there has been a consistent increase throughout the 2010s. Therefore, More foreign direct investment is anticipated in the future.

Egypt had a strong increase in Japanese exports in the 1980s, and since 2000, the trend has continued. While a significant portion of Egypt's trade is with its neighboring European and Arab nations because of the geographic reasons, Japan has historically accounted for a significant portion of trade among Asian nations for years. Egypt now accounts for over 10% of Japan's exports to the African Continent, making it a significant economic partner. Egypt imports mostly textiles and fossil fuels, while Japan export mostly cars and machinery to Egypt. Because of the Gulf countries' recent economic boom, Japanese businesses have been opening regional offices in places like Dubai and Doha. Despite this, As of December 2016, Fifty one Japanese businesses were still active in Egypt.

== Cultural and Educational Exchange ==
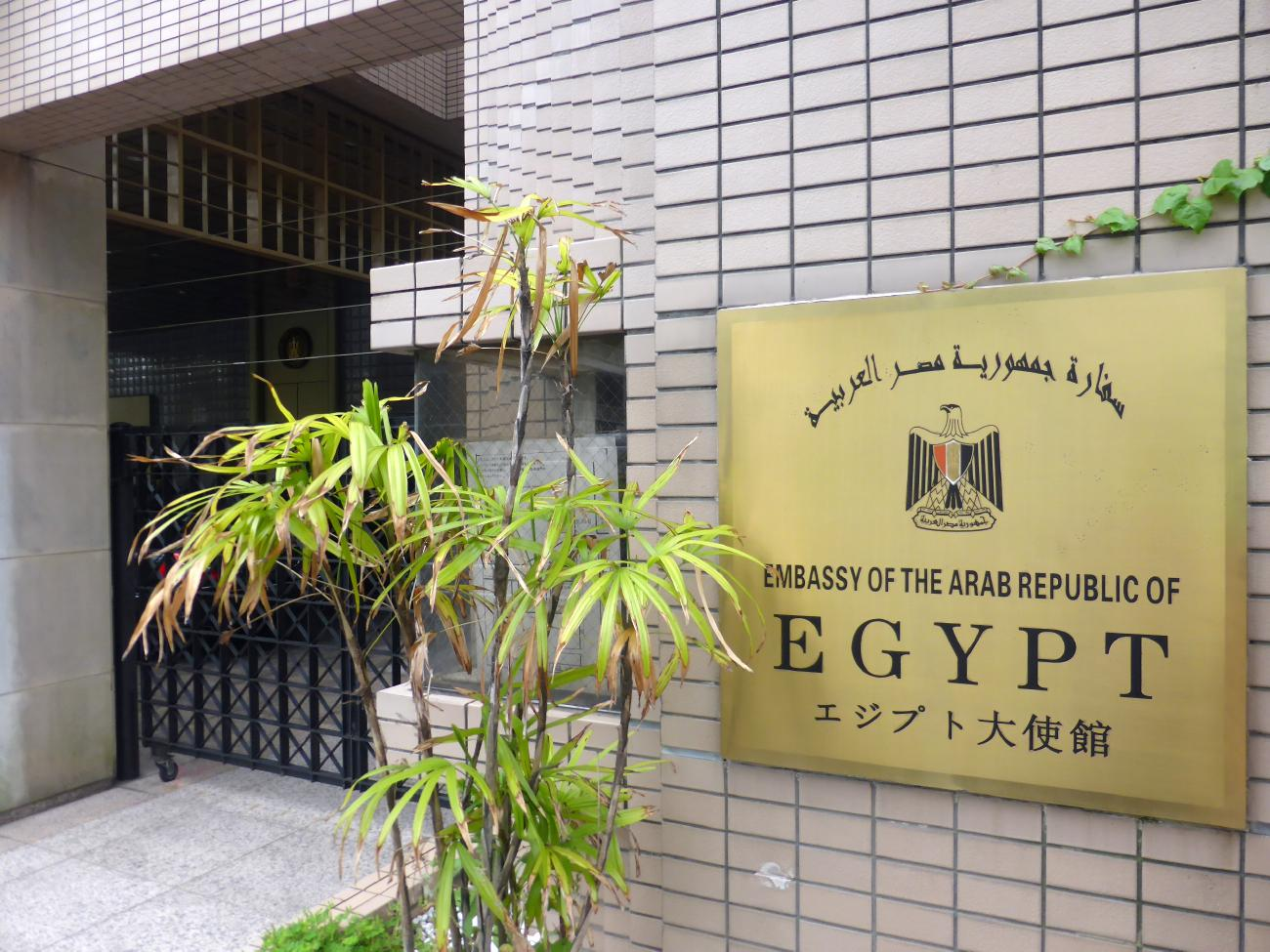
Plaque of the Embassy of Egypt in Tokyo, Japan

Egypt's status as the center of Southwest Asian Culture and the world's foremost authority on some religious studies has drawn Japanese scholars. The cinema, music, and religions of Egypt have been abundant sources of mutual understanding. As a result, both Egyptian professionals in Japan and their Egyptian counterparts in Egypt in a variety of diplomatic, humanitarian, and cultural domains deeply appreciate the importance of the two countries' relationship.

In order to gain the respect of foreign governments and to foster understanding between international nations, cultural exchange is essential. Although Japan has long been interested in Egyptological initiatives, formal scientific research on ancient Egypt did not start in Japan until the 20th century. Professor Isamu Sugi of Tokyo University of Education (now the University of Tsukuba) started an Assyriology and Egyptology programs after 1945, and a number of his students went on to become important figures in Japanese studies of the Ancient Near East. He authored several well read publications in the fields of Egyptology and Assyriology and made a substantial contribution to the growth of the field in Japan.

An exhibition of Tutankhamun's treasures in Tokyo, Kyoto, and Fukuoka in 1965 sparked widespread interest in Egyptology in Japan, and a number of Egyptian exhibitions followed. The exhibition attracted 2,930,000 visitors, the highest attendance in the history of Japanese museums. Nowadays, there are several Egypt museums in Japan such as the Ancient Egypt Museum of Shibuya in Kyoto.

Similarly, Japan places a strong emphasis on its culture as a source of soft power, which is seen in a number of government-led programs including the Cool Japan strategy. In particular following World War II, Egypt has been one of Japan's main centers for Southwest Asian cultural exchange. Egypt was seen by the Japanese government as a vital gateway to Southwest Asia, therefore it established a wide range of cultural organizations there.

To promote cultural interchange, the Japanese Embassy in Cairo founded the Cultural Centre in 1965, which was later renamed the Information and Culture Centre in 1988. The Cairo Research Station was established in 1986 by the Japan Society for the Promotion of Science. The stations have been created in 11 cities throughout the world as centers for academic study. The Cairo station is the only one in the Middle East.

The Japan Foundation opened a branch in Cairo in 1995 with the goal of introducing and publicizing Japanese culture through demonstrations of tea ceremony (sado), screenings of Japanese films and movies, and "Kado" or flower arrangement. Lots of Egyptians have taken Japanese language classes at the center, and several of the graduates have gone on to work as tour guides or for Japanese-language firms in Japan using their language proficiency.

Cairo University's Department of Japanese Language which was established in 1974, located in the Faculty of Arts, is the pioneer in Japanese language instruction and study in Egypt. The construction of Japanese language departments reflects Egyptians' rising interest in Japan and serves as the foundation for mutual cultural understanding.

In July 2025, Egypt announced a Japan-inspired engineering diploma for school students would begin teaching in September 2025. The course is in partnership with the Japan International Cooperation Agency.

== Resident diplomatic missions ==
- Egypt has an embassy in Tokyo.
- Japan has an embassy in Cairo.

== See also ==
- Foreign relations of Egypt
- Foreign relations of Japan
- Japanese people in Egypt
