= Japanese people in Egypt =

Total population
- 1,051 (2009)

Regions with significant populations
- Cairo

Languages
- Arabic · Japanese · English

Religion
- Buddhism · Shinto

Related ethnic groups
- Japanese diaspora

There is a small community of Japanese people in Egypt, mainly of expatriates from Japan. According to Japan's Ministry of Foreign affairs, there were about 1,051 Japanese residents in Egypt as of 2009.

== Overview ==
Japanese Rail engineers and experts dispatched by the Japan International Cooperation Agency have been coming to Cairo to provide technical guidance on inspection and repair work at Cairo Metro.

Japanese firms Kinki Sharyo Co. and the Toshiba Corporation were contracted to produce the majority of the rolling stock for the project. There is also a team of Japanese archaeologists working in Egypt for over 40 years. One of their major projects was radar scanning inside and outside the Great Pyramid. The team has also conducted work at Dashur and Abusir.

Following the 2011 Egyptian Revolution, many Japanese nationals in Egypt left the country. About 470 Japanese nationals fled the growing unrest in Cairo on three Japanese government-charted airplanes arranged by the Japanese Foreign Ministry's emergency task force in February 2011. The Japanese government was also working to check on the welfare of Japanese nationals living in Egypt in the wake of Egyptian President Hosni Mubarak’s resignation.

== Education ==
Japanese schools in Egypt:

- Cairo Japanese School

The Egypt-Japan University of Science and Technology is located in Alexandria.

== See also ==
- Egypt–Japan relations
- Egypt-Japan University of Science and Technology
- Japanese diaspora
- Immigration to Egypt
