= Domiyat =

Egyptian Muslim Admiral and explorer

- Born: Egypt
- Died: Egypt
- Occupations: Admiral, Sea Captain, Explorer
- Writing career
- Language: Coptic, Arabic
- Period: 11th century
- Genre: Travel literature
- Notable work: Account of his voyage to China

Domiyat was an Egyptian admiral, sea captain, and explorer of Egypt's Fatimid Caliphate.

In 1008, Domiyat traveled to the Buddhist pilgrimage site in Shandong, China, to seek out the Chinese Emperor Zhenzong with gifts from his ruler Al-Hakim bi-Amr Allah. His arrival successfully reopened diplomatic relations between Egypt and China that had been lost since the collapse of the Tang dynasty. Egypt became one of only a few countries in the Middle East to establish relations with China in the pre-modern period.
