= Malays in Egypt =

Regions with significant populations
- Cairo · Alexandria

Languages
- English · Indonesian • Malay · Egyptian Arabic

Religion
- Sunni Islam

Related ethnic groups
- Javanese, Malays, Minangkabau

Malays in Egypt make up a part of the overseas Malay population. Malay speakers who came to Egypt are mainly from Indonesia and Malaysia. In 1927, they started a newspaper, Seruan Azhar.
