= Muhammad Saleh Benten =

Saudi politician

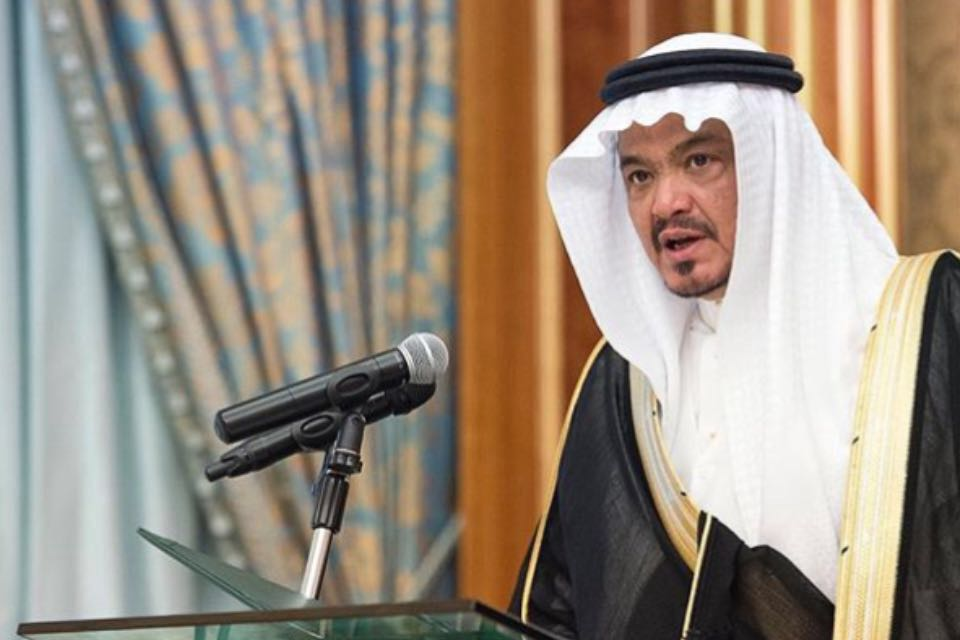
Muhammad Saleh Benten

Muhammad Saleh bin Taher Benten is a Saudi politician who was appointed as the Minister of Hajj and Umrah by King Salman on 27 July 2016. He is of Indonesian descent, from his family name "Benten" which originates from the region of Banten, in western Java, his paternal grandmother was from Banten.

== Education ==
Benten received a doctorate in Computer Engineering from the University of Colorado Boulder, and a masters and bachelors in Electrical Engineering at King Fahd University.

== Career ==
Before becoming Minister, Benten occupied numerous positions. He has been President of the Saudi Post Corporation, assistant deputy minister of Hajj, Deputy Minister of Hajj, and the Dean of Faculty of Computer and Engineering. Benten has published more than 100 scientific studies.

Benten became President of the Saudi Post in 2004 where he oversaw restructuring of the organization. As Deputy Minister of Hajj and Umrah, Benten introduced the e-Umrah project, which facilitated Umrahmt for more than 5 million people.

=== Ministry ===
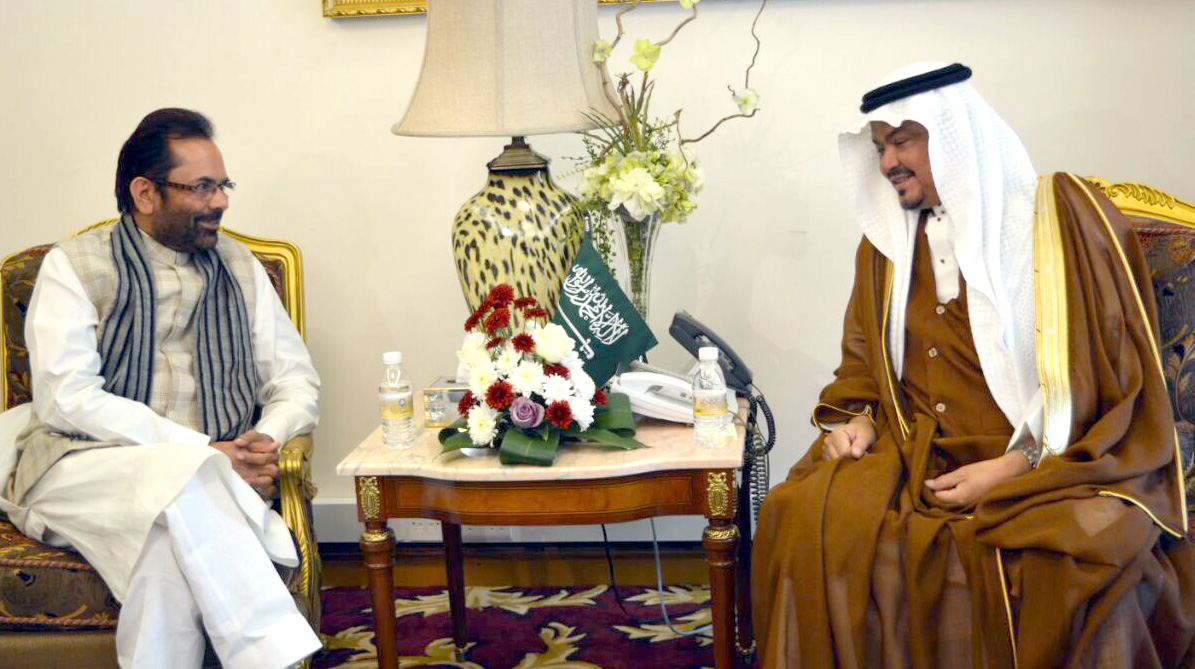
Mukhtar Abbas Naqvi with Mohammad Saleh bin Taher Benten at Jeddah

In 2018, Benten's ministry announced that Umrah performers who were foreigners were permitted to visit any city in Saudi Arabia, but they must spend 15 days of the 30-day Umrah stay visiting the two grand mosques in Mecca and Medina. In December 2018, Benten signed a bilateral agreement with the Indian Minister of Minority Affairs, Mukhtar Abbas Naqvi concerning the Hajj 2019.

=== Recognition ===
Benten won the best Middle East Technical Manager 2002 award and the Best Director in the Middle East award.
