= Jinn =

Supernatural beings in Arab culture and Islam

Jinn جِنّ
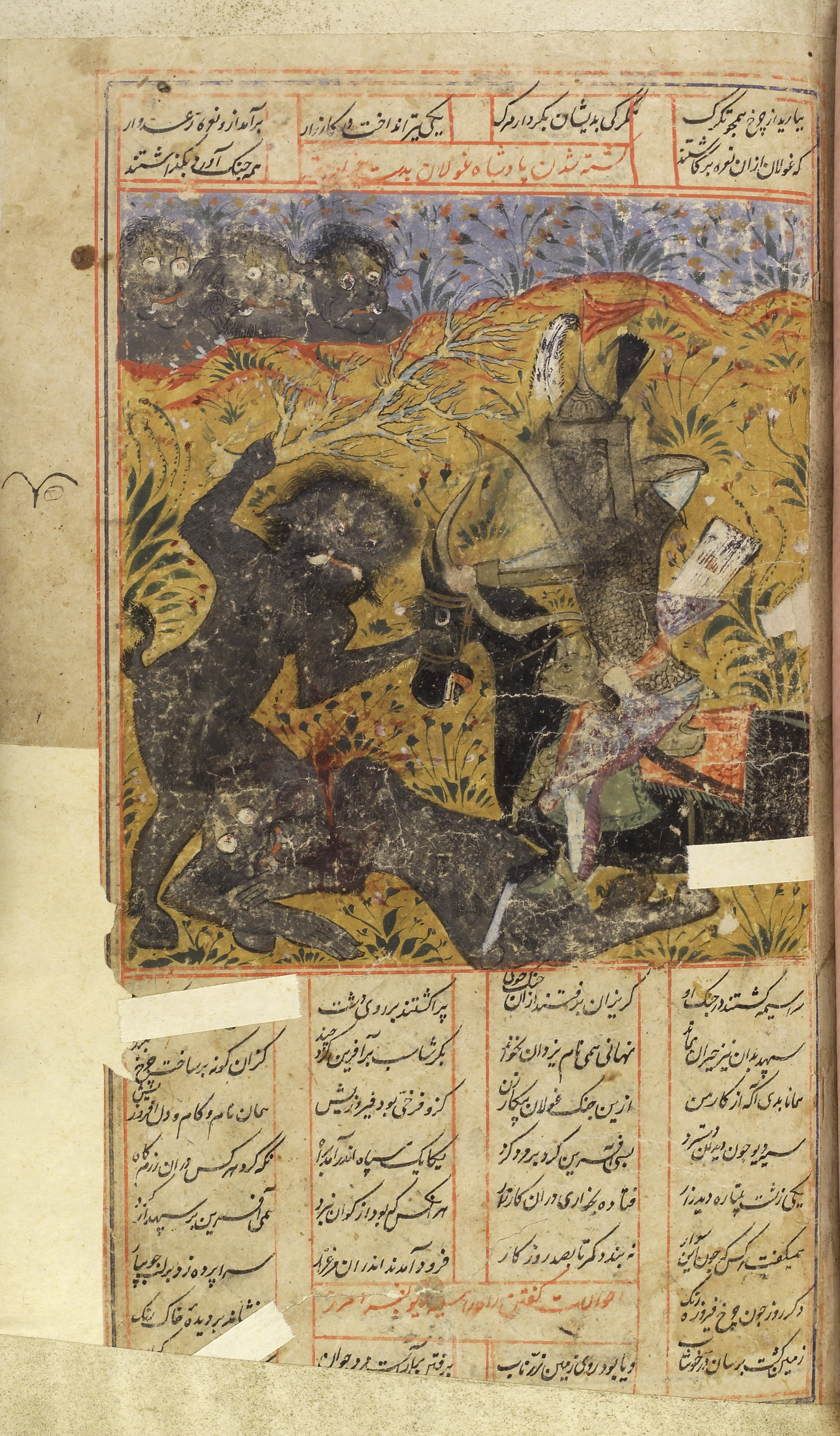
- Jinn gather to do battle with the hero Faramarz. Illustration in an illuminated manuscript of the Iranian epic Shahnameh.

Creature information
- Other name(s): Djinn, jen, genies, Cin, Xhindi
- Grouping: Supernatural being
- Folklore: Arab and Islamic

Origin
- Region: Muslim world

Jinn (Arabic: جِنّ), also romanized as djinn or anglicized as genies, are supernatural beings in Islam, ancient Arabian religion and Arabic folklore and mythology. Like humans, they are accountable for their deeds and can be either believers (Mu'minun) or unbelievers (kuffar), depending on whether they accept God's guidance.

Since jinn are neither innately evil nor innately good, Islam acknowledged spirits from other religions and could adapt them during its expansion. Likewise, jinn are not a strictly Islamic concept; they may represent several pagan beliefs integrated into Islam. (Note: From T. Nünlist (2015) Dämonenglaube im Islam Translation: (in English) "M. Dols points out that jinn-belief is not a strictly Islamic concept. It rather includes countless elements of idol-worship, as Muhammad's enemies practised in Mecca during jahilliya. According to F. Meier early Islam integrated many pagan deities into its system by degrading them to spirits. 1. In Islam, the existence of spirits that are neither angels nor necessarily devils is acknowledged. 2. Thereby Islam is able to incorporate non-biblical[,] non-Quranic ideas about mythic images, that means: a. degrading deities to spirits and therefore taking into the spiritual world. b. taking daemons, not mentioned in the sacred traditions of Islam, of uncertain origin. c. consideration of spirits to tolerate or advising to regulate them." Original: (in German) "M. Dols macht darauf aufmerksam, dass der Ginn-Glaube kein strikt islamisches Konzept ist. Er beinhaltet vielmehr zahllose Elemente einer Götzenverehrung, wie sie Muhammads Gegner zur Zeit der gahiliyya in Mekka praktizierten. Gemäß F. Meier integrierte der junge Islam bei seiner raschen Expansion viele heidnische Gottheiten in sein System, indem er sie zu Dämonen degradierte. 1. Im Islam wird die Existenz von Geistern, die weder Engel noch unbedingt Teufel sein müssen, anerkannt. 2. Damit besitzt der Islam die Möglichkeit, nicht-biblische[,] nicht koranische Vorstellungen von mythischen Vorstellungen sich einzuverleiben, d.h.: a. Götter zu Geistern zu erniedrigen und so ins islamische Geisterreich aufzunehmen. b. in der heiligen Überlieferung des Islams nicht eigens genannte Dämonen beliebiger Herkunft zu übernehmen. c. eine Berücksichtigung der Geister zu dulden oder gar zu empfehlen und sie zu regeln.") Islam places jinn and humans on the same plane in relation to God, with both being subject to divine judgement and an afterlife. The Quran condemns the pre-Islamic Arabian practice of worshipping or seeking protection from them.

While they are naturally invisible, jinn are supposed to be composed of thin and subtle bodies (أَجْسَام, ajsām) and are capable of shapeshifting, usually choosing to appear as snakes, but also as scorpions, lizards, or humans. A jinni's interaction with a human may be negative, positive, or neutral, and can range from casual to highly intimate, even involving sexual activity and the production of hybrid offspring. However, they rarely meddle in human affairs, preferring instead to live among their own in a societal arrangement similar to that of the Arabian tribes. Upon being disturbed or harmed by humans, they usually retaliate in kind, with the most drastic interactions leading them to possess the assailant's body, thus requiring exorcism.

Individual jinn appear on charms and talismans. They are called upon for protection or magical aid, often under the leadership of a king. Many people who believe in jinn wear amulets to protect themselves against their assaults, as they may be called upon by sorcerers and witches to cause harm. A commonly held belief is that jinn cannot hurt someone who wears something with a name of God written on it. These folkloric beliefs and practices, although especially common throughout the Muslim world in the past, have been met with increasing disapproval due to their association with idolatry.

== Etymology and translation ==
Jinn is an Arabic collective noun deriving from the Semitic root jnn (Arabic: جَنّ / جُنّ, jann), whose primary meaning is 'to hide' or 'to adapt'. Some authors interpret the word to mean, literally, 'beings that are concealed from the senses'. Cognates include the Arabic majnūn (مَجْنُون, 'possessed' or, generally, 'insane'), jannah (جَنَّة, 'garden', 'eden' or 'heaven'), and janīn (جَنِين, 'embryo'). Jinn is properly treated as a plural (however in Classical Arabic, may also appear as jānn, جَانّ), with the singular being jinnī (جِنِّيّ), (Note: sometimes Arabs use Jānn (Arabic: جان) term for singular, jānn also referred to jinn world – another plural, snakes / serpents and another type of jinn) from which the English word "genie" is derived.

The origin of the word jinn remains uncertain. Some scholars relate the Arabic term jinn to the Latin genius – a guardian spirit of people and places in Roman religion – as a result of syncretism during the reign of the Roman empire under Tiberius and Augustus; however, this derivation is also disputed. Supporters argue that both Roman genii as well as Arabian jinn are considered to be lesser deities inhabiting local sanctuaries, trees or springs, and persons or families. Aramaic ginnaya (Classical Syriac: ܓܢܝܐ) with the meaning of 'tutelary deity' or 'guardian' are attributed to similar functions and are another possible origin of the term jinn.

Another suggestion holds that the word is of Persian origin and appeared in the form of the Avestic Jaini, a wicked (female) spirit. Jaini were among various creatures in the possibly even pre-Zoroastrian mythology of peoples of Iran. Wensick advocates a purely Arabic origin of the term, asserting that according to the common Semitic view psychic and bodily affections are caused by spirits. An object reacting upon such an effect would be an incarnation of said spirit. Since these spirits are covered from the sight of humans, they would have been called jinn.

The anglicized form genie is a borrowing of the French génie, also from the Latin genius. It first appeared in 18th century translations of the Thousand and One Nights from the 1706 French edition, where it had been used owing to its rough similarity in sound and sense and its application to benevolent intermediary spirits, in contrast to the malevolent spirits called 'demon' and mostly-benevolent 'heavenly angels', in literature. In Assyrian art, the modern term used for creatures ontologically between humans and divinities is also genie.

Though not a precise fit, descriptive analogies that have been used for these beings in Western thought include demon, spirit, sprite, and fairy, depending on the source. In turn, the Arabic translation for the Greek nymph (arūsa) is also used for jinn by Middle Eastern sources. Although the term spirit is frequently used, it has been criticised for not capturing the corporeal nature of the jinn, and that the term genie should be used instead.

== Pre-Islamic era ==
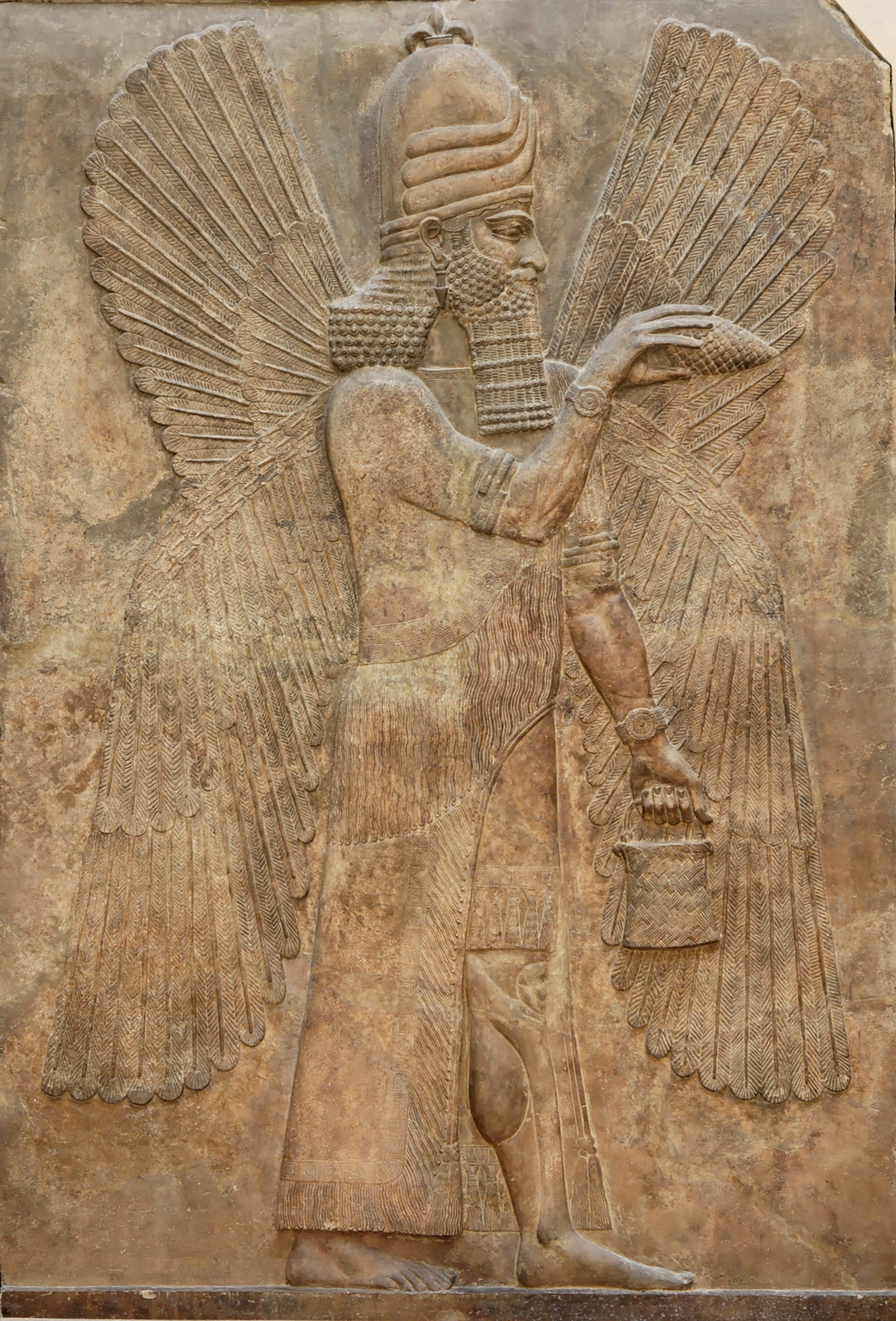
The winged genie in the bucket and cone motif, depicting a demi-divine entity, probably a forerunner of the pre-Islamic tutelary deities, who became the jinn in Islam. Relief from the north wall of the Palace of king Sargon II at Dur Sharrukin, 713–716 BCE.

The exact origins of belief in jinn are not entirely clear. Belief in jinn in pre-Islamic Arab religion is attested not only by the Quran, but also by pre-Islamic Arabic poetry. Some scholars of the Middle East hold that they originated as malevolent spirits residing in deserts and unclean places, who often took the forms of animals; others hold that they were originally pagan nature deities who gradually became marginalized as other deities took greater importance. Many ancient deities may have developed from jinn, while others represent degraded gods.

Joseph Chelhod connects the jinn to ancient Middle Eastern dualistic beliefs, according to which heaven and earth represent the polar opposites of order and chaos respectively. The high god El (or Allah) represents the source of the holy celestial abode, while the jinn are the chthonic powers of the lower world. The jinn continuously rise to the sky in an attempt to obtain divinity. The belief that angels are daughters born from a union between Allah and jinn would derive from the assumption of a union between the heavenly and earthly forces, which are then represented in the intermediate world in the form of stars.

=== Fear and veneration ===
Jinn were already worshipped by many Arabs in pre-Islamic Arabia. Julius Wellhausen observed that jinn were often thought to "inhabit or haunt desolate, dark and dingy places in the desert". For that reason, they were held responsible for various diseases and mental illnesses. Emilie Savage-Smith asserts that malicious jinn and good gods were distinct in pre-Islamic Arabia, but admits that such distinction is not absolute. In the regions north of the Hejaz, Palmyra and Baalbek, the terms jinni and ilah (deity) were often used interchangeably. Julius Wellhausen likewise agrees that in pre-Islamic Arabia it was assumed there are at least some friendly and helpful beings among the jinn. He distinguishes between a god and a jinni, not on the basis of morality, but on the basis of worship; the jinn are worshipped in private while the gods are worshipped in public.

Muqatil ibn Sulayman attributes the origin of the practice of jinn-veneration to the Banu Hanifa. When travelling through the wilderness and the sun sets, they sought refuge among the spirits of the place:

فأول من تعوذ بالجن قوم من أهل اليمن من بني حنفية، ثم فشا ذلك في سائر العرب، وذلك أن الرجل كان يسافر في الجاهلية فإذا أدركه المساء في الأرض القفر قال أعوذ بسيد هذا الوادي من سفهاء قومه فيبيت آمنا في جوارهم حتى يصبح.

The first who sought refuge among the jinn were people from Yemen, from the Banu Hanifa tribe. Afterwards, this [practice] spread to the rest of the Arabs. When a man during the era of Jahiliyyah traveled the lands and realized the evening sets over the desert, he would say, "I seek refuge in the master of this valley from the impudent ones," so he would spend the night safely in their vicinity until morning.

Al-Jahiz credits the pre-Islamic Arabs with believing that the society of jinn constitutes several tribes and groups, analogous to pre-Islamic Arabian culture. Jinn could also protect, marry, kidnap, possess, and kill people. Despite being invisible, jinn are considered to have bodies (ajsām); as described by Zakariya al-Qazwini, they are among animals, along with humans, burdened beasts (like horses), cattle, wild beasts, birds, and reptiles. Jinn are further known as shapeshifters, often assuming the form of an animal, favouring the form of a snake. Other chthonic animals regarded as forms of jinn include scorpions and lizards. Both scorpions and serpents have been venerated in the ancient Near East.

When they shift into a human form however, they are said to stay partly animal and are not fully human. Although the powers of jinn usually exceed those of humans, it is conceivable a man could kill a jinni in single combat, but they are feared for attacking without being seen. Some sources even speak of killed jinn leaving behind a carcass similar to either a serpent or a scorpion.

=== Poetry and soothsaying ===
Even though they were often feared or inspired awe, the jinn were also pictured to befriend humans or have romantic feelings for them. According to common Arabian belief, pre-Islamic soothsayers, philosophers, and poets were inspired by the jinn. In his Book of Idols, Al-Kalbi records a story about a jinni named Abū-Thumama working as an oracle advising Amr ibn Luhay.

The Arabian poet al-A'sha (d. after 3/625) claimed that his inspiration for his poetry came from a befriended jinni named Misḥal ("daʿawtu khalīlī Misḥalan") whom he called his jinni-brother ("akhī ʾl-jinnī"). Similarly, the poet Thābit (d. 54/674) who later converted to Islam and became known as "the poet of the prophet", referred to his jinni-friend as his "sharp-sighted brother from the jinn" ("wa-akhī min al-jinn al-baṣīr"). The relationship between jinn and humans can also be romantic in nature. According to one famous Arabian story, the jinni Manzur fell in love with a human woman called Habbah, and taught her the arts of healing.

The mutual relationship between jinn and humans is different from that of a jinni and a soothsayer (kāhin). The soothsayer is presented as someone who is totally controlled by the jinni entering them. The soothsayer was consulted to reveal hidden information or settle disputes, as it was believed that the jinn speaking through them revealed hidden knowledge. Muhammad's opponents believed that the Quran was also inspired by a jinni, whereupon the Quran criticizes them for not distinguishing between jinn and God.

== Islam ==
Jinn have been called an integral part of the Muslim tradition or faith, completely accepted in official Islam, and prominently featured in folklore. Medieval and modern scholars have studied the consequences implied by their existence, legal status, and the possible relations between them and mankind, especially in questions of marriage and property.

Medieval sources describe the jinn inhabiting the earth before the creation of mankind. They serve as a pattern for later human disobedience: they were first created by God, then rebelled against God's messengers, shed blood and exploited the environment, and were eventually punished by God's angels. Muslims raised the question of whether some jinn may have survived from primordial times. Some Quran exegetes such as ibn Kathir hold this to be the case. Especially in folklore, the belief that some jinn still hide in desolate places and wastelands is widespread.

=== Quran ===
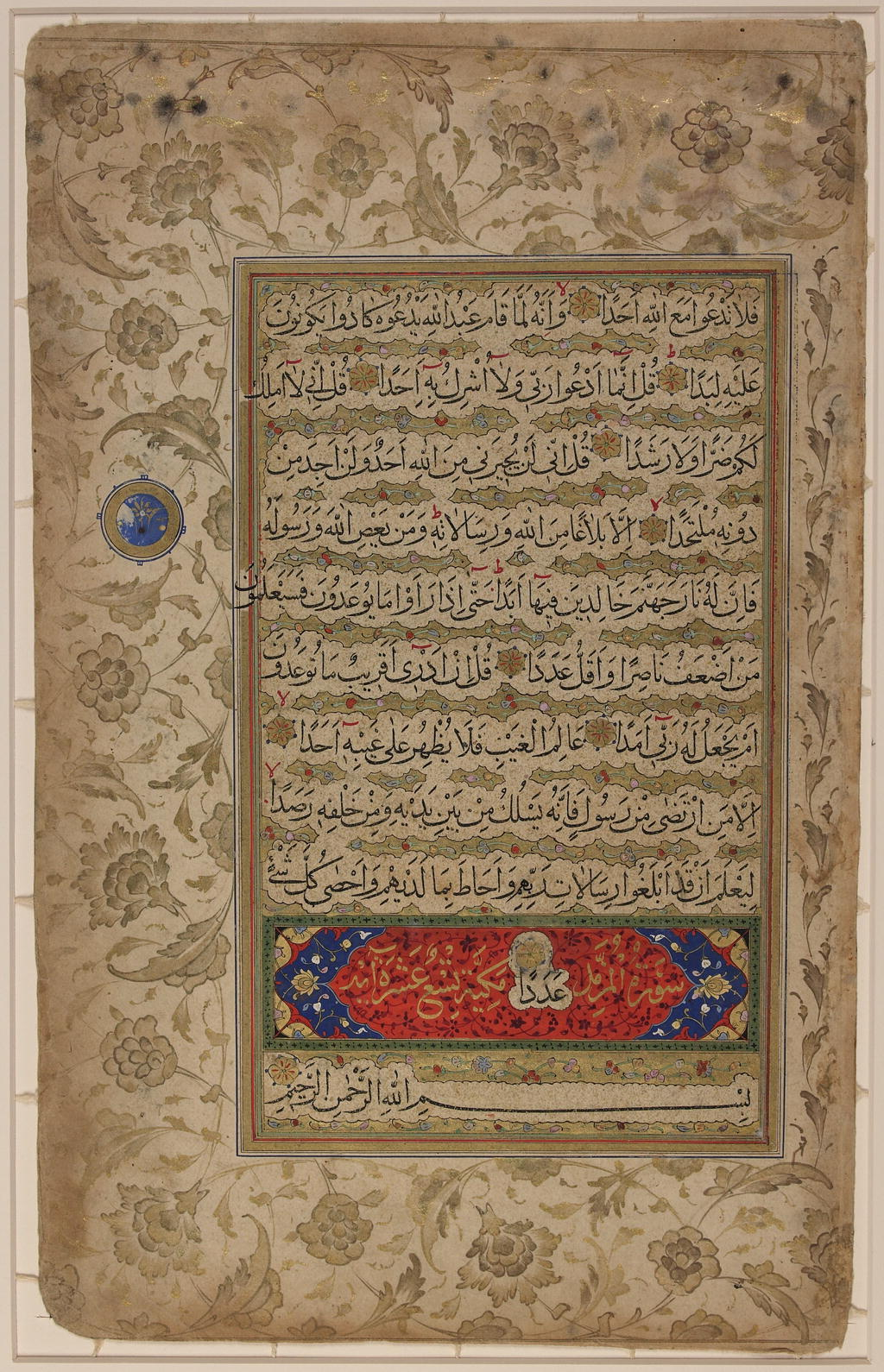
The 72nd chapter of the Qur'an entitled Al-Jinn (The Jinn), as well as the heading and introductory bismillah of the next chapter entitled al-Muzzammil (The Enshrouded One)

Jinn are mentioned approximately 29 times in the Quran, exclusively in Meccan surahs. The Quran assumes that the audience is familiar with the subject without elaborating on the jinn much further. According to the Quran 51:56-57, Muhammad was sent as a prophet to both human and jinn communities, and prophets and messengers were sent to both communities.

Throughout the Quran, humans and jinn (al-ins wa-l-jinn) appear frequently as a pair, designating their equal status in regards to their creation and rejecting that jinn share divinity with the Creator. The term ins derives from anisa, which means "to be familiar with", and refers to recognisable, familiar human beings. In contrast, the term jinn refers to foreign, invisible, or unknown anthropomorphic beings, which are nonetheless subject to the same considerations as the former. They were both created to worship God (51:56). Because they are supposed to worship God out of free will, they can do both good and evil deeds (7:179, 55:56). They are, like humans, rational beings formed of nations (7:38).

Surah al-jinn is about the revelation to jinn. This Surah mentions righteous jinn on one hand, and malicious jinn on the other. The jinn can neither harm nor benefit humans, for they are occupied with looking after themselves and their own place in the cosmos. This is in notable contrast to demons and devils in the Judeo-Christian tradition. The Quran does not condemn the jinn as a source of harm, but condemns mistaking them for beings deserving cultic veneration (72:6). Jinn and humans are blamed for ascribing divine attributes to another creature (i.e. jinn)—jinn to themselves and humans to the jinn. The prophet Muhammad is believed to preach to both humans and jinn about islām. Some were Jewish jinn (46:29-32) while others were pagans (72:2-7) who aided fortune tellers and soothsayers.

In the Quranic account, despite their similarities with humans, there are important differences between these two species. Whereas humans are made from "clay" or "dirt", jinn were created from "smokeless fire" (Quran 15:27, Quran 55:15), which is possibly the reason why they are credited with some extraordinary abilities, such as invisibility, transformation, and ascending into the air like devils (Quran 72:8). Despite some superhuman powers, the jinn occupy no fundamentally different position in the Quran than humans. Like humans, the jinn have no knowledge of the future. Like humanity, jinn face epistemic limitations regarding "the hidden/occult", have to rely on God's messengers, and face eschatological judgement.

=== Exegesis ===
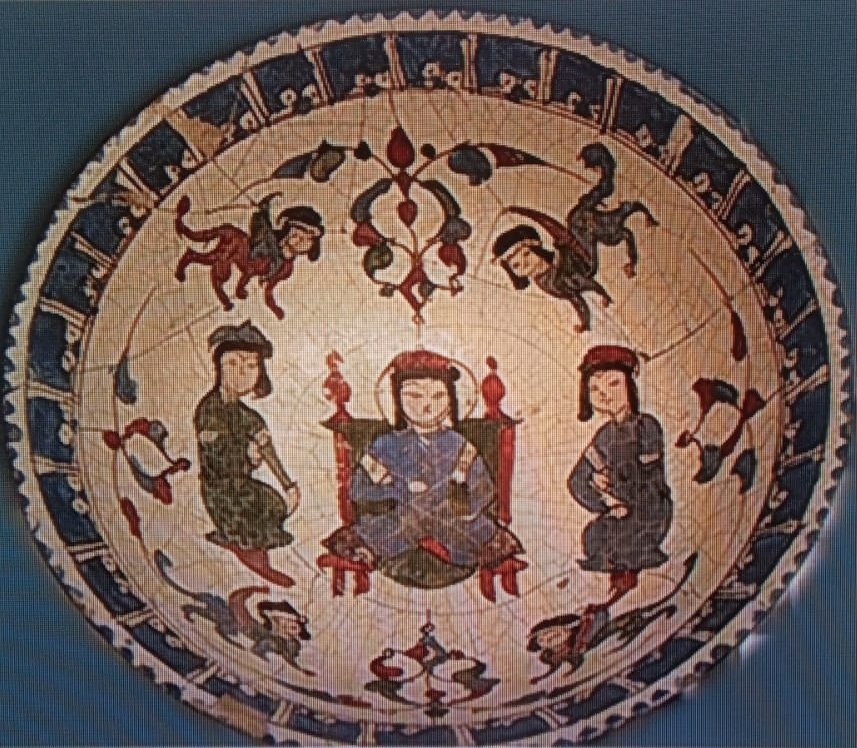
Kashan, Iran, late 12th–13th century mina'i-fritware bowl. The scene in this bowl can be understood as depicting the enthroned (Second) Sulaymān with messengers to either side, crowned human headed winged jinn.

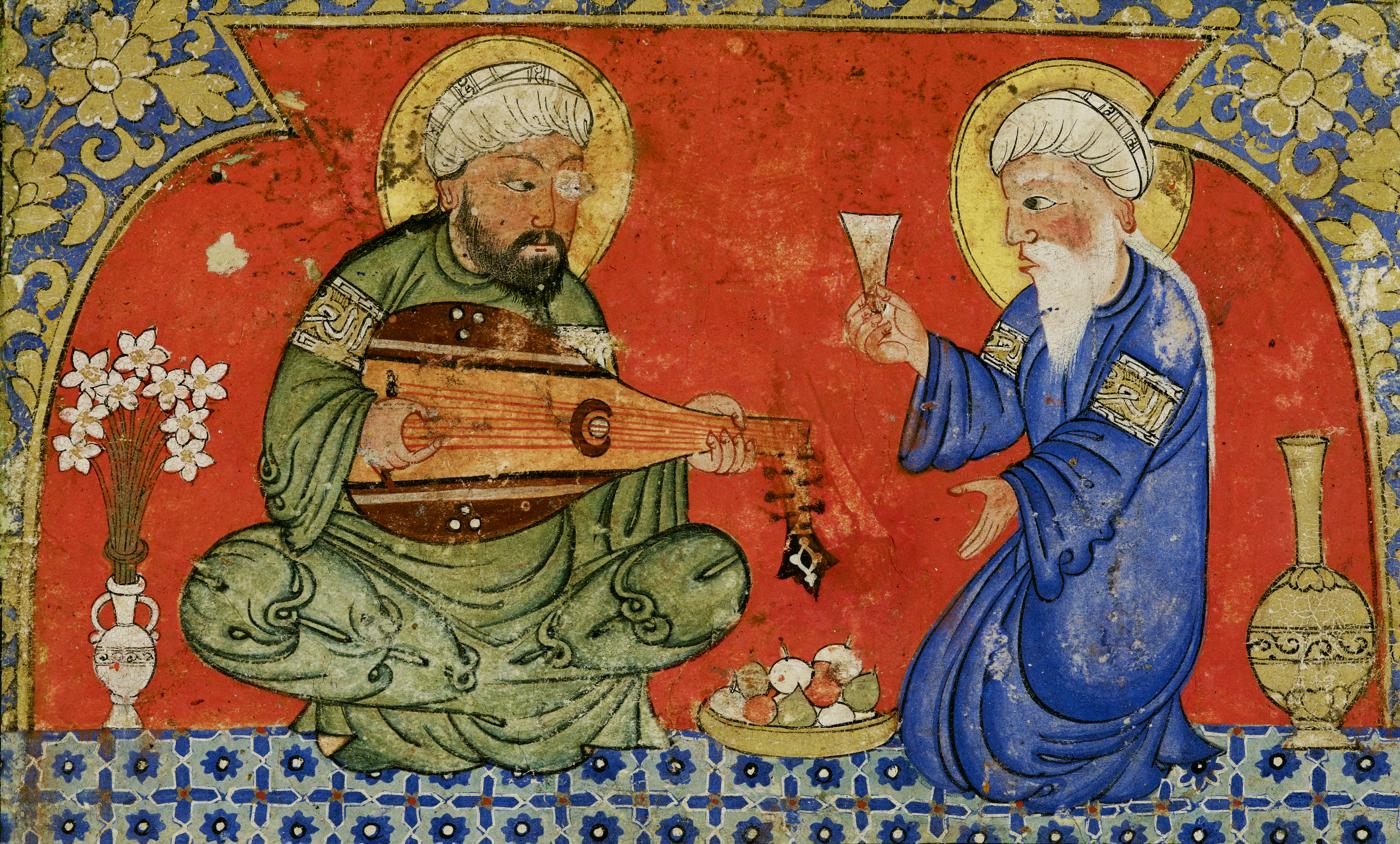
The Singer Ibrahim and the jinn. Ibrahim has been imprisoned by his master Muhammad al-Amin and visited by a jinn in guise of an old man. The jinn offers him food and drink and is so impressed by Ibrahim's voice that he convinces al-Amin to free him.

The term jinn is polysemic and can refer to (genuine) jinn, angels, and devils. For example, Surah ’aṣ-ṣāffāt states: "And they imagine kinship between him and the jinn, whereas the jinn know well that they will be brought before (Him)." In Islamic exegesis, the verse uses the term jinn to refer to both angels and devils simultaneously, but for different meanings:

هو أنهم قالوا: الـملائكة بنات الله، وقالوا: الـجِنَّة: هي الـملائكة. ذكر من قال

They said: The angels are the daughters of God, and they said: These jinn are the angels.

In Quranic interpretation and Muslim texts, the term jinn is thus used for any object hidden from sight, such as angels, devils, and the (spiritual) interior of human beings (psyche), (Note: This is, for example, evident from A'sha's saying in mention of Sulayman ibn Dawud; and He subjected from the jinn among the angels (min jinni al-mala'iki)" Al-Jahiz defines jinn as various spirits defined by their behaviour; a malicious and wicked jinn is called a s̲h̲ayṭān, a jinn lifting a heavy weight and listening at the doors of Heaven is a mārid, a jinn of great intelligence is called an ʿabḳarī, a jinn entirely good and pure is an angel.) as well as to a specific being, separate from both angels and devils. An example of jinn referred to in the former sense can be found in al-Ghazali's Alchemy of Bliss, in which the author describes jinn as the internal angelic and demoniacal qualities of the human mind. (Note: "However, that knowledge of the soul which leads to the knowledge of God, is not of this kind. The knowledge which you need to possess is, to know what you are; how you are created; whence you are; for what you are here; whither you are going; in what your happiness consists, and what you must do to secure it; in what your misery consists, and what you must do to avoid it. And further, your internal qualities are distributed into animal, ferocious, demoniacal and angelic qualities. You need to know, therefore, what qualities predominate in your character, and in the predominance of which your true happiness consists. If your qualities are chiefly animal, the essence of which is to eat and drink, you will day and night seek after these things. If your qualities are of the ferocious kind, the essence of which is to tear and rend, to injure and destroy, you will act accordingly. If you are endowed chiefly with the qualities of devils, which consist in evil machinations, deceit and delusion, then you should know and be aware of it, that you may turn towards the path of perfection. And if you possess angelic qualities, whose nature it is to worship God in sincerity and continually to await the vision of His beauty, then like them you should unceasingly, resting neither day or night, be zealous and strive that you may become worthy of the vision of the Lord. For know, O student of the mysteries! that man was created to stand at the door of service in frailty and weakness, and wait for the opening of the door of spiritual union, and for the vision of beauty, as God declares in his holy word: "I have not created the genii and men except that they should worship me." ") The latter, separate type are believed to be the offspring of al-Jānn, created out of "smokeless fire" (Arabic: مَارِجٍ مِن نَّار, mārijin min nār) – whereas the angels are created from light and the devils from "pure fire" or "fire of poison" – and considered to be, along with humans, thaqalān (lit. 'weighty ones', meaning, they are 'accountable for their deeds', or 'honoured on earth by God'). Muqatil ibn Sulayman describes the creation of these jinn as follows:

وذلك أن الله عز وجل خلق الملائكة والجن قبل خلق الشياطين والإنس، وهو آدم، عليه السلام، فجعلهم سكان الأرض، وجعل الملائكة سكان السماوات، فوقع فى الجن الفتن والحسد، فاقتتلوا، فبعث الله جنداً من أهل سماء الدنيا، يقال لهم الجن، إبليس عدو الله منهم، خلقوا جميعاً من نار، وهم خزان الجنة رأسهم إبليس، فهبطوا إلى الأرض

This is because God Almighty created the angels and the jinn before He created the devils and mankind, namely Adam, peace be upon him. He made them [the jinn] inhabitants of the earth, and He made the angels inhabitants of the heavens. Then temptations and envy overcame the jinn and so they began to fight. Whereupon God sent an army from the people of the lowest heaven, called al-jinn [the angelic tribe], with Iblis, the enemy of God, among them. They were all created from fire, and they are the keepers of Paradise, with Iblis as their leader.

Belief in jinn is not included among the six articles of Islamic faith, as belief in angels is. Nonetheless, many Muslim scholars, including the Hanbalī scholar ibn Taymiyya and the Ẓāhirī scholar ibn Hazm, believe they are essential to the Islamic faith since they are mentioned in the Quran. Although jinn do not play any major role in Sufi literature, their existence is never doubted. They feature in poetic anecdotes but, because of their similarities to humans, function neither as a model to follow (like angels) nor tempters of the lower self (like Satan).

Jinn are generally weak and fragile beings, whose potencies derive mostly from people attributing powers to them. (Note: Al-Māturīdī on Surah 72:1-6: ولأن الجن أضعف من الإنس؛ ألا ترى أنها تختفي من الإنس وتتصور بغير صورتها؛ فرقا؛ لئلا يشعر بها الإنس، وبلغ في ضعفها: أنها لا تقدر على إتلاف أحد من البشر، ولا تقدر على سلب أموالهم، ولا إفساد طعامهم وشرابهم، واستنصار القوي بالضعيف أداة الذلة؛ فيخرج تأويل [من قال] بأن الرهق هو الذلة والضعف على هذا.; Because the jinn are weaker than humans, do you not see that they disappear from humans and take on a different form, out of fear, so that humans do not sense them? And their weakness has reached the point where they are unable to harm any human being, nor are they able to steal their money, nor spoil their food and drink. The strong seeking help from the weak is a tool of humiliation, so the interpretation of [those who said] that oppression is humiliation and weakness is based on this.: Abu Hatim Muhammad ibn Idris al-Razi on Surah 72:1-6: حَدَّثَنَا أَبُو سَعِيدٍ يَحْيَى بْنُ سَعِيدٍ الْقَطَّانُ، حَدَّثَنَا وَهْبُ بْنُ جَرِيرٍ، حدثنا أبى، حدثنا الزبير ابن الْخِرِّيتِ عَنْ عِكْرَمَةَ قَالَ: كَانَ الْجِنُّ يَفْرَقُونَ مِنَ الْإِنْسِ كَمَا يَفْرَقُ الْإِنْسُ مِنْهُمْ أَوْ أَشَدُّ، وَكَانَ الْإِنْسُ إِذَا نَزَلُوا وَادِيًا هَرَبَ الْجِنُّ، فَيَقُولُ سَيِّدُ الْقَوْمِ: نَعُوذُ بِسَيِّدِ أَهْلِ هَذَا الْوَادِي. فَقَالَ الْجِنُّ: نَرَاهُمْ يَفْرَقُونَ مِنَّا كَمَا نَفْرَقُ مِنْهُمْ، فَدَنَوْا مِنَ الْإِنْسِ فَأَصَابُوهُمْ بِالْخَبَلِ وَالْجُنُونِ، فَذَلِكَ قَوْلُ اللَّهِ: وَأَنَّهُ كَانَ رِجَالٌ مِنَ الإِنْسِ يَعُوذُونَ بِرِجَالٍ مِنَ الْجِنِّ فَزَادُوهُمْ رَهَقًا.; Abu Saeed Yahya bin Saeed Al-Qattan told us, Wahb bin Jarir told us, my father told us, Al-Zubayr bin Al-Khirrit told us, on the authority of Ikrimah, who said: The jinn used to be afraid of humans as much as humans were afraid of them, or even more so. And when humans went down to a valley, the jinn would flee, and the leader of the people would say: We seek refuge with the leader of the people of this valley. The jinn said: We see them afraid of us as we are afraid of them. So they approached the humans and afflicted them with madness and insanity. That is what God said: "And that there were men from among mankind who sought refuge with men from among the jinn, so they increased them in burden.") Even though jinn are mostly impotent, they are able to possess people. The majority of Muslim scholars hold the opinion that jinn can at least possess individuals. This is considered to be part of the doctrines (aqidah) of the "people of the Sunnah" (ahl as-sunnah wal-jammah'a) in the tradition of Ash'ari. The Atharī scholars ibn Taimiyya and ibn Qayyim agree on this matter.

From among the Sunni schools of theology, only some of the Māturīdīs seem to doubt possession. Al-Rustughfanī deemed jinn-possession impossible. Abu al-Yusr al-Bazdawi (c.1030-c.1100) asserts that jinn, like devils, can whisper to the people. He refers to Surah an-Nas stating "that whispers into the heart of men from the jinn and humans" (Original: الْذى يُوَسُوس فى صدور النّاس من الْجنّة والناس). Due to their subtile bodies, both jinn and devils could also enter through the pores of a human and refers to a hadith: "the devil flows through the veins of the sons of Adam like blood" (Original: الشيطان يجرى من بنى آدم مجرى الدم). Like every other being, jinn and devils cannot cause anything by themselves, but only acquire (kasb) their action through God's will. Unlike devils, some of the jinn enter paradise.

Unlike devils and demons, jinn might be helpful or even benevolent. Jinn helping people is well known throughout Islamic literature. In the story about the burial of Nasir Khusraw, two jinn mourn the death of Nasir Khusraw and help his disciple Abū Sa'īd to prepare a rock as a tomb and wash the body of the dead master. Al-Suyuti narrates an encounter in which a jinni challenges a human to a duel. If he can defeat the jinni, the jinni would reveal Ayatul-Kursi (the verse of the Throne) to him, which grants him protection from demons and devils. (Note: خرج رجل من الإِنس، فلقيه رجل من الجن فقال: هل لك أن تصارعني؟ فإن صرعتني علمتك آية إذا قرأتها حين تدخل بيتك لم يدخله شيطان، فصارعه فصرعه الإِنسي. A man from the humans met a man from the jinn and [the jinn] said: Will you fight against me? If you defeat me, I will teach you a verse that, if you recite it when you enter your house, no devil will enter it. So he fought him and the human man defeated him.) Rather than focusing on possession, Al-Māturīdī focuses on the dynamics between jinn and humans based on their role as semi-divinities in pre-Islamic Arabia alluded to in Quran 72:6, and discusses how to properly handle interactions with jinn and what to avoid:

وقيل بأن هذا الفعل من الإنس - وهو الاستجارة بهم - شرك؛ لأن الله تعالى هو المجير؛ فكان الحق عليهم أن يستجيروا بالله تعالى؛ ليدفع عنهم مكايد الجن، وألا يروا لأنفسهم ناصرا غير الله تعالى، فإذا فزعوا في الاستجارة إلى الجن، فقد رأوا غير الله تعالى يقوم عنهم بالذب والنصر؛ فكان ذلك منهم شركا.

It has been said that this act by humans—seeking refuge with them—is shirk, because God Almighty is the only true protector. Therefore, they should have sought refuge with God Almighty to ward off the plots of the jinn, and they should not have seen any protector other than God Almighty. So, when they resort to seeking refuge with the jinn, they have seen someone other than God Almighty defend and support them, and this is shirk on their part.

He states that seeking refuge among the jinn increases fear and anxiety, not because of the power of the jinn, but due to the psychological dependence of the individual towards external powers. By that, he refers to seeking refuge among the jinn as a form of širk, due to the reliance on a created thing instead of God. If the jinn are not mistaken for gods, the jinn are harmless or may even have a protective function.

=== Jurisprudence ===
The jinn are obligated to follow the divine law (sharīʿa), as derived from the Quran by Muslim jurists (faqīh). Thus, the jinn are considered, along with humans, to be mukallāf. Believers among the jinn are called "Muslim jinn" (muslimū l-jinn).

Since both creations must perform the required prayers (salah), Muslim jurists debated if one is allowed to perform the prayer behind a jinni. Badr al-Din al-Shibli cites two Hanbalite scholars who regard this as permissible without hesitation. Since Muhammad was sent to jinn and humans, both are mukallāf and subject to the command to pray. (Note: From T. Nünlist (2015) Dämonenglaube im Islam Translation: (in English) "Islamic jurists have also repeatedly addressed the question of whether the jinn have a religion. Shibli notes that in this context they had a controversial discussion about whether it was permissible under Sharia law to perform the Muslim ritual prayer (salat) behind a genie. Two Hanbali sources led by Shibli affirm this permissibility without hesitation and justify their point of view by saying that not only the humans (ins) but also the jinn are "mukallaf". Original: (in German) "Auch die islamischen Rechtsgelehrten haben sich wiederholt mit der Frage beschäftigt, ob die Dschinn eine Religion haben. Shchibli hält fest, dass sie in diesem Zusammenhang kontrovers diskutiert hätten, ob es schariarehtlich zulässig sei, das muslimische Ritualgebet (salat) hinter einem Dschinni zu verrichten. Zwei von Schibli angeführte hanbalitische Gewährsleute bejahen diese Zulässigkeit ohne Zögern und begründen ihren Standpunkt damit, dass nicht nur die Menschen (ins), sondern auch die Dschinn mukallaf seien.")

Because humans and jinn are capable of procreation, Muslim jurists had to address the permissibility of intercourse between these two types of creatures. Some Ḥadīths, though considered fabricated (mawḍūʻ) by some muhaddith (hadith scholars), pushed the necessity for an explanation:

"The Hour will come when the children of jinn will become many among you."

— Suyuti, Laqt al-marjân, 38.

"Among you are those who are expatriated (mugharrabûn);" and this, he explained, meant "crossed with jinn."

— Suyuti, Laqt al-marjân, 28.

Although there are recorded cases of purported human-jinn relationships, (Note: In a study of exorcism culture in the Hadhramaut of Yemen, love was one of the most frequent cited causes of relationships between humans and jinn. Love seems to be the most frequent occasion of contact between men and jinn. A jinni meets a woman and falls in love with her, or vice versa... This possession is manifest notably when the jinni has sexual intercourse with the person he/she possesses. In that case, the individual behaves with gestures and words as if they were having sexual intercourse, although he/she is apparently alone in the room. Besides, this person seems to suddenly lose all interest for his/her environment.") most Muslim jurists agree that such a relationship is not permissible. Even those scholars who allowed such relationships still considered them undesirable (makruh). Offspring of human-jinn relationships are nonetheless usually considered to be gifted and talented people with special abilities. Some scholars also showed approval by referring to the union between the prophet Solomon in Islam and the Queen Bilqis, who is said to be a jinn-hybrid. Yet, as according to Islamic hagiography, she had to remove the hair on her legs, which was believed to be a sign of her jinn-ancestry, as traits inherited from the jinn were met with suspicion.

=== Folklore ===
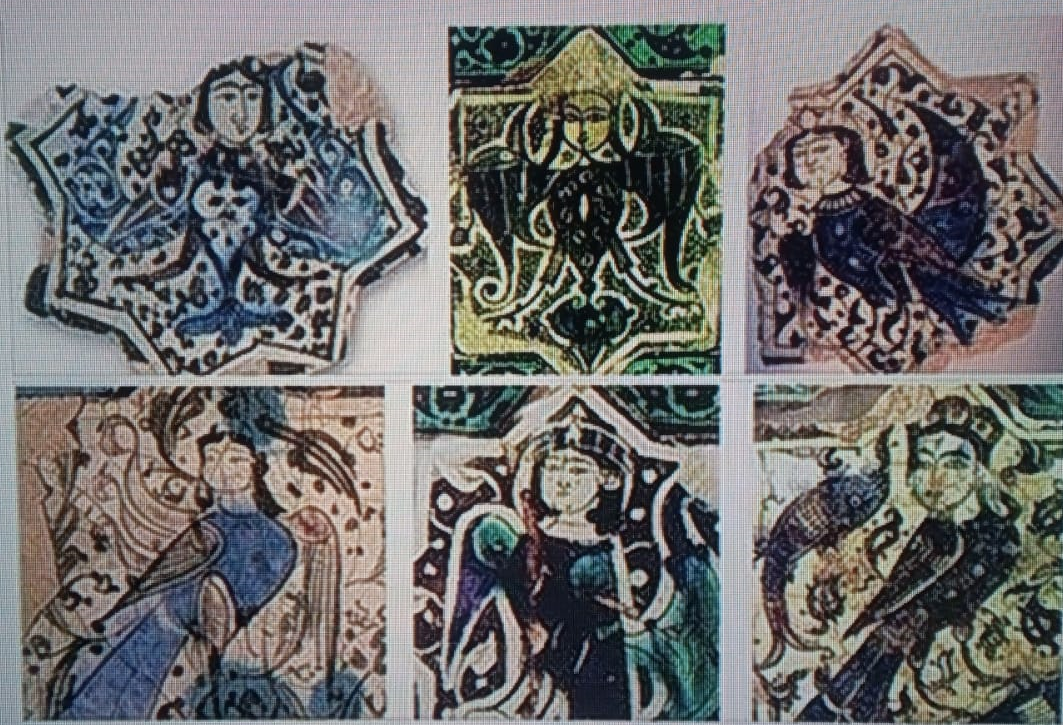
Examples of the Jinn of the Air depicted on Seljuk 13th-century tilework from Kubad Abad

The jinn (also known as: Albanian: Xhindi, Bosnian: Džin, Turkish: Cin) were adopted by later Islamic culture, since the Quran affirms their existence. This allowed animistic beliefs to remain among new Muslims after converting to the monotheistic religion. Although depictions are categorized into little tradition (folklore) and greater tradition (official Islam) for research purposes, both depictions are largely the same. (Note: From T. Nünlist (2015) Dämonenglaube im Islam Translation: (in English) "The distinction made between popular and scriptural Islam or between little and great traditions proves to be problematic and only serves as a makeshift here. This comparison implicitly suggests that the representations of daemonology in written sources differ from the findings documented in ethnographic, anthropological and sociologically oriented field studies. Such a view must be rejected. The treatment of the belief in daemons in the written sources primarily consulted in the context of these studies does not differ fundamentally from the views observed in popular Islam. Popular Islam and scriptural Islam do not design separate daemonologies. This situation is explained not least by the fact that the Quran and Sunna, the two most important sources in the area of Islam for the great tradition, clearly affirm the existence of.")

The Quran does not consider foreign mythological beings to be devils, but entities erroneously ascribed divine power to. Therefore, jinn were considered a third class of invisible beings, often neutral or morally ambiguous, not consequently equated with devils. Islam integrated local beliefs about spirits and deities from Iran, Africa, Turkey and India into a monotheistic framework without demonizing them. Besides local deities, the existence of purely malevolent spirits is also acknowledged. Thus, jinn exist alongside other mythological entities, such as demons (Dēw) and fairies (parī).

The moral attitude of the jinn is usually associated with their religion. Good jinn are usually considered Muslim jinn or jinn Islam, whereas unbelieving jinn were tempted by the devils (shayatin) and are called kāfir jinn or jinn kāfir. Besides Islam, they could also practise Christianity and Judaism. Good jinn might teach people moral lessons and might be benevolent, or aid spiritual persons, such as shamans (kam) in Central Asia, or spiritual healers in Senegal. Mediha Esenel's studies in 1940 Anatolia mention the belief that spiritually gifted people can act as intermediaries between humans and jinn.

Most of the time, jinn are believed not to interfere with humans and live mostly in desolate or abandoned places. This is, for example, evident from the Turkish phrase İn Cin top oynuyor. It is only when they are angered or disturbed—for example, if their children are trodden upon or hot water is thrown on them—that they take revenge on humans. For this reason, Muslims utter "destur" (permission) before doing something which might accidentally hurt jinn, such as sprinkling hot water on public grounds or into bushes, so present jinn are advised to leave the place.

Angered or straightforwardly evil-mannered jinn could hurt people by inflicting physical damage, causing illness, or taking control over a human's body. A human can be controlled by jinn under certain circumstances. The individual needs to be in a state of dha'iyfah (Arabic: ضَعِيفَة, "(mental) weakness"). Feelings of insecurity, mental instability, unhappy love and depression (being "tired from the soul") are forms of dha'iyfah. In that case, it is believed that an exorcism is required to save the person from the assaulting jinni. To protect oneself from jinn, many Muslims wear amulets with the name of God engraved on them. Jinn are also said to be scared of iron and wolves.

== Modern and post-modern era ==
=== Post-modern literature and movies ===
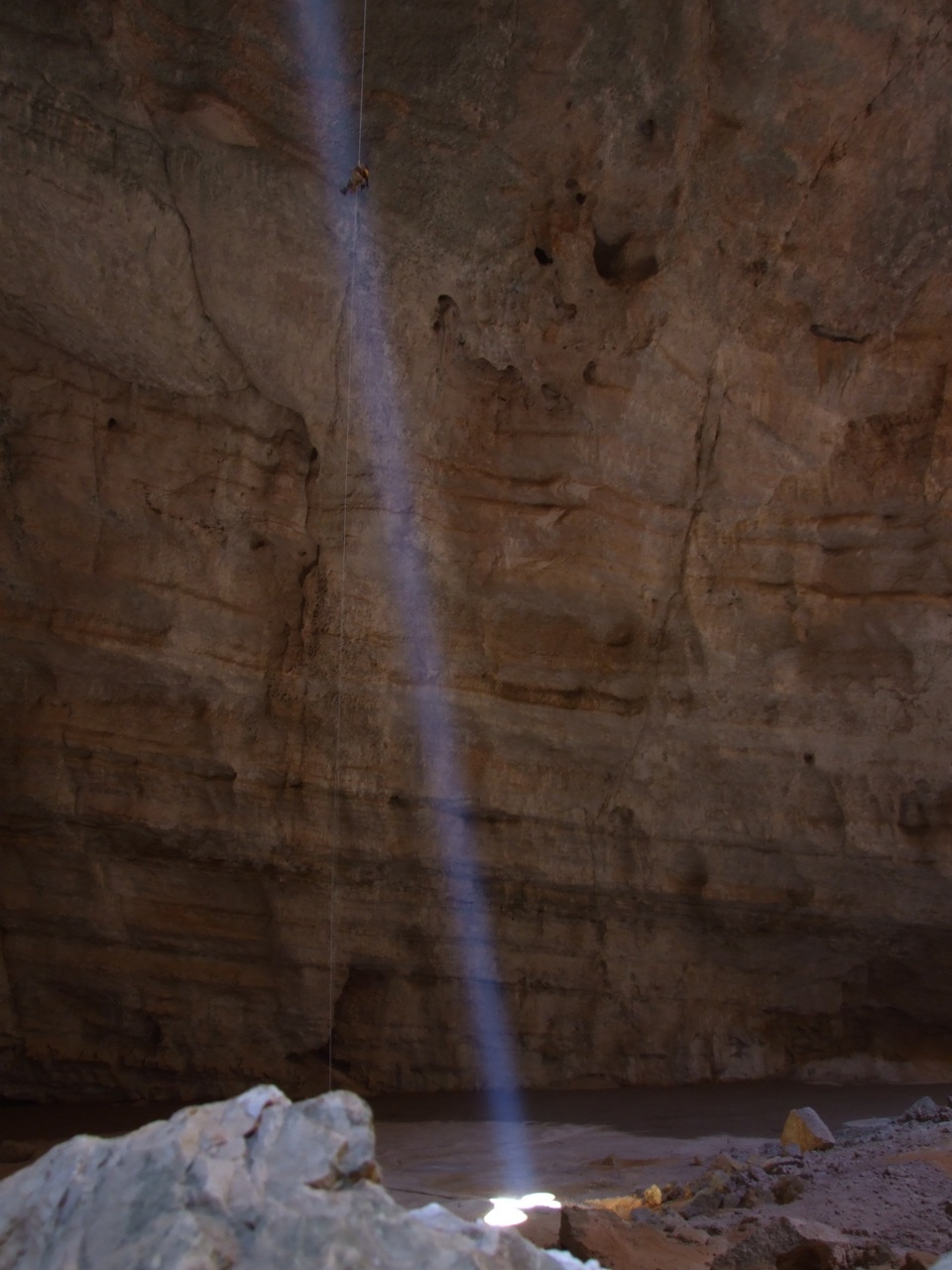
The cave chamber Majlis al Jinn, believed to be a gathering place of the jinn in Omani lore

Jinn feature in the magical realism genre, introduced into Turkish literature by Latife Tekin (1983), who uses magical elements known from pre-Islamic and Islamic Anatolian lore. Since the 1980s, this genre has become prominent in Turkish literature. The story by Tekin deals with folkloric and religious belief in a rationalized society.

Contrary to the neutral to positive depiction of jinn in Tekin's novels, since 2004 jinn have become a common trope in Middle Eastern horror movies. The presentation of jinn usually combines Quranic with oral and cultural beliefs about jinn. Out of 89 films, 59 have direct references to jinn as the antagonist, 12 use other sorts of demons, while other types of horror—such as the impending apocalypse, hauntings, or ghosts—constitute only 14 films. The popularity of jinn as a choice of monster can best be explained by their affirmation in the Quran. They are still a popular trope today. A study from 2020 shows that jinn are still the favorite horror element among teenagers. Jinn further feature in Iranian horror movies.

=== Prevalence of belief ===
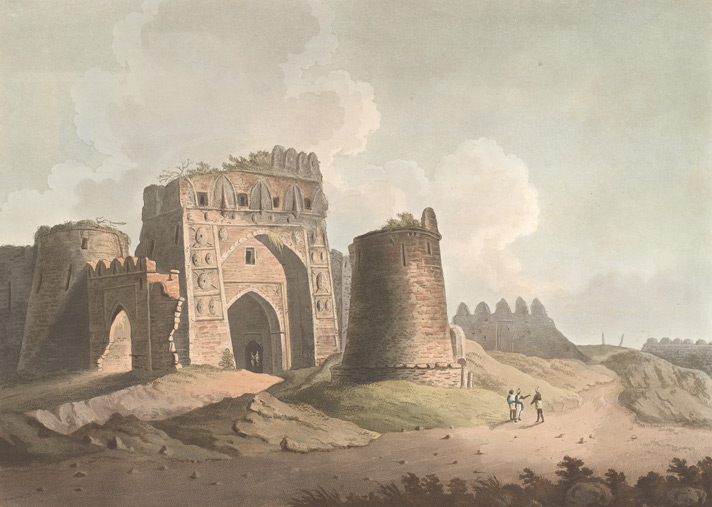
West Gate Of Firoz Shah's Cotillah. Firoz Shah Kotla is believed to inhabit saints from among the jinn. In the Indian Muslim consciousness, due to their longevity, the jinn connect centuries of Muslim experience. Since 1977 the place has become popular for jinn-saint-veneration.

Though discouraged by some teachings of modern Islam, cultural beliefs about jinn remain popular among Muslim societies and their understanding of cosmology and anthropology. Affirmation on the existence of jinn as sapient creatures living along with humans is still widespread in the Middle Eastern world (including Egypt), and West Africa, mental illnesses are still often attributed to jinn possession.

Since modern times, jinn have often been portrayed in a more negative light. After the failure of the rebellion against the East India Company, the Muslim elite regarded jinn-veneration in India as a superstitious belief that hindered the common people from instigating military power. Similarly, the Deobandi movement, although not denying the reality of jinn, mostly depicts jinn as malevolent beings who need to be avoided or exorcised. In modern Iran, (evil) jinn are often substituted by devils. Similarly, in many modern tales, the term jinn is used for div (demon), causing a shift in meaning. Nonetheless, traditional belief in jinn remains popular in Islamic culture. The negative evaluations of jinn are not static, but rather entangled with traditional and also positive depictions of jinn.

According to a survey undertaken by the Pew Research Center in 2012:

Country	% of Muslims who affirm a belief in the existence of jinn
Morocco	86%
Bangladesh	84%
Pakistan	77%
Afghanistan	70%
Turkey	63%
Iraq	55%
Indonesia	53%
Thailand	47%
Bosnia and Herzegovina	36%
Central Asia	15%

The amount of Muslims believing in jinn from Bosnia and Herzegovina is higher than the general European average (30%), although only 21% believe in sorcery and 13% would wear a talisman for protection against jinn; 12% support offerings and appeal given to the jinn.

Sleep paralysis is understood as a "jinn attack" by many sleep paralysis sufferers in Egypt, as discovered by a Cambridge neuroscience study by Jalal, Simons-Rudolph, Jalal, & Hinton (2013). The study found that as many as 48% of those who experience sleep paralysis in Egypt believe it to be an assault by the jinn. Almost all of these sleep paralysis sufferers (95%) would recite verses from the Quran during sleep paralysis to prevent future "jinn attacks". In addition, some (9%) would increase their daily Islamic prayer (ṣalāh) to get rid of these assaults by jinn. Sleep paralysis is generally associated with great fear in Egypt, especially if believed to be supernatural in origin.

Similarly, European patients with a Muslim background often attribute mental illnesses to jinn. The most common attributions to jinn are symptoms of hallucination and psychotic symptoms, but can also include mood disorders, obsessive-compulsive disorder (OCD), Capgras syndrome, and epilepsy. It has been noted that not all Muslims who believe in jinn believe they can possess people. Furthermore, belief in possession is not limited to Muslims. Contrary to the assumption that higher education is proportional to disenchantment, belief in jinn-possession may remain intact even after medical graduation.

In the process of objectification of Islam occurring especially among Muslims in the diaspora, folkloric depictions of jinn become less common and increasingly viewed as "local beliefs" or "un-Islamic". Stories and beliefs regarding jinn are often downplayed in favor of a normative approach to religion.

== Visual art ==
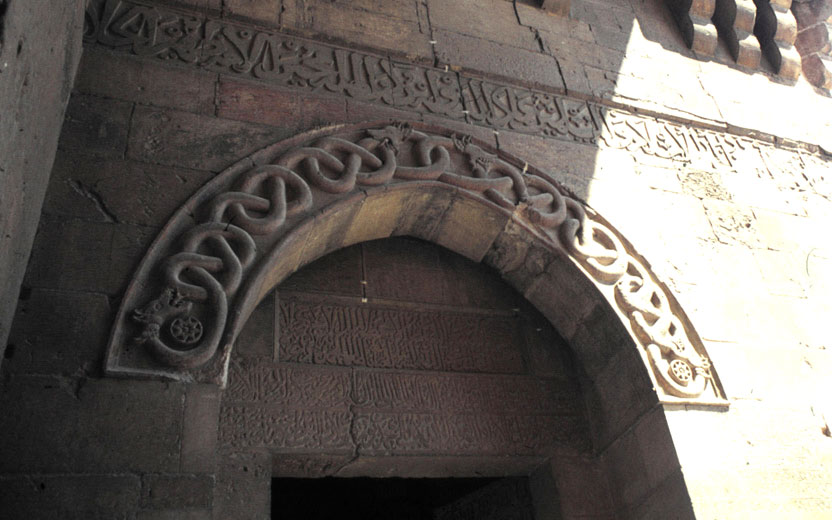
Ornamentation of intertwined serpents above the door of the Citadel of Aleppo

Although there are very few visual representations of jinn in Islamic art, when they do appear, it is usually related to a specific event or individual jinn.

Visual representations of jinn appear in manuscripts, and their existence is often implied in works of architecture by the presence of apotropaic devices like serpents, which were intended to ward off evil spirits. Lastly, King Solomon is illustrated very often as the commander of an army that included jinn.

=== Architectural representation ===
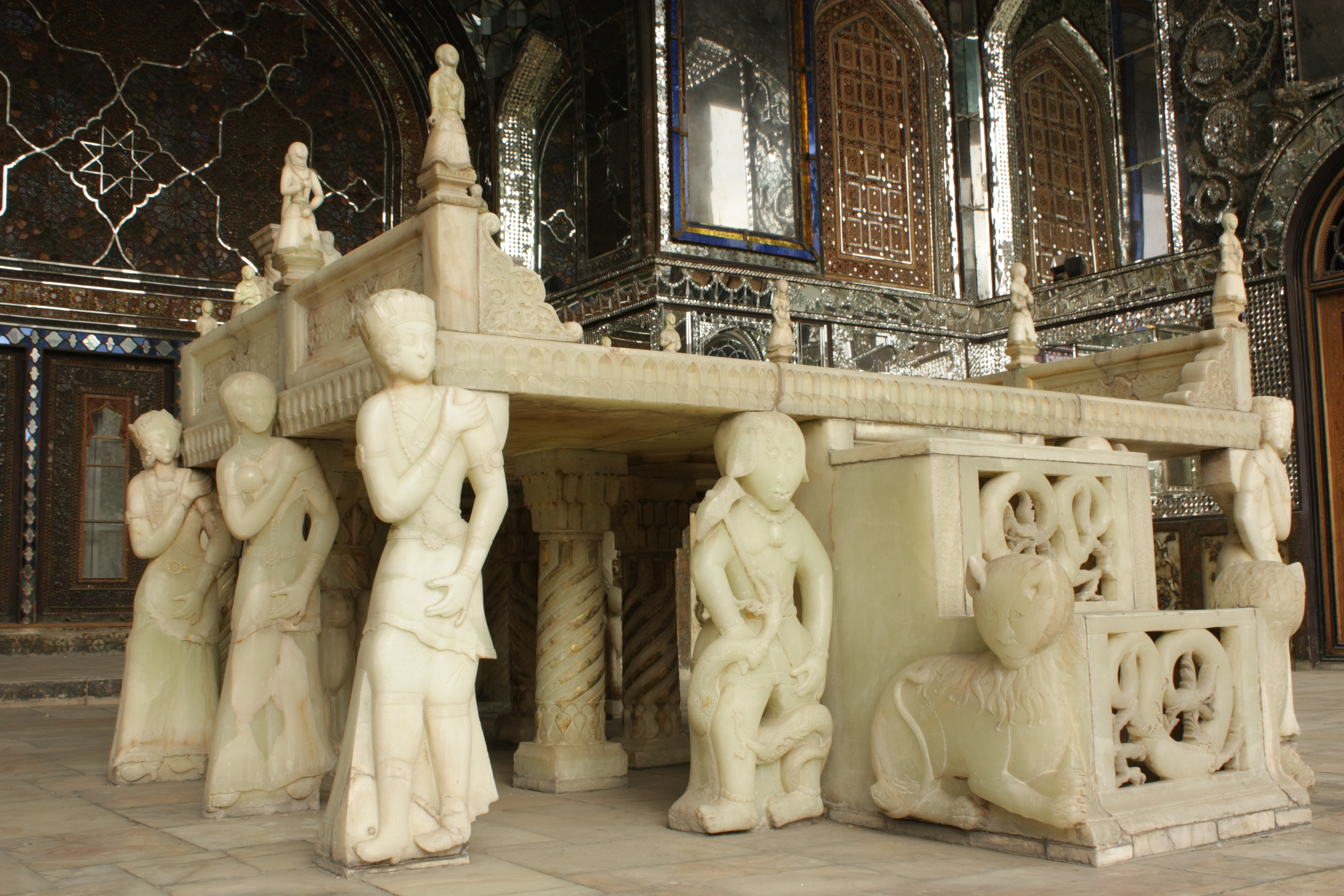
Takht-i Marmar, the marble throne supported by jinn and divs (demons), Golestan Palace created for Fath Ali Shah (r. 1797–1833)

In addition to these representations of jinn in vicinity to kingship, there were also architectural references to jinn throughout the Islamic world. In the Citadel of Aleppo, the entrance gate Bab al-Hayyat referenced jinn in the stone relief carvings of serpents; likewise, the water gate at Ayyubid Harran housed two copper sculptures of jinn, serving as talismans to ward off both snakes and evil jinn in the form of snakes.

Depictions of the jinn can also be found in the Rūm Seljuk palace. A phenomenal range of creatures can be found on the eight-pointed tiles of the Seal of Sulaymān device. Among these were the jinn that belonged to Solomon's army; as Solomon claimed to have control over the jinn, so did the Rūm Seljuk sultan that claimed to be the Sulaymān of his time. In fact, one of the most common representations of jinn are alongside or in association with King Solomon. It was thought that King Solomon had very close ties to the jinn, and even had control over many of them. The idea that a great and just ruler commands jinn was also extended to other emperors, such as Alexander the Great.

Given this association, jinn were often seen with Solomon in a princely or kingly context, such as the small, animal-like jinn sitting beside King Solomon on his throne illustrated in an illuminated manuscript of Aja'ib al-Makhluqat by Zakariya al-Qazwini, written in the 13th century.

=== Talismanic representation ===
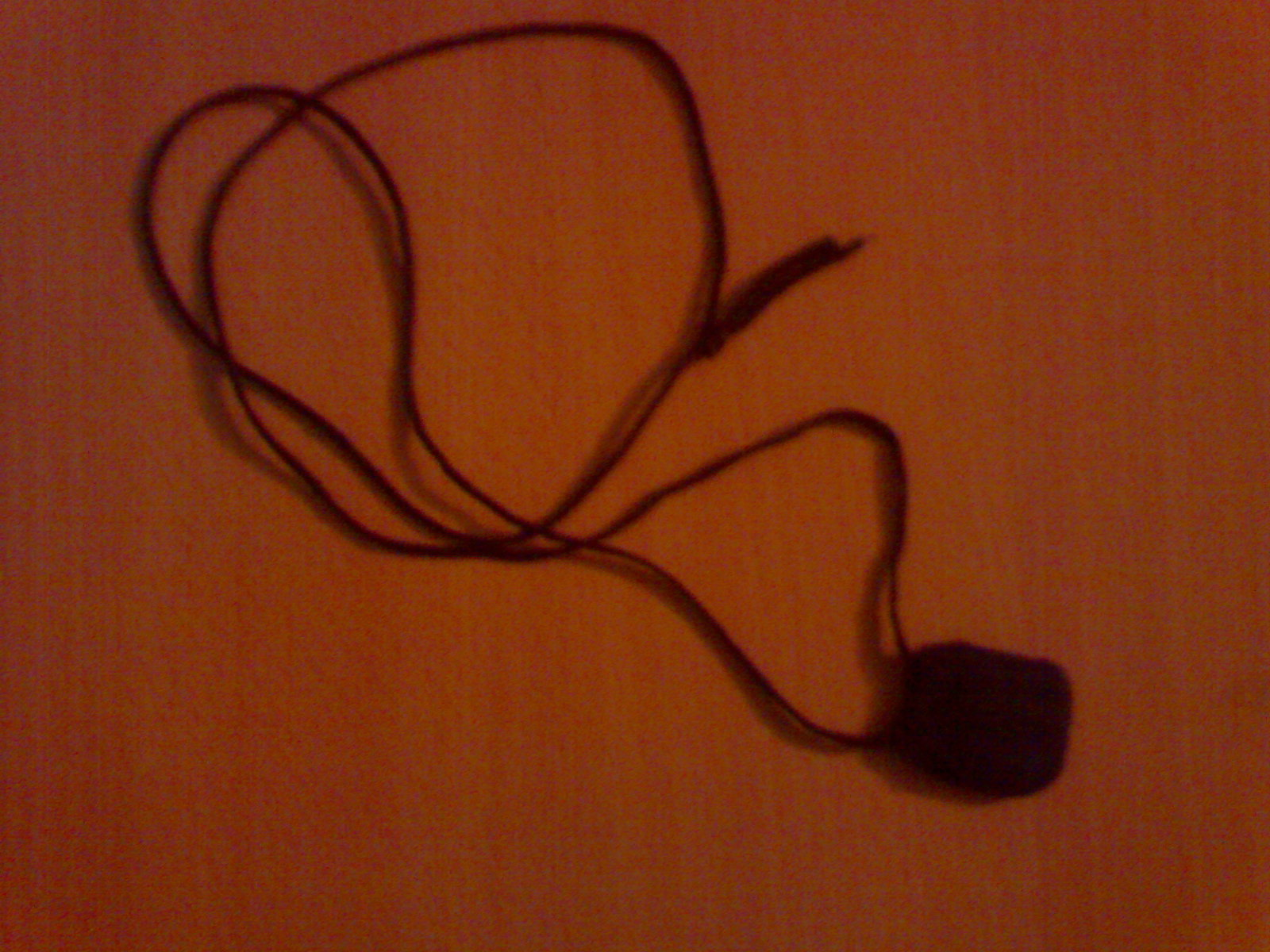
Image of a talisman (tawiz), supposed to ward off jinn, the evil eye, sorcery, and demons

The jinn had an influence on Islamic art through the creation of talismans that were alleged to guard the bearer from the jinn; these were enclosed in leather and included Qur'anic verses. It was not unusual for those talismans to be inscribed with separated Arabic letters, because the separation of those letters was thought to positively affect the potency of the talisman overall. An object that was inscribed with the word of Allah was thought to have the power to ward off evil from the object's owner; many of these objects also had astrological signs, depictions of prophets, or religious narratives.

=== In the Kitāb al-Bulhān ===
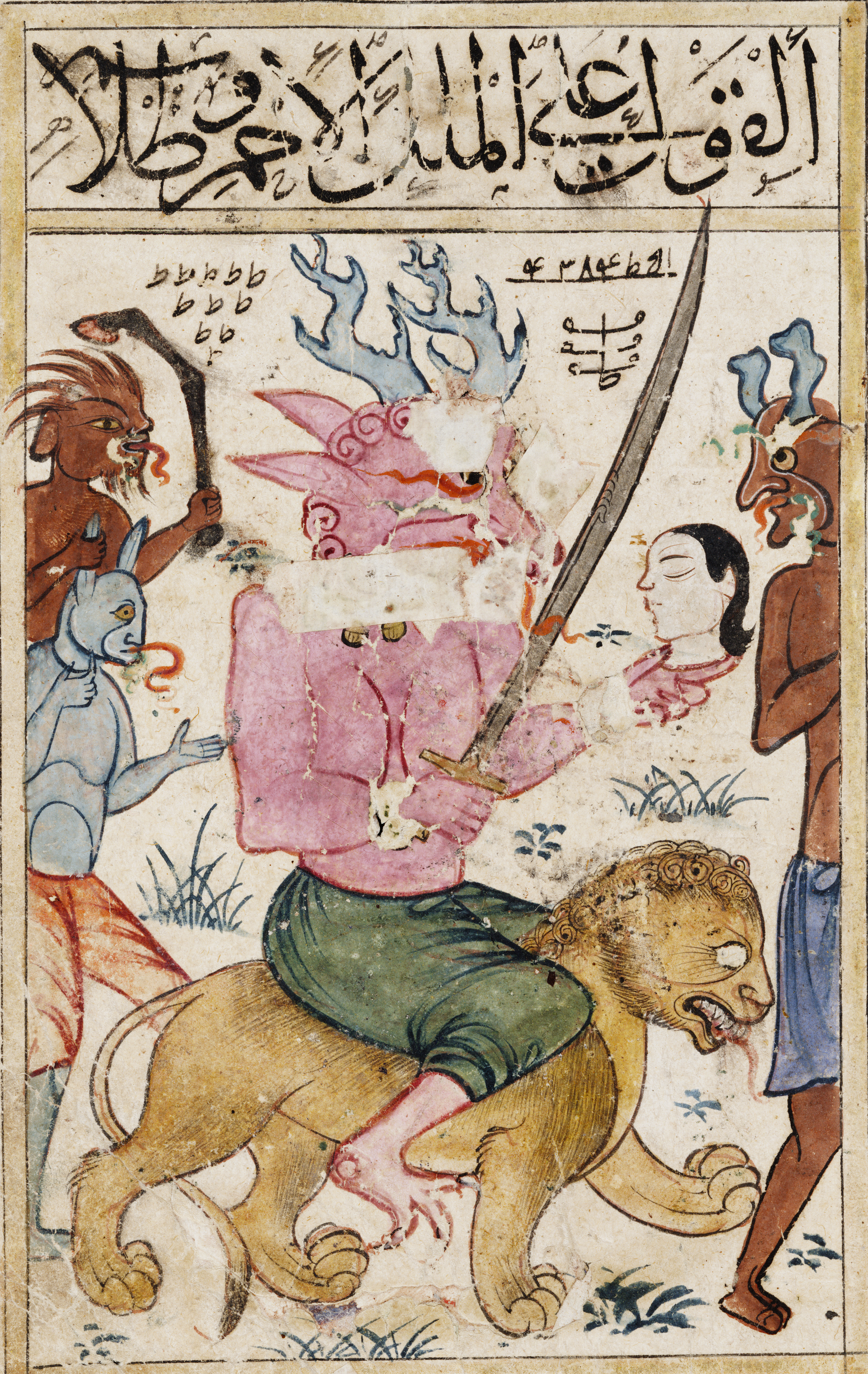
Al-Ahmar, the Red King of Tuesday. One of the Seven jinn-kings in the late 14th-century Book of Wonders

In the Book of Wonders compiled in the 14th century by Abd al-Hasan al-Isfahani, there are illustrations of various supernatural beings (demons, ʿafārīt, jinn, the evil eye, devils, lilith, celestial spirits, etc.).

Each celestial spirit is referred to as a "King of the Jinn", represented alongside his spiritual helpers and alongside the corresponding talismanic symbols. For instance, the 'Red King of Tuesday' is depicted in the Book of Wonders as a sinister form astride a lion. In the same illustration, he holds a severed head and a sword, because the 'Red King of Tuesday' was aligned with Mars, the god of war. Alongside that are illustrations of the 'Gold King' and the 'White King'.

Aside from the seven 'Kings of the Jinn', the Book of Wonders includes an illustration of Huma (Arabic: حمى), or the 'Fever'. Huma is depicted as three-headed and as embracing the room around him, in order to capture someone and bring on a fever in them.

=== The Seven Jinn Kings ===
The Seven Kings of the Jinn, known in Arabic as "al-Mulūk al-Sab‘ah," represent a complex hierarchical structure within Arab esotericism and folklore, even though they find no direct mention in the Quran. Rather than stemming from canonical revelation, these seven entities emerged from the fusion of local traditions across various regions of the Arab world, reorganized into a unified cosmological system wherein the kings take turns ruling the parallel realm of the Jinn to maintain spiritual order. Each sovereign is assigned exclusive dominion over a day of the week, a classical astrological planet, a color, and a natural element, through which they command vast legions of lesser jinn. Yet, this rule is not absolute: standing alongside each king is a designated celestial archangel who acts as both a wise counselor and a messenger of God’s commands, issuing directives and ensuring that the Jinn sovereign respects the boundaries established by the divine plan without wreaking havoc upon the human world.

Name	Color	Planet/star	Day	Angel	Place of origin/major cult place
Al-Madhab	Yellow	Sun	Sunday	Ruqya'il	Arabian Peninsula
Al-Abyad	White	Moon	Monday	Jibril	Arabian Peninsula
Al-Ahmar	Red	Mars	Tuesday	Samsama'il	Arabian Peninsula
Barqan	Blue	Mercury	Wednesday	Mikail	Arabian Peninsula
Shamharush	Purple	Jupiter	Thursday	Sarfya'il	Morocco
Zawba'ah	Green	Venus	Friday	Anya'il	Persia
Maymun	Black	Saturn	Saturday	Kasfa'il	Iraq

== Magical practices ==
Jinn might be invoked, along with demons and devils, for means of sorcery, incantation, protection, or divination. Soothsayers (kāhin) are credited with the ability to ask jinn about things of the past, since their lives are believed to last longer than that of humans.

Common beliefs regarding sorcery and commanding jinn are attested in ibn al-Nadim's Kitāb al-Fihrist. Since he locates such practises not as a branch of science or philosophy, but rather in a chapter about stories and fables, the author might not have believed in the efficiency of sorcery himself. He reports that the art of commanding jinn and demons traces back to Solomon and Jamshid. The first to have practised a lawful method of incantation is supposed to be Abū Naṣr Aḥmad b. Hilāl during the Umayyad period. Ibn Nadim explains lawful and unlawful subjugation of jinn and demons as distinct: While the former controls the jinn by the power of God's divine names, the latter pleases demons and devils by prohibited offerings and sinful acts. According to al-Jāḥiẓ, ibn Hilāl is said to have the power to summon demons and jinn and further claimed to have married a daughter of Satan and begotten a child.

There is evidence that subjugation of spirits, jinn, and demons was also cultivated by various Islamic authorities. Al-Ṭabasī, who was considered a reliable muḥadīth (scholar of ḥadīth) and pious ascetic, wrote an extensive treatise (al-Shāmil fī al-baḥr al-kāmil) on subjugating demons and jinn. According to Zakariya al-Qazwini, it was well known that jinn obeyed al-Ṭabasī. He gives the example that al-Ṭabasī demonstrated the jinn to the famous scholar Ghazālī, who saw them as shadows on the wall. He professes that jinn only obey when the individual turns away from the temptations of creation and devoting oneself towards God. The al-Shāmil gives detailed instructions for preparations of various incantations. Unlike, for example, in the writings of al-Razi, the al-Shāmil has no direct link to Hellenistic or Hermetic magic or philosophy. Magic was also used in the Ottoman Empire as evident from the Talismanic shirts of Murad III.

Related to the occult traditions in Islamic culture is the belief in the "Seven kings of the Week", also known as rūḥāiya ulia (higher spirits; angels) and rūḥāiya sufula (lower spirits; demons). These beings are, for example, invoked for the preparation of magic squares. This belief is attested by the Book of Wonders. It contains artistic depictions of several supernatural beings (demons, jinn, the evil eye, fever (Huma, Arabic: حمى), devils, lilith, etc.). Some of these beings indicate that the work connects Hebrew, Christian, and Islamic magical traditions. The original work is attributed to al-Bakhi, who founded a system of astrological magic based on Neo-Platonic thought. Although many pages are damaged, it is possible to reconstruct their meanings from Ottoman copies. Each king is depicted with helpers and associated talismanic symbols.

== Comparative mythology ==
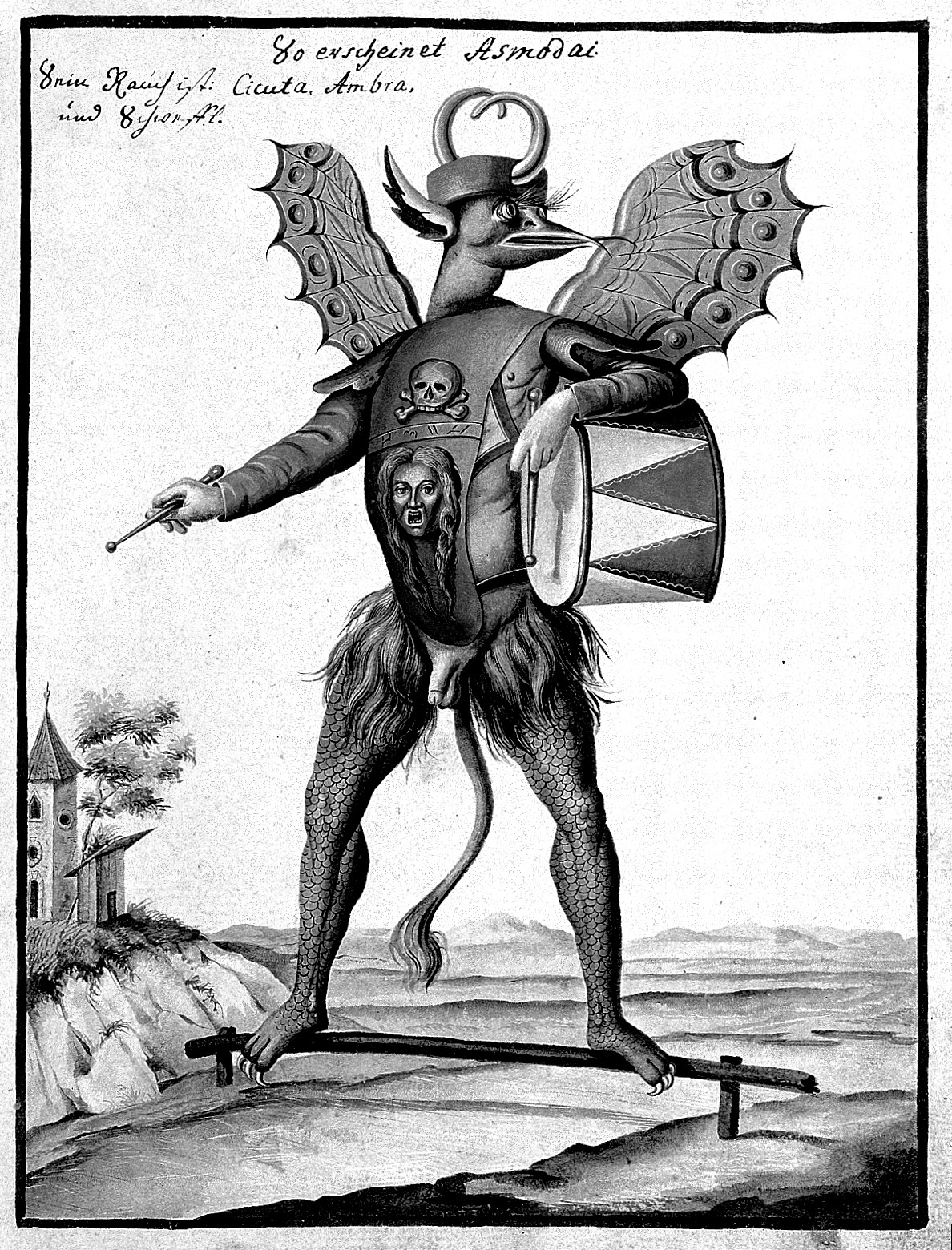
The sheyd אַשְמְדּאָי (Ašmodai) in bird-like form, with typical rooster feet, as depicted in Compendium rarissimum totius Artis Magicae, 1775

In comparative mythology and historical context studies, Quranic studies scholars discuss the relationship between Islamic notions of jinn and earlier ideas in Judaism, Christianity, Zoroastrianism, and pre-Islamic Arabia, of supernatural beings or preternatural creatures, especially those of angels, spirits, deities, and demons. It is widely agreed that the belief in jinn was a common element of the culture out of which the Quran came.

On a theological level, the Quranic portrayal of jinn as spirits converting to a one's religion rather than being demonized is not unique to Islam and bears resemblance to the portrayal of devas (particularly nāgas and yakshas) in Buddhism. Similar to Muhammad in the Quran, the Buddha is also credited with preaching to the spirits and deities of the previous religion, asserting that they are in need of salvation.

The jinn have been compared to the deities of Palmyra called gennaye. They functioned as protectors of places and people. Similar to the jinn of the modern Bedouin beliefs, the gennaye were imagined as beings similar to humans in terms of behavior and presence, and thus mirror social expectations of society in pre-Islamic Arabia.

The Islamic jinn also bear resemblance to the shedim of the Babylonian Talmud, such as the idea that jinn are subordinate to divine law and integrated into religious legal texts. The jinn frequently appearing as students of Muslim scholars, mirrors the description of shedim in the Babylonian Talmud. Like jinn, among a class of beings of Jewish mythology/belief (jnun, shedim, etc.), there is a tradition of ritual exorcism and negotiations that differs from that of traditional Jewish cure of spirit possession associated with ghosts (Dybbuk).

When compared to Christian tradition, one question has concerned the degree to which Quranic jinn might be compared to fallen angels in Christian traditions. However, issues with this view are that jinn are not identified as "angels" and that descriptions of angels do not involve their flying up the sky to eavesdrop on heavenly secrets (unlike jinn who do so in Surah 72). Pierre Lory states that jinn are "in no way comparable to angels", and must be understood as distinct from the Quranic motif of fallen angels.

Patricia Crone notes that, like jinn, the demons of the Testament of Solomon ascend to the firmament and eavesdrop on heavenly secrets; as did demons of Zoroastrian cosmology, who in addition encounter heavenly defense systems (as did Islamic jinn). Similar statements are also found in the Talmud (Berakhot 18b) and the 8th-century Scolion of Theodore bar Konai.

== Local jinn-beliefs ==
=== Yemen ===
==== Ghaddar ====
The ghaddars are a type of giant-looking Jinn that live in the Arabian Desert. They kidnap men and take them to the middle of nowhere, torture them, and eat their genitals.

==== Jinn of Poetry ====
The Hājis and Ḥalīla are friendly Jinn who accompany Arab poets in creating their poems, playing a role similar to the muses of Greek mythology.

==== ‘Udhrut ====
'Udhrut is a prankster jinn, usually having the appearance of a dog or a wolf with dark fur. He enjoys scaring people at night.

==== Delhan ====
The Delhan was a male djinn who lived on isolated islands and rode an ostrich. When people were shipwrecked on his island, he would capture them and have them eaten alive by the ostrich.

=== Iraq ===
==== S’iluwas ====
The S’iluwas is a type of jinn with her body covered with long hair, and she has pendulous breasts that reach her knees, she throws them over her shoulders to breastfeed her children, which she carries on her back.

=== Palestine ===
==== Amora ====
Amora is a type of female Jinn who goes in the night to the places where murders were committed and repeats the victim's last words while screaming and crying. It has similarities with the banshee, the latter goes in front of people's houses to cry and scream, warning them that death is near.

=== Morocco ===
==== ‘Aisha Qandisha ====
Aisha Qandisha is described as a beautiful woman with features that change according to the variants, some say she has the legs of a camel while others say she has the horns and legs of a sheep/goat. She lures men to have sex with them and then kills them.

==== Gravekeeper ====
The Gravekeeper in Arabic, commonly called Ḥārisat al-qubūr, is a female jinn who lives mainly in graveyards, she can take the form of a donkey, mare or a mule.

==== Ttab’a ====
Ttab'or, also called l-qraina, is a female jinn who has an appearance of a very normal and very charming woman but she brings bad luck to the people around her, especially her lovers, which can lead to their death. Even if she dies due to her own misfortune, she can come back to life in some variations.

== See also ==
- The Case of the Animals versus Man
- Daeva
- Demon (disambiguation)
- Genies in popular culture
- Ghoul
- Human–animal hybrid § Theriocephaly studies
- Ifrit
- Kobold
- Marid
- Nāga
- Nasnas
- Preta
- Qareen
- Shadow person
- Shedim
- Superstitions in Muslim societies
- Throne Verse
- Uthra
- Will-o'-the-wisp
- Yaoguai
- Yōkai
