= List of Sunday Without God episodes =

- Cover of the sixth and final DVD volume released by King Records in Japan on February 26, 2014.
- No. of episodes: 12 + 1 OVA

Release
- Original network: Tokyo MX
- Original release: July 6 – September 21, 2013

Sunday Without God is a 2013 fantasy, supernatural Japanese anime series based on the light novels written by Kimihito Irie and illustrated by Shino. Fifteen years prior to the start of the series, it is said that God abandoned the world. Around this time human beings had lost the ability to procreate while simultaneously a pandemic known as the Half-Dead Fever gripped the world, causing twenty thousand deaths and reanimating their corpses. Since there was no sure way to grant rest to an undead person, the gravekeepers started appearing and were able to put the dead to rest using special burial rituals only they can perform. Ai Astin is one such gravekeeper, and when she meets a mysterious stranger calling himself Hampnie Hambart, she slowly starts to learn the true nature of their world.

The anime is produced by Madhouse and directed by Yuuji Kumazawa, with series composition by Tomoko Konparu, character designs by Shinichi Miyamae based on the original designs by Shino, art direction by Junko Shimizu and sound direction by Satoshi Motoyama. The series premiered on Tokyo MX on July 6, 2013, with later airings on CTC, tvk, TV Saitama, Sun TV, KBS, AT-X, TV Aichi and BS11. The twelve-episode series was followed by an OVA episode on February 5, 2014. The series was picked up by Crunchyroll for online simulcast streaming. The Anime Network later obtained the series for streaming. King Records released the series in Japan on five Blu-ray and six DVD volumes between September 25, 2013 and February 26, 2014. The anime was licensed by Sentai Filmworks for distribution via select digital outlets and a home media release in North America and by Madman Entertainment in Australia and New Zealand.

The opening theme is "Birth" by Eri Kitamura while the ending theme is "Owaranai Melody wo Utaidashimashita." (終わらないメロディーを歌いだしました。; lit. 'I Sing This Never-ending Melody.') by Mikako Komatsu.

== Episode list ==
No.	Official English title (Note: All English titles are taken from Sentai Filmworks.) Original Japanese title	Original release date (Note: As Sunday Without God premiered in Tokyo MX's Saturday 25:30 (01:30am JST) time slot, the episodes technically aired the days following the ones listed.)	Refs.
1	"Valley of Death I"; Transliteration: "Shi no Tani I" (Japanese: 死の谷I)	July 6, 2013	
In medias res, Ai Astin confronts a mysterious stranger in her town who seemingly kills all the townsfolk. Unwilling to listen to the man's reasoning, Ai furiously attacks him, but he easily overpowers her. A flashback shows the 7-year-old Ai, being made the village gravekeeper upon her mother's death and had been carrying out her duty ever since, explaining that grave-keepers are the only ones that can help the dead rest in peace after God's Abandonment. While staying with her foster parents, Yōki and Anna the latter can't help but lament that Ai is unhappy with her life; although Ai believes that her father, Hampnie Hambart will visit one day. The next day, Ai grows concerned when she doesn't notice the townsfolk. She bumps into a white haired man who surprisingly learns that she is the village gravekeeper before he inquires about the whereabouts of a woman named Hana, to no avail. Introducing himself as Hampnie Hambart, Ai claims that he is her father much to his objection. Afterwards, Hampnie asks Ai for her gravekeeping services. While passing through the village, Ai terrifyingly notices all of the dead villagers before being approached by the wounded farmer, Yūto. Still walking despite a fatal gunshot to the head, Yūto defends Ai while drawing a gun on Hampnie. Hampnie easily kills Yūto with another head-shot, explaining that destroying the brain is the only way to be sure. Ai then charges at Hampnie in a fit of rage. She eventually wakes up and admits that Hampnie isn't her father, due to his cruelty before he tasks her with burying her entire village. Afterwards, Ai follows Hampnie out of town where he shatters her reality by revealing that she isn't a true gravekeeper since she possesses both parents and emotions, before introducing her to a true gravekeeper.
2	"Valley of Death II"; Transliteration: "Shi no Tani II" (Japanese: 死の谷II)	July 13, 2013	
Hampnie introduces Ai to Scar, a true gravekeeper and questions her on the whereabouts of Hana, but upon yielding no results, tasks her with burying the villagers. Scar reveals that Ai is indeed a gravekeeper since she already took care of the burials much to Hampnie's surprise. Afterwards, Hampnie mercilessly questions Ai on what she intends to do now that she has nowhere to go. Suddenly, Hampnie is shot by Julie Sakuma Dmitriyevich, his childhood friend who claims of wanting revenge for Hampnie "killing" his undead wife. Revealing his immortality, Hampnie deduces Julie's cowardice of wanting to die for "revenge" rather than by his own hand due to the pain of losing his family. Unwilling to listen, Julie threatens Ai and demands a duel from Hampnie, who seems to accept. Ai resolves to remain being a gravekeeper and leaves the village with Hampnie who disregards the duel with Julie. That night, Hampnie realizes that twelve-year-old Ai is an anomalous human/gravekeeper hybrid, since humans were denied procreation after God's Abandonment fifteen years ago. He explains his belief that God had grown weary of his duty and resorted to granting desires, the first being humanity's wish for eternal life followed by his own of true immortality to overcome his weak body. Sometime after the Half-Dead Fever Pandemic gripped the world whereby the dead started walking, and the mysteriously appearing gravekeepers were the only ones who could help the undead find peace. Hampnie adds that if a person dies a clean death, they barely change but over time they regress into a horrific monstrous state which is why he put down Julie's wife. Finally, Ai asks Hampnie why he killed the townsfolk and he reveals that she would eventually find out, along with the secret hidden within her village.
3	"Valley of Death III"; Transliteration: "Shi no Tani III" (Japanese: 死の谷III)	July 20, 2013	
A flashback shows Lady Alfa and her daughter Ai overlooking their village, with the former expressing a desire of changing their village into a place equivalent to Heaven where the dead can be happy. As their travels continue, Ai learns that Hana had seemingly abandoned Hampnie ten years previously and in addition that Hampnie is searching for a way to end his life, since the thought of being the last living human terrifies him. Just as Ai deduces that he merely acts cruel to hide his pain, they are discovered and Hampnie kicks Ai off the bridge into the river below. Ai awakens to find herself on the bank with Julie who reveals Hampnie had saved her from an ambush but was hence kidnapped. Julie also notes that Hampnie does not like meaningless violence and has his own sense of morality, and he shows Ai a picture of Hampnie's lover, Hana, who Ai shockingly acknowledges as her mother. Julie then calls Hampnie an undying monster, and Ai yells at him, saying that she wants to find Hampnie and to stop him from becoming even more twisted. Julie decides to help Ai rescue Hampnie and then they are approached by Scar. Elsewhere, Hampnie reawakens to find himself held captive by a band of undead psychopaths. Their leader, a man called Hiko starts taunting Hampnie, who reveals that his true wish is to live a happy life and then contently die with few regrets while surrounded by those who care for him. Just then, Scar and Ai come to Hampnie's rescue much to his objection. Ai walks into the room and reveals a shocking revelation to Hampnie that she is in fact the daughter of Hana and also of realizing that everyone in her village had died long ago but they had pretended to be alive for her sake. Finally, with backup from Julie, Ai and Scar incapacitate the undead psychopaths. After accepting this revelation, Hampnie and Ai have a tearful father-daughter reunion, with the former revealing his true name: Kizuna Astin and as his wish is finally fulfilled, Kizuna dies the death he always wanted. In the epilogue, Kizuna reawakens as an undead much to Ai's joy, and along with Julie and Scar, make their way back to Ai's village in the valley while spending as much time with each other as they can. Finally, at the village's graveyard, Ai buries her father, Kizuna next to her mother, Hana and mourns their deaths. With the burial over, Ai states to Julie and Scar that if God abandoned their world, she will become a true gravekeeper and save it.
4	"Ortus I"; Transliteration: "Orutasu I" (Japanese: オルタスI)	July 27, 2013	
Ai, Julie and Scar set out on their journey in a repaired minibus and notice a young man sleeping in the backseat who briefly wakes up and then passes out. As they continue on, Julie warns Ai to hide the fact that she is a gravekeeper from the world just as the young man, Kiriko Zubreska reawakens and explains that he is an Ortus governmental apprentice who had fled from thieves. With the bus still in need of repairs, Kiriko and Julie explain to Ai that Ortus is a city of the dead, consisting of almost one million undead inhabitants and due to its high population density, is equivalent to a small country. As Julie warns against Ai's desire to see the city, he explains that Ortus' inhabitants slaughter any gravekeepers who are drawn to the city, just as they pass a mass graveyard in the city outskirts littered with the graves of numerous gravekeepers. As they approach the entrance gates, a particular statue catches Ai's attention; Ortus' Guardian Goddess: Koroshiohake who Kiriko, explains wields the power of Death. Afterwards, Kiriko allows Ai and co. to stay in specially designated quarters for living humans within the city before they are met by city officials; the two-faced Pox and Wreck who thank the group for bringing Kiriko back and much to Julie's reluctance, allow them to enter the city. As they enter, Kiriko kindly asks that they leave once their minibus is repaired. The next morning, Julie prohibits Ai from setting foot outside their inn while simultaneously, Scar falls ill, and explains of hearing a voice calling out to her. That evening, Ai excitedly goes to explore the city using a mask she obtained from their inn's manager, and encounters a mysterious man wearing a lion mask who warns her to leave Ortus before its dark nature reveals itself. Elsewhere, Kiriko meets with Ortus' Princess Ulla Eulesse Hecmatika, and remarks that she will be the one to save the world.
5	"Ortus II"; Transliteration: "Orutasu II" (Japanese: オルタスII)	August 3, 2013	
After her brief encounter with the man in the lion mask, Ai meets up with Kiriko who insists on escorting her back to the inn. Having grown trusting of Kiriko, Ai reveals her anomalous nature as a gravekeeper and laments that her former village may have turned out a lot brighter if the townsfolk had adopted the ways of Ortus. Kiriko in turn reveals his true nature as an undead and tells Ai the story of his origin, whereby he was created by a witch using the living pieces of five friends who desperately wanted a child following God's Abandonment. Ai correctly deduces that Pox and Wreck are two of the five, with the others being Diva, Orius and Velera, who collectively are known as the "Fallen Five-Pointed Star". Upon returning to the inn, Kiriko enlists the help of Diva to have a look at the ill Scar. Diva's analysis reveals that Scar has a condition known as pseudocyesis and suspects that the voices Scar had been hearing are somehow connected. The following day, at Diva's request, Kiriko takes Ai to meet Princess Ulla and much to his surprise, finds that they both quickly develop a friendship. At the same time, a large mass of cloaked people approach Ortus. That evening, Julie and Ai discuss the disparity between the living and undead within Ortus. Just then, they are interrupted by the sound of the city's bells. Kiriko bursts into the room to inform them of the beginning of a ceremony to kill the group of one hundred and five humans who had approached the city and accept them into Ortus after having lost their will to live. This causes Ai to lament the contradiction this situation puts on her duty as a gravekeeper. While also thinking that Ulla is alive and the ceremony is being performed behind her back, Ai ignores Julie's questions and rushes to the citadel; unbeknownst to her, Ulla herself is the one performing the ceremony.
6	"Ortus III - The Mystery of a Lifetime"; Transliteration: "Orutasu III" (Japanese: オルタスIII)	August 10, 2013	
Ai arrives at the citadel and much to her horror witnesses Kiriko removing the covers blocking Ulla's sense of sight at which point her gaze extracts the life from the people, who are hence reborn as undead. Just as Ulla turns her gaze upon Ai, Julie rescues her at the last second, and are joined by the man in the lion mask. The man explains that Ulla is Koroshiohake, with her power of death being Ortus's dark nature. Ai refuses to believe that Ulla knows the true nature of her power, believing that Ulla had been deceived just as she was, at which point Kiriko appears and confirms this whilst accepting responsibility for the deception. Kiriko further explains his desire to protect Ulla from the harsh reality of their world ever since being appointed as her teacher by Ortus's elders and that he wants the deception to last until Ulla remains as the last living human, thus making her powers meaningless. Ai counters by remembering Kizuna's fear, but Kiriko remains adamant in his decision due to his love for Ulla and instead questions whether Ai would have had the same resolve. That same night, Ai visits Ulla in the castle and reveals the truth about Ortus and both of their powers, which is confirmed by a saddened Kiriko. Ulla explains to them of suspecting something had always been kept hidden from her, but chooses to contently accept everything; her ability, Kiriko's painful task, Ortus's nature and herself, only lamenting of being unable to truly interact with Ai as friends should, but embraces her nonetheless through Kiriko. Afterwards, Ulla takes Ai, Julie and Scar to visit her older sister Celica Hecmatika; a baby frozen in time. Kiriko explains that Ulla's mother hatefully wished death upon all humans at her deathbed, granting the unborn Ulla her power; which was rejected by her twin, Celica. Finally much to everyone's shock, Scar realizes Celica had been calling out to her, and upon Scar's touch, the child enters the flow of time. In the epilogue, Ulla reveals that she had known Celica was simply waiting for the right person at which point Scar adopts Celica as her daughter with Ulla's blessing. The next day, a mysterious youth with a ghostly companion observes Ai and co. as they leave Ortus and remarks that he and Ai are one and the same.
7	"Goran Academy I"; Transliteration: "Gōra Gakuen I" (Japanese: ゴーラ学園I)	August 17, 2013	
In a clock tower, the mysterious boy Alice Color introduces himself to Ai. A flashback shows Julie remarks Ai should try attending school, as they will all eventually close due to a lack of children. Julie has to temporary leave the sleeping Ai and Scar alone when he goes to make a phone call, and then he witnesses some strangers kidnapping Ai. Ai is taken to an unusual school, Goran Academy, where the students have special abilities. Due to her naïve personality, Ai initially sees nothing odd about the school, and the other students explain the true nature of Goran Academy. In the girls' bath, Ai reveals her human/gravekeeper heritage, while the others display their abilities too. In particular, Tanya Swedgewood tells her ability is 'Spirit Vision', which allows her to sense the shape of sounds and colors, since she is blind. She senses Ai's aura is like a rainbow at night. Alice and two other boys accidentally break into the bath, angering the girls. Alice then explains that they are digging an escape route through the sewerage. During the discussion, Dee Ensy Stratmitos, a female ghost who is Alice's accomplice, approaches them and responds to Ai that they were fated to meet.
8	"Goran Academy II"; Transliteration: "Gōra Gakuen II" (Japanese: ゴーラ学園II)	August 24, 2013	
Ai and the other students discuss an escape plan. Volrath Fahren and Hardy want to elope, and Rune Sagittarius aspires to go to Espia, an underwater city. However, some of them don't have a place to go, especially Tanya who refuses to leave due to her family issues. Nevertheless, Ai encourages Gigi Totogi, and the Gedenburg sisters, Mimieta and Memepo, to leave as a way to start a new life if they want, but Tanya is still unsure, and she envies Ai's willpower. Later after class, Ai talks with Tanya about chasing her own dreams and how her late parents unveiled her real world. Later, in the clock tower, Alice, Dee, and Ai confer that their dreams to save the world are different objectives. The next night, now with the iron grill broken down, the students prepare their escape; however, Ai chooses to stay behind for Tanya's sake. Fortunately, Tanya decides to deport Goran as well. Just as they all make it outside the campus, the headmistress Mageta encounters them and threatens to shoot. However, thanks to Alice's special ability, "Buzzer Beater," he is able to shoot down her bullets. Knowing she is outmatched, she allows the students to leave. In the epilogue, Julie arrives to pick up Ai, and brings the others along as well. Ai wonders where Scar is, and Julie answers she has abandoned Celica.
9	"Where Gravekeepers are Born"; Transliteration: "Sono Hasshō no Chibo no Kanshu" (Japanese: その発祥の地墓の看守)	August 31, 2013	
Following Celica's directions to Scar's location, Ai had sends a letter to Ulla and Kiriko explaining their recent adventures. After escaping Goran Academy, Tanya returns to her parents' home, as the other students decide to stay with Tanya's family until they decide their own destinations. Alice and Dee travel with Ai, Julie, and Celica. Driving through wastelands, Julie relates Scar's identity crisis, since grave-keepers are naturally emotionless individuals. Soon Dee realizes that the day before was Alice's birthday, much to Ai's dismay. Ignoring Alice's protests, Ai convinces him that it's important to celebrate one's birthday, and ask Julie to bake a cake. At night, Alice apologizes and thanks Ai for her kindness. Later, after arriving in a foggy ominous land known as the Story Circle - the birthplace of gravekeepers - they encounter numerous identical grave-keepers being "born" and passing by. Julie explains that identical grave-keepers are categorized as "families" (such as the Bezel and Beeny families), and he also notes that some grave-keepers are unique, like Ai's mother. As Dee decides to depart, Ai, Julie (carrying Celica), and Alice walk through the fog when they unknowingly got separated. They all began to see illusions within the fog of their lives' most significant memories: Julie sees his deceased wife and daughter, Alice notices a strange open window of his past, and Ai sees her parents Kizuna and Hana. Confused and depressed, Ai begins to lose hope until she spontaneously remembers what Kizuna and Hana taught her were the essentials in life. Finally they find Scar, and Julie reassures her how Celica is important to her, no matter if she is a grave-keeper, and he promises to protect her, while Ai and Alice think he is proposing to her. In the epilogue, Ai joins with Alice's quest to save his world, even though he believes it to be a small community, and they head for a town called Ostia.
10	"Class 3-4 I"; Transliteration: "San-nen Yon-kumi I" (Japanese: 三年四組I)	September 7, 2013	
A flashback shows the city of Ostia with an enormous Ferris wheel, and before killing his classmates, Alice explains that they are in a closed space where the world resets itself to default values as if destruction and change never happened. In the outside world, arriving at a desolated Ostia, Alice leads Ai, Julie, Scar, and Celica to the sealed Class 3-4, accessed through a school building. He explained they will not be able to leave until the seal over the city is broken, but Ai still chooses to help, and Julie and Scar state they will follow her wherever she goes. They are welcomed by the people of Ostia in an out-of-sync winter, and walking towards Alice's home they are greeted by Dee, who now has a physical form. Settling at their new home, they notice that the world is fourteen years ago in the past and question Alice, but he is reluctant to answer just yet. Another flashback shows the first time Alice and Dee left Ostia, and Dee is shocked to find herself as ghost. Later, Ai transfers into Class 3-4 and meet the classmates of Alice and Dee. Dee asks Ai if she has interest in any school activates, saying she may come to like staying in Ostia. Ai begins to realize that the world of Class 3-4 was created by a wish, which Alice confirms. That night, Alice finally explains Ostia is trapped in a temporal loop that resets every July 28th, and thus far Alice has brought a total of 35,695 living people into Ostia in order to shake up the world. He also reveals that Dee is probably preventing him from solving the temporal loop for unknown reason. The final scene is a flashback of Dee falling out a window.
11	"Class 3-4 II"; Transliteration: "San-nen Yon-kumi II" (Japanese: 三年四組II)	September 14, 2013	
Ai begins her investigation of Class 3-4. Alice confirms he occasionally brings clues that he found in the outside world, but Dee secretly keeps destroying them. When it is time for Ai's thirteenth birthday, Julie, Scar, and the students of Class 3-4 throw a party for her. Alice's gift to Ai is her repaired gravekeeper's shovel. He reminds her that she mustn't forget her duties as a gravekeeper, and remarks that people's wishes shouldn't always be granted, as it won't help them move forward. Alice mentions that Dee has changed as if she is hiding something, and she believes Class 3-4 is a better place than the outside world. As the months go by and Ai continues her investigation, she volunteers with Alice for the school's cultural festival which causes a slight time paradox. In the library, Ai is trying to find clues that Alice has left behind, but Dee usually finds them first and destroys them. Luckily, Ai manages to find a clue that Dee failed to notice. Reading an article concerning about a student from Class 3-4 who had died, but Dee catches her before she sees the name. Dee reveals that she died on July 28th and that Class 3-4 wished to reset time to prevent her death after she fell out a window, thus creating the temporal loop. Dee fears if that world were to disappear she will as well, explaining why she prevents anyone from resolving the temporal loop. Ai realizes that Dee is in love with Alice, and Dee asks her not to tell him. Dee feels that she is the only one who can truly understand Alice; however, when she witnesses Alice and Ai playing basketball together, she begins to feel envious and dejected.
12	"Class 3-4 III"; Transliteration: "San-nen Yon-kumi III" (Japanese: 三年四組III)	September 21, 2013	
Ai and Alice play basketball together, and when Dee overhears Alice's conviction to sacrifice anything he must to free Class 3-4, she decides she will create her own world by first destroying the old. In the morning, Ai hears from Dee that she is going to tell Alice the cause of everything, and asks her to go with her afterwards. At the basketball court, Ai meets up with Alice and wonders what will happen next. Dee then arrives in the classroom when she kills a male student, and the rest of the students are shocked when they see him revive. Ai and Alice then notice that Dee is forcing all the students of Class 3-4 to remember the incident of that day, and the world begins to reset itself drastically. They run for the classroom while Dee attempts to repeat that same day by jumping out of the window again as means to reset the world and herself. Meanwhile, Julie and Scar witness a fog-wave that threatens to swallow Ostia. Dee begins to fall, but just then an epiphany suddenly strikes her - it was actually Alice who died that day. Alice grabs her, then Ai and all of Class 3-4 pull them to safety in time. As the fog-wave retreats, Alice realizes the truth and remembers how he died while saving Dee from falling. He convinces Dee and the other students of Class 3-4 to depart for the outside world and experience real life, thanking them for caring about him so much. While the world is vanishing deliberately at last, Alice reveals he was buried by a gravekeeper in the outside world, and he implores a crying Ai to go as God's observer. In the epilogue, Julie, Scar, Celica, Dee, and all the citizens have evacuated to the outside world. Ai is seen in front of Alice's grave, and he appears next to her, asking why she had to save him (by having wished for his continued existence in the outside world), and she smiles.
13–OVA	"Memories"; Transliteration: "Kioku" (Japanese: 記憶)	February 5, 2014	TBA
This bonus episode is separated into three parts. In the first part (scene takes place in between episode 9 and 10), taking place before the characters reach Ostia, Ai and the others visit a hot spring. In the second part (scene takes place after in the middle of episode 9), Alice remembers the times he has killed his classmates and he encounters Hampnie Hambart, and a battle ensures. In the third and final part (scene takes place after near end of episode 2), Hampnie dreams of when he first met Hana, and he is then woken up by Ai.

== Home media ==
King Records released the series in Japan on five Blu-ray and six DVD volumes between September 25, 2013 and February 26, 2014. The complete series was released on Blu-ray and DVD by Sentai Filmworks in North America on October 21, 2014 and on DVD by Madman Entertainment in Australia and New Zealand on January 13, 2015. These releases contained English and Japanese audio options and English subtitles.

King Records (Region 2 - Japan)
Vol.	Episodes		DVD artwork	Release date	BD Ref.	DVD Ref.
Vol.	Blu-ray	DVD	DVD artwork	Release date	BD Ref.	DVD Ref.
1	1, 2, 3	1, 2	Ai Astin & Hampnie Hambart	September 25, 2013		
2	4, 5, 6	3, 4	Ai & Hampnie	October 23, 2013		
3	7, 8, 9	5, 6	Ai, Kiriko Zubreska & Ulla Eulesse Hecmatika	November 27, 2013		
4	10, 11	7, 8	Ai & Dee Ensy Stratmitos	December 25, 2013		
5	12, 13 OVA	9, 10	Ai & Alice Color	February 5, 2014		
6	—	11, 12, 13 OVA	Ai, Alice & Dee	February 26, 2014	—	

Sentai Filmworks (Region 1 - North America), Madman Entertainment (Region 4 - Australia & New Zealand)
Vol.	Episodes	Blu-ray / DVD artwork	BD / DVD Release date	BD Ref.	DVD Ref.
1	1-12 + OVA	Ai, Hampnie, Scar & Julie	October 21, 2014 (NA), January 13, 2015 (AUS)		
