= Jinn in horror films =

Jinn frequently feature as an element of horror in Middle Eastern movies. Jinn are popular in the horror genre since 2004. Many of these films were produced in Turkey. Iranian movies similarly utilize jinn as an element of horror. The trope often revolves around social conflicts and magical beliefs.

== Depictions ==
According to the Quran, God created entities beyond human's perception, including angels, Satan, and jinn. Since jinn are mentioned in the Quran, many Muslims take their existence for granted. As depicted in the Quran, the jinn are portrayed as created by God. The jinn can be good and evil, they are mortal and procreate their kind, and will go either to heaven or hell after death. However, the Quran describes the jinn only rudimentary, assuming the audience is familiar with the concept. Many beliefs about jinn predate Islam, thus, depictions of jinn in movies often combine elements of both Islamic beliefs and pre-Islamic oral culture.

In the world of Islamic horror, the jinn are usually inactive inhabitants of the earth until summoned by a sorcerer. It is this moral transgression that invites the jinn to the life of the people in the movie. Although they often act under command of a sorcerer or witch, in line with Islamic teachings, they do not know the unseen and can only operate in the mortal realm. This is further reflected on that the trope of jinn revolves around social transgressions than dealing with metaphysical evil, the latter more prominent in movies about Satan (šayṭān). Although the jinn, often summoned by pre-Islamic rituals or sorcery, appear to pose a challenge to Islam, the films assure that Islamic law protects Muslims from their presence. In the end, it is usually the one who summoned them in the first place who gets punished or suffers from the presence of jinn.

== Movies ==
Büyü (2004) is generally accepted as the first Islamic horror dealing with the concept of jinn as religious evil. However, 2006 marks the real start of the Turkish horror genre. Since then, jinn have become the favorite choice of monster. Haunted (2007) is about a jinni who felt in love with a girl and killed a man who wanted to marry her. In Dabbe 5: Zehr-i Cin (2014), the protagonist is haunted by a tribe of jinn, because of black magic. The plot revolves around the values of modern life and exploitation of the poor.

Similarly, jinn appear in Iranian horror movies despite a belittling of the popular understanding of jinn by an increasing number of Islamic fundamentalistic reformists. In the post-Iranian revolution psychological horror movie Under the Shadow the protagonist is afraid the jinn, who are completely veiled and concealed, and intrude into her life frequently. In the end, she is forced by the Iranian guards to take on a Chador, and thus becomes like the jinn she feared. The jinn symbolize the Islamic regime and their intrusion into private life, criticises the Islamic regime and patriarchal structures.
