= Normative religion =

Normative religion describes the social boundaries of religious identity at a macro-level, particularly for the named world religions. It has a broader definition than theological orthodoxy, including all those commonly accepted within the religion as a social group of mutual identification, for example with connected liberal tendencies. Normative religion is often contrasted with that of new religious movements, such that the Nation of Islam is considered outside of "normative Islam" and Messianic Judaism outside of "normative Judaism".
