= Sunday Without God =

Japanese light novel series

- Cover of Kami-sama no Inai Nichiyōbi volume 1

神さまのいない日曜日 (Kami-sama no Inai Nichiyōbi)
- Genre: Mystery, romance, supernatural
- Light novel
- Written by: Kimihito Irie
- Illustrated by: Shino
- Published by: Fujimi Shobo
- Imprint: Fujimi Fantasia Bunko
- Original run: January 20, 2010 – May 20, 2014
- Volumes: 9
- Manga
- Written by: Kimihito Irie
- Illustrated by: Abaraheiki
- Published by: Fujimi Shobo
- Magazine: Monthly Dragon Age
- Original run: October 9, 2010 – July 9, 2013
- Volumes: 4
- Anime television series
- Directed by: Yūji Kumazawa
- Written by: Tomoko Konparu
- Music by: Hiromi Mizutani
- Studio: Madhouse
- Licensed by: AUS: Madman Entertainment; NA: Sentai Filmworks
- Original network: Tokyo MX, CTC, tvk, TV Saitama, Sun TV, KBS, AT-X, TV Aichi, BS11
- English network: US: Anime Network
- Original run: July 6, 2013 – September 21, 2013
- Episodes: 12
- Original video animation
- Directed by: Yūji Kumazawa
- Written by: Tomoko Konparu
- Music by: Hiromi Mizutani
- Studio: Madhouse
- Licensed by: AUS: Madman Entertainment; NA: Sentai Filmworks
- Released: February 5, 2014
- Runtime: 24 minutes
- icon

Sunday Without God (神さまのいない日曜日, Kami-sama no Inai Nichiyōbi), also known as Kaminai (神ない) for short, is a Japanese light novel series written by Kimihito Irie, with illustrations by Shino. Fujimi Shobo has published nine volumes since January 2010 under their Fujimi Fantasia Bunko imprint. A manga adaptation by Abaraheiki began serialization in the November 2010 issue of Fujimi Shobo's Monthly Dragon Age. A drama CD was released by Marine Entertainment on December 29, 2010. A 12-episode anime television series adaptation produced by Madhouse and directed by Yūji Kumazawa, aired between July and September 2013.

== Plot ==
The story is set in a fictional world, where, fifteen years earlier, human beings lost the ability to have children and to truly die. Those who have died continue to exist, regardless of injury and decay. According to legend, God abandoned his creations but left them one final gift in the form of "gravekeepers," strange individuals with the ability to give rest to the living dead. Twelve-year-old Ai is one such gravekeeper. Her life changes forever when an immortal gunslinger named Hampnie Hambart massacres the residents of her small village. With no place to go, Ai is forced to rely on Hampnie, and she comes to learn the truth about him and her village.

Afterward, she sets out on a journey, performing her duties as a gravekeeper and striving to learn more about why the world has fallen into such a state, and she declares her desire to save the world God has abandoned. While on her journey, she encounters new people: Hampnie's childhood friend Julie, the gravekeeper Scar, a mysterious boy named Alice, and a ghostly witch named Dee.

== Characters ==
=== Main characters ===
Ai Astin (アイ・アスティン, Ai Asutin)
Voiced by: Aki Toyosaki (Japanese); Caitlynn French (English)
Ai is the main character and a twelve-year-old gravekeeper, taking on the job after her mother died. She is quite naïve but cares a lot about others. According to her late mother, her father was called Hampnie Hambart, and when she meets a man by that name, he claims he never had a daughter, and after encountering him she learns that all the villagers in her life were actually deceased and that Hampnie is her father. As the child of a gravekeeper and a human, Ai is arguably the last child born in the world, where ordinary children stopped being conceived three years before her birth. This and the fact that she has emotions is what makes her different from the other gravekeepers. She desires to save the world God has supposedly abandoned and leaves her village to set out on a journey.
Hampnie Hambart (ハンプニー・ハンバート, Hanpunī Hanbāto) / Kizuna Astin (キヅナ・アスティン, Kizuna Asutin)
Voiced by: Daisuke Namikawa (Japanese); Andrew Love (English)
Also known as "The Man-Eating Toy" (人喰い玩具, Hitokui Omocha), he is a strange albino man who suddenly appears in Ai's village one day. Upon arrival, he proceeds to shoot everyone in the village, sparing only Ai. Hampnie's goal in traveling is to find a woman named Hana. He became immortal fifteen years ago when God abandoned the world, and can regenerate after being injured. Although he has a cold personality, he claims to only use his gun in self-defense or to destroy the bodies of those who already died, as according to him, the dead have no place among the living. His wish was to die happily beside his family, and it is realized when he learns that Ai is his daughter with Hana after being tortured to death by Hiko and his gang. After awakening as an undead, Hampnie is buried by Ai beside Hana's grave at his request.
Scar (傷持ち(スカー), Sukā)
Voiced by: Mamiko Noto (Japanese); Genevieve Simmons (English)
An emotionless and skilled gravekeeper with no actual name, and she passes by Ai's village in search of the "dead". She eventually joins Ai on her journey. As the group stops over at Ortus, she also saves Ulla's older sister Celica, a baby frozen in time, and adopts her as a daughter. Scar begins to show more emotions when Julie vows to take care of her, having wished to become human while at Story Circle, a birthplace for gravekeepers.
Julie Sakuma Dmitriyevich (ユリー・サクマ・ドミートリエビッチ, Yurī Sakuma Domītoriebitch) (Note: Crunchyroll and Hulu's subtitles spell his name as "Julie," while Sentai Filmworks' English dub gives his name as "Yuri". Additionally, in the first seven novels and the anime series, his patronymic is rendered as ドミートリエビッチ in katakana, while the eighth novel and the Kadokawa Bunko editions of the first three novels render it as ドミトリエヴィヒ.)
Voiced by: Keiji Fujiwara (Japanese); David Matranga (English)
Hampnie's childhood friend. Julie hid his wife away from the gravekeepers after she died due to illness to prevent her burial. Hampnie caught up to him and destroyed her body, and after the death of his child, he seeks revenge against Hampnie, although Hampnie claims that Julie, knowing of Hampnie's immortality, is actually suicidal and desires to be killed by him. After Hampnie is put to rest, Julie starts traveling alongside Ai and Scar, and later bonds with Scar as they care for baby Celica together.
Alice Color (アリス・カラー, Arisu Karā)
Voiced by: Kōki Uchiyama (Japanese); Mike Yager (English)
A young boy Ai meets while at Goran Academy, and he seems to have an interest in her. Despite having the same wish as Ai, he wants to save his world by destroying it. He also has a special ability "Buzzer Beater" that allows him to hit any targets that he shoots. Alice and Dee are first seen observing Ai in Ortus, and later they join Ai on her journey, and he invites Ai and the others to a desolated town, Ostia, and they enter into the world of Class 3-4. Fourteen years ago, while preparing for their school's cultural festival, Dee fell from a window and Alice rescued her, and he ended up falling from the window instead, which resulted in his death. This caused Class 3-4 to make a wish for their happy days to be eternal and as a result, it created a delusional world that resets about once every year on July 28, and Alice wants to save his classmates who are trapped by destroying the false world. Due to Alice being dead and his body having been buried by a gravekeeper and thus not being bound to the sealed city like the rest of his classmates, he has a physical form outside the sealed city, unlike Dee, who is forced to take a ghostly form. He is saved at the end of the anime series by Ai, who wished she could save him from perishing. He grows close to Ai over the course of the series, encouraging her in her goal to save the world.
Dee Ensy Stratmitos (ディー・エンジー・ストラトミットス, Dī Enjī Sutoratomittosu)
Voiced by: Eri Kitamura (Japanese); Luci Christian (English)
A female ghost is known as the "Witch of the West" who travels the world helping or giving people advice and information, secretly whispering to others and compelling them, and she accompanies Alice in his quest to save their world of Class 3-4. In the sealed city of Ostia, Dee regains her physical form, as her physical body is trapped within the seal. While searching for the answer to the time loop Class 3-4 is trapped in, Dee found a newspaper said that one student from Ostia died while sixteen others went missing. There she remembered that Alice died while saving her from falling out a window, and thus the rest of Class 3-4 wished the incident had never happened and their peaceful days could last forever. She prevents Alice from finding a way to free Class 3-4 so that she can stay with him forever, leading Ai to believe she is in love with Alice.

=== Ortus ===
Kiriko Zubreska (キリコ・ズブレスカ, Kiriko Zuburesuka)
Voiced by: Tetsuya Kakihara (Japanese); Tyler Galindo (English)
An apprentice at a government office in Ortus, a city for the deceased. He was first found asleep in Julie's van while Julie, Ai, and Scar are on their journey. He is also close to Princess Ulla, being a schoolmate and a teacher to her. He is actually made of body parts from five people, born from their wishes of having a child being granted by a witch. He also ages much slower than a normal human and has knowledge from the minds of the five people he was made from. He is devoted to Ulla and has deep feelings for her.
Ulla Eulesse Hecmatika (ウッラ・エウレウス・ヘクマティカ, Urra Eureusu Hekumatika)
Voiced by: Mikako Komatsu (Japanese); Emily Neves (English)
Princess of Ortus, also known as the Idol of Murder. Her eyes are blindfolded and her body is fully clothed. Just before her birth, she had accepted her mother's wish to kill all human beings before her death, and anybody that she sees, speaks to or touches will be killed by her thus, preventing her to have normal interaction with the living. She instead writes down her thoughts or uses Kiriko as a communication medium. Even when Ai tells her the truth of her powers, she is still happy in Ortus, and she cares for Kiriko greatly.
Wreck (強攻(レックス), Rekkusu)
Voiced by: Kenji Hamada (Japanese); Jay Hickman (English)
The ambassador of special foreign affairs of Ortus. One of the five people Kiriko was made from.
Pox (悪疫(ポックス), Pokkusu)
Voiced by: Nanako Mori (Japanese); Shelley Calene-Black (English)
The vice-captain of the Ortus Imperial Guard. One of the five people Kiriko was made from.
Diva (紅雪(ディーヴァ), Diiva)
Voiced by: Ryōka Yuzuki (Japanese); Joanne Bonasso (English)
The royal doctor of Ortus. One of the five people Kiriko was made from.

=== Goran Academy ===
Tanya Swedgewood (ターニャ・スウェッジウッド, Tānya Suwejjiuddo)
Voiced by: Asami Imai (Japanese); Jad Saxton (English)
A student at Goran Academy, a school for children with special powers and from which they are not allowed to leave. Tanya was born blind but due to her wish she has the ability to use "Spirit Vision," which allows her to hear the sounds of places and things, and can even sense the shape of color. After escaping Goran Academy, she allows the other students to stay at her parents' household until they decide what to do furthermore.
Volrath Fahren (ヴォルラス・ファーレン, Vorurasu Fāren)
Voiced by: Sayuri Hara (Japanese); Kara Greenberg (English)
A student at Goran Academy. Volrath possesses excessive destructive strength.
Hardy (ハーディ, Hādi)
Voiced by: Kengo Kawanishi (Japanese); Clint Bickham (English)
A student at Goran Academy who is also Volrath's boyfriend. He has the ability to consume inorganic materials for his own sustenance.
Gigi Totogi (ギーギー・トートギー, Gīgī Tōtōgi)
Voiced by: Kotori Koiwai (Japanese); Shannon Emerick (English)
A student at Goran Academy. His age is actually twenty-two, but since he has been asleep for ten years, he has the appearance of a twelve-year-old boy.
Mimieta Gedenburg & Memepo Gedenburg (ミミータ・ゲーデンバーグ、メメポ・ゲーデンバーグ, Mimīta Gēdenbāgu, Memepo Gēdenbāgu)
Voiced by: Ai Kakuma (Japanese); Meg McDonald (English)
Twin students at Goran Academy. Mimi is the first daughter, and Meme is the second daughter. Claiming to not be actual twins, but have multiple personalities, due to the third sister, Momo, who died and later buried by a gravekeeper, and who remains alive within them. They were born into a noble family.
Rune Sagittarius (ルン・サジタリウス, Run Sajitariusu)
Voiced by: Minami Takahashi (Japanese); Sarah Salimi (English)
A student at Goran Academy, and she can breathe underwater. She wants to go to an underwater city called Espia.
Mageta Hausend (マギータ, Magīta)
Voiced by: Yuka Keichō (Japanese); Angela Foster (English)
An instructor at Goran Academy. She is stern and disciplines students with her revolvers.

=== Minor characters ===
Hana (ハナ) / Alfa (アルファ, Arufa)
Voiced by: Rina Satō (Japanese); Allison Sumrall (English), Yūko Gotō (drama CD)
The woman Hampnie Hambart is searching for. Hampnie describes her as someone who is quite sensitive, loves eating, and light-brown hair. She is eventually revealed to be the same person as Alfa, Ai's mother, and the first gravekeeper. Hana's dream was to have the world turn into a place for Heaven and then passed it down to Ai. She died when Ai was seven years old.
Yōki (ヨーキ, Yooki) & Anna (アンナ, Anna)
Yōki: Voiced by: Hirofumi Nojima (Japanese); Kyle C. Jones (English)
Anna: Voiced by: Akeno Watanabe (Japanese); Shelley Calene-Black (English)
A married couple in Ai's village who acted as Ai's foster parents.
Yuuto (ユート)
Voiced by: Eiji Maruyama (Japanese); John Swasey (English)
A blacksmith in Ai's village.
Hikotsu (ヒコーツ)
Voiced by: Hiroyuki Yoshino (Japanese); Kalob Martinez (English)
An undead who obsesses over Hampnie.

== Media ==
=== Light novels ===
Kami-sama no Inai Nichiyōbi began as a light novel series written by Kimihito Irie, with illustrations by Shino. Irie entered the first novel in the series, originally titled Nichiyō no Hitotachi (日曜の人達; lit. People of Sunday), in Fujimi Shobo's 21st Fantasia Prize in 2009 and the novel won the Grand Prize. The first novel was published by Fujimi Shobo on January 20, 2010, under their Fujimi Fantasia Bunko imprint, and the ninth and final volume was released on May 20, 2014.

==== Novel list ====
No.	Title	Japanese release date	Japanese ISBN
1	Kami-sama no Inai Nichiyōbi (神さまのいない日曜日)	January 20, 2010	978-4-8291-3477-1
2	Kami-sama no Inai Nichiyōbi II (神さまのいない日曜日II)	May 20, 2010	978-4-8291-3521-1
3	Kami-sama no Inai Nichiyōbi III (神さまのいない日曜日III)	October 20, 2010	978-4-8291-3579-2
4	Kami-sama no Inai Nichiyōbi IV (神さまのいない日曜日IV)	February 19, 2011	978-4-8291-3612-6
5	Kami-sama no Inai Nichiyōbi V (神さまのいない日曜日V)	June 18, 2011	978-4-8291-3649-2
6	Kami-sama no Inai Nichiyōbi VI (神さまのいない日曜日VI)	November 19, 2011	978-4-8291-3699-7
7	Kami-sama no Inai Nichiyōbi VII (神さまのいない日曜日VII)	April 20, 2012	978-4-8291-3738-3
8	Kami-sama no Inai Nichiyōbi VIII (神さまのいない日曜日VIII)	July 20, 2013	978-4-8291-3912-7
9	Kami-sama no Inai Nichiyōbi IX (神さまのいない日曜日IX)	May 20, 2014	978-4-04-070110-3

=== Manga ===
A manga adaptation illustrated by Abaraheiki was serialized between the November 2010 and August 2013 issues of Fujimi Shobo's Monthly Dragon Age, sold between October 9, 2010, and July 9, 2013, comprising 28 chapters, and it covers the events of the first novel. Four tankōbon volumes were released between June 7, 2011, and August 9, 2013.

==== Volume list ====
No.	Japanese release date	Japanese ISBN
1	June 7, 2011	978-4-04-712728-9
01: "People of Sunday" (日曜の人達); 02: "For Those Who Love Legends I" (神話を愛する人のために I); 03: "For Those Who Love Legends II" (神話を愛する人のために II); 04: "For Those Who Love Legends III" (神話を愛する人のために III); 05: "For Those Who Love Legends IV" (神話を愛する人のために IV); 06: "For Those Who Love Legends V" (神話を愛する人のために V)
2	April 5, 2012	978-4-04-712779-1
07: "For Those Who Love Legends VI" (神話を愛する人のために VI); 08: "For Those Who Love Legends VII" (神話を愛する人のために VII); 09: "For Those Who Love Legends VIII" (神話を愛する人のために VIII); 10: "For Those Who Love Legends IX" (神話を愛する人のために IX); 11: "Test Me, Birth and Honor I" (私を試す、うまれと誉れ I); 12: "Test Me, Birth and Honor II" (私を試す、うまれと誉れ II); 13: "Test Me, Birth and Honor III" (私を試す、うまれと誉れ III)
3	November 7, 2012	978-4-04-712837-8
14: "Test Me, Birth and Honor IV" (私を試す、うまれと誉れ IV); 15: "Test Me, Birth and Honor V" (私を試す、うまれと誉れ V); 16: "Test Me, Birth and Honor VI" (私を試す、うまれと誉れ VI); 17: "Test Me, Birth and Honor VII" (私を試す、うまれと誉れ VII); 18: "Test Me, Birth and Honor VIII" (私を試す、うまれと誉れ VIII); 19: "Test Me, Birth and Honor IX" (私を試す、うまれと誉れ IX); 20: "Test Me, Birth and Honor X" (私を試す、うまれと誉れ X); 21: "Test Me, Birth and Honor XI" (私を試す、うまれと誉れ XI)
4	August 9, 2013	978-4-04-712888-0
22: "Memories I" (追憶 I); 23: "Memories II" (追憶 II); 24: "Memories III" (追憶 III); 25: "Memories IV" (追憶 IV); 26: "Memories V" (追憶 V); 27: "Memories VI" (追憶 VI); 28: "Memories VII" (追憶 VII)

=== Anime ===
A 12-episode anime television series adaptation, produced by Madhouse and directed by Yūji Kumazawa aired between July 6 and September 21, 2013. An original video animation episode included on the fifth Blu-ray was originally scheduled for release on January 22, 2014, but was delayed to February 5, 2014. The opening theme is "Birth" by Eri Kitamura and the ending theme is "Owaranai Melody o Utaidashimashita." (終わらないメロディーを歌いだしました。; "Begun to Sing an Endless Melody.") by Mikako Komatsu.

Crunchyroll streamed the series in North America with English subtitles. The anime has been licensed by Sentai Filmworks in North America, and was also streamed on Anime Network. After the acquisition of Crunchyroll by Sony Pictures Television, Sunday Without God, among several Sentai Filmworks titles, was dropped from the Crunchyroll streaming service on March 31, 2022.

==== Soundtrack ====
The background music for the anime was composed by Hiromi Mizutani, and the original soundtrack, titled Requiem, was released by King Records on September 25, 2013. The first printing of the original soundtrack also included an image song titled "Hohoemi no Ame" for Ai Astin, sung by her voice actress Aki Toyosaki.

Original soundtrack: Requiem
No.	Title	Length
1.	"Lost World"	3:31
2.	"Transfiguration"	1:41
3.	"Impatience"	2:15
4.	"Melancholic"	2:03
5.	"Loneliness"	2:06
6.	"Ortus"	1:57
7.	"Valley of Death"	2:00
8.	"Conflict"	1:45
9.	"Fate"	1:43
10.	"Mystery Place"	1:43
11.	"Warmth"	2:06
12.	"Rhythm of a Blue Sky"	1:55
13.	"Late Riser"	1:35
14.	"Pleasure"	1:48
15.	"Sulk"	1:33
16.	"Reminiscence"	1:38
17.	"Farewell"	1:35
18.	"Calmly"	2:08
19.	"Death and Despair"	2:07
20.	"Gloomy Secret"	1:55
21.	"Undertaker"	1:44
22.	"Dampish"	1:56
23.	"Pressure"	1:44
24.	"Shock"	1:57
25.	"Dread"	2:12
26.	"Ominous Premonition"	1:55
27.	"Dark of Valley"	2:17
28.	"Battle"	2:35
29.	"Tense Atmosphere"	1:51
30.	"Transitoriness"	2:16
31.	"Utopia"	1:51
32.	"Solvation"	2:04
33.	"Future World"	2:20
34.	"Blessing"	2:33
Total length:		68:19

"Hohoemi no Ame" for Ai Astin
No.	Title	Length
1.	"Hohoemi no Ame (微笑みの雨; lit. 'Rain of Smiles')" (Performed by Aki Toyosaki)	5:47
2.	"Hohoemi no Ame (微笑みの雨; lit. 'Rain of Smiles') (Instrumental)"	5:46
Total length:		11:33
