= Gravekeeper (mythology) =

Monster protector of graves in Moroccan folklore

The Gravekeeper from Moroccan folklore widespread in the Maghreb who protects graves from ill-intentioned individuals and tests the good faith of men. The name Gravekeeper It is the English translation of the Arabic word Ḥārisat al-qubūr which is used as a general designation for a female monster with the appearance of a mule/donkey or mare, as the name varies from one region of Morocco to another.

The names of this mythological figure vary depending on the region and language:

- Souss: Tnkmart Namsdalen / Tagmart n Ismdal (the cemetery mare) and Taserdunt n Ismdal / Tassardount N'issamdal (the cemetery donkey).
- Rif: Tasadunt imdran (the graveyard mule).
- Fez-Meknes: Bghilt Lil (the little mule of the night).
- Arabic: Baghlat al-Qubur (the mule of the graves).

== Origin of the Legend and Metamorphosis ==
According to a legend originating in the Souss region (southern Morocco), the creature was once a human woman who had been happily married. Upon her husband’s death, she entered the traditional mourning period (iddah), a time during which Islamic tradition and religion require a widow to wear white clothing and refrain from any relations with other men for a duration of four months and ten days. Unable to endure the solitude before this prescribed period had elapsed, the woman committed the sin of adultery (zina) by taking a lover. As divine punishment for this act of disobedience and disrespect toward the memory of her deceased husband, she was cursed and transformed into a monster girl capable of assuming the form of a mule, a donkey, or a mare.

== Appearance ==
The Gravekeeper is described as a woman of extraordinary beauty with very fair skin, capable of transforming herself completely, or altering specific parts of her body into those of a mule, a donkey, or a mare. In her full equine form, the creature attains a size far greater than that of an ordinary animal, accompanied by a terrifying strength. She wears long chains on her neck, wrists and ankles that remain visible even after her limbs have transformed into hooves, while her eyes burn intensely, like lava.

== Attack Mode ==
During the day, the Gravekeeper hides and sleeps within graves, attacking only if disturbed. At nightfall, she emerges to roam the graveyards sometimes venturing into nearby villages or along adiacent roads before returning to her shelter at dawn. Even if she is not directly sighted, her presence is betrayed by neighs accompanied by the metallic clanking of heavy chains made of iron, silver, or gold wrapped around her neck, hands and ankles; alternatively, one might catch a glimpse of her red eyes staring out from the darkness. A guardian of graves against Grave robbers and practitioners of black magic, the creature primarily targets thieves and married men. To test the fidelity of the latter, she assumes human form and seduces them; if a man yields to temptation, she kills him. In the case of thieves, she appears in her equine form: should someone attempt to mount her and ride away, she drags them back to the graveyard to exact punishment. In some variants, the Gravekeeper engages in sexual intercourse with married men who yield to her seduction before killing them, becoming pregnant and giving birth to new Gravekeepers. These offspring are destined to guard the cemetery upon her death, or to take watch over other graveyards.

Her methods of killing vary, but most frequently involve mauling or dismembering the victim with a particular penchant for the mutilation of male genitals. Another method involves using her hooves to dig into the earth, burying her unfortunate victims alive. Anyone who sees her or hears her cry risks falling gravely ill, losing their sanity, or dying of a heart attack.

== See also ==
- Sunday Without God – Japanese manga series
