= Nisba (onomastics) =

Element in Arabic names

In Arabic names, a nisba (Arabic: نِسْبَة nisba, “attribution”), also rendered as nesba, nesbah, or nesbat, is an adjective surname indicating the person's place of origin, ancestral tribe, or ancestry, used at the end of the surname. Examples of this suffix included at the end of a surname include: -at (eg: Obeidat), -i (eg: Al Masri), -awi (eg: Badawi), -iyy for masculine and -iyyah for feminine.

Nisba, originally an Arabic word, has been passed to many other languages spoken in the Muslim world such as Turkish, Persian, Bengali, Hindi, Urdu, and Malay.

In Persian and Turkish, it is always pronounced and written as nisbat. In Arabic usage, that pronunciation occurs when the word is uttered in its construct state only.

== Original use ==
A nisba "relation" is a grammatical term referring to the suffixation of masculine -iyy, feminine -iyyah to a word to make it an adjective. As an example, the word ‘Arabiyy (عربي) means "Arab, related to Arabic, Arabian". Nisba forms are very common in Arabic names.

== Use in onomastics ==
Traditional Arabic names are patronymics (nasab), where the full name of the person is followed by the name of his father, usually linked by ibn or bin ('son'). Patronymics may be long as they may include all known forefathers. When a name is simplified to one or two ancestors, it may become confusing to distinguish from other similar names; in such cases, the nisba may be added as an additional specifier.

A nisba is usually prefixed by the definite article 'al-' and can take a number of forms:

=== Places ===
- Al-Afghani, related to or from Afghanistan
- Al-Albani, related to or from Albania e.g. Muhammad Nasiruddin al-Albani.
- Al-Almani, related to or from Germany
- Al-Amriki, related to or from America
- Al-Andalusi, related to or from the region of Al-Andalus (modern day Iberia) e.g. Said al-Andalusi, Abū ʿAbdallāh Yaʿīsh ibn Ibrāhīm ibn Yūsuf ibn Simāk al-Andalusī al-Umawī
- Al-Armani, related to or from Greater Armenia or Armenians
- al-Astarabadi, from Astarabad (modern Gorgan), Persia
- al-Asyi from Aceh in north of Sumatra, modern day Indonesia
- al-Baghdadi, related to or from the city of Baghdad, e.g. Al-Khatib al-Baghdadi, Junayd al-Baghdadi.
- al-Bakkani, from the Royal Town of Pekan in the state of Pahang in Malaysia, Mohammad Faeez Harith al-Bakkani
- al-Bangali, from the region of Bengal or a Bengali descent (mainly from Bangladesh)
- al-Bantani, from the province of Banten in Indonesia e.g. Syeikh Abdur Rauf al-Bantani
- al-Basri, from Basra, e.g. Ibn Sa'd
- al-Batawi, from Batavia (present-day Jakarta, Indonesia)
- al-Britani, related to or from the United Kingdom
- al-Bughuri, from Bogor, Indonesia
- al-Bukhari, from Bukhara, Uzbekistan
- al-Busnawi, related to or from Bosnia, e.g. Matrakçı Nasuh al-Busnawi.
- al-Buthuni, from the island of Buton in Indonesia, e.g. Haji Abdul Ghaniu al-Buthuni
- al-Daylami, from Daylam, northern Iran
- al-Dahlawi, from Delhi, India
- al-Dimashqi, related to or from the city of Damascus, e.g. Al-Dimashqi (geographer), Abu al-Fadl Ja'far ibn 'Ali al-Dimashqi
- al-Falimbani, from Palembang, present day capital city of modern South Sumatera province in Indonesia, e.g. Abdul Samad Al-Falimbani
- al-Fansuri, from the town of Pancur in the modern day Central Tapanuli Regency in North Sumatera present-day Indonesia e.g. Hamzah al-Fansuri
- al-Farsi, related to or from the region of Pars (Fars) or the country of Persia; e.g. Salman al-Farsi, Saud Al-Farsi
- al-Fatani, from the province of Pattani in Thailand e.g. Syeikh Daud al-Fatani
- al-Filisṭīnī, related to or from the region of Palestine, e.g. Abu Qatada al-Filistini
- al-Ghari, Literally means cave in Arabic. From the district of Gua Musang (literally meaning Fox Cave in Malay) in the state of Kelantan in Malaysia, e.g. Zamihan al-Ghari
- al-Hadrami, related to or from the region of Hadhramaut, e.g. Al-Ala al-Hadhrami, Ahmed Al-Hadrami, Imam al-Hadrami
- al-Hamadani, from Hamadan, Persia
- al-Hijazi, related to or from the region of Hijaz e.g. Amal Hijazi, Farouk Hijazi, Abu'l Abbas al-Hijazi
- al-Himsi, related to or from the city of Homs e.g. Qustaki al-Himsi, Ibn Na'ima al-Himsi.
- al-Harari, related to or from the city of Harar
- al-Iraqi, related to or from the country of Iraq e.g. Fakhr-al-Din Iraqi, Abdul Hadi al Iraqi, Abu Ayoub al-Iraqi
- al-Isfahani, from Isfahan, Iran
- al-Jawi, from Java or the Malay Archipelago as a whole (see also naming of Jawi script).
- al-Jaza'iri, related to or from the country of Algeria, e.g. Emir Abdelkader al-Jaza'iri, Abu Bakr al-Jaza'iri
- al-Jannabi, from Jannaba port city, Arrajan province of Iran
- al-Johori, from the state of Johor in Malaysia, e.g. Ahmad bin Ya'kob al-Johori
- al-Jurjani, from Gorgan, Iran
- al-Juzjani, from Guzgan, Iran
- al-Kadahi, from the state of Kedah in Malaysia, e.g. Syeikh Mahmud al-Kadahi
- al-Kairouani, related to or from the city of Kairouan in Tunisia.
- al-Kalantani, from the state of Kelantan in Malaysia, e.g. Ismail bin Abdul Majid al-Kalantani, Wan Ali bin Abdul Rahman al-Kalantani
- al-Karinsyi, from Kerinci
- al-Khwarizmi, related to or from the region of Khwarazm, e.g. Muhammad ibn Musa al-Khwarizmi
- al-Kohistani, from Kohistan, Pakistan
- al-Kuwaiti, related to or from the country of Kuwait, e.g. Abu Omar al-Kuwaiti, Abu Ahmed al-Kuwaiti, Jandal al-Kuwaiti
- al-Lahori, related to or from the city of Lahore, in Punjab, Pakistan, e.g. Ahmad al-Lahori
- al-Lubnani, related to or from the country of Lebanon, e.g. Bilal al-Berjawi al-Lubnani
- al-Lusunji, from Losong, in Kuala Terengganu, Malaysia, e.g. Afif al-Lusunji
- al-Maghrebi, related to or from the region of Maghreb, e.g. Ibn Yaḥyā al-Maghribī al-Samawʾal, Mahmud Sulayman al-Maghribi, Yusuf al-Maghribi.
- al-Makassari, from the city of Makassar in Indonesia, e.g. Muhammad Yusuf al-Makassari
- al-Masri, related to or from Egypt, e.g. Taher al-Masri, Abu Hamza al-Masri
- al-Mindanawi, from Mindanao e.g. Jafar Sadik Syah al-Mindanawi
- al-Nahawandi, from Nahavand, Iran
- al-Najdi, related to or from the region of Najd in Saudi Arabia, e.g. Qutaybah al-Najdi
- al-Nisaburi, al-Naysaburi, from Nishapur, Iran
- al-Qazwini, from Qazvin, Iran
- al-Quhistani, from Quhistan, Iran
- al-Qumisi, from Qumis, Iran
- al-Razi, from Ray, Iran
- al-Rûmi, from Rome
- al-Shami, related to or from the region of Levant or from the country of Syria, e.g. Nasser al-Shami, Husayn al-Shami, Abu Anas al-Shami, Abu Humam al-Shami
- al-Shinqiti, related to or from the city of Chinguetti or Bilād Šinqīṭ (Bilad Chinguetti, modern-day Mauritania), e.g. Ahmad ibn al-Amin al-Shinqiti
- al-Shirazi, from Shiraz, Iran
- al-Sindhi, related to or from the region of Sindh, e.g. Mohammad Hayyat al-Sindhi
- al-Singkili, from the town of Singkil in the province of Aceh in Indonesia, e.g. Abd al-Rauf ibn Ali al-Fansuri al-Singkili
- al-Sistani, al-Sijistani, al-Sajistani, al-Sijzi, from Sistan, Iran or Greater Iran
- al-Tabari, from Tabaristan, Iran
- al-Tantawi, from Tanta, Egypt, e.g. Nasrudin Hasan Tantawi
- al-Tiflisi, from Tiflis (Tbilisi), Georgia
- al-Tihami, related to or from the region of Tihamah in Saudi Arabia
- al-Tikriti, related to or from the city of Tikrit, e.g. Saddam Hussein Abd al-Majid al-Tikriti, Abu Raita al-Takriti, Barzan Ibrahim al-Tikriti
- al-Tunisi, related to or from the country of Tunisia, e.g. Abu Nasr al-Tunisi, Abu Osama al-Tunisi, Ali ibn Ziyad at-Tarabulsi al-Tunisi al-'Absi, Nabilah al-Tunisi
- al-Turki, related to or from the country of Turkey, e.g. Abu Yusuf Al-Turki, Azjur al-Turki, Hassan Abdullah Hersi al-Turki, Hussain Al-Turki
- al-Tusi, from Tus, Iran
- al-Yemeni, related to or from the country of Yemen
- al-Yrifani, related to or from Yerevan
- al-Zayla'i, related to or from Zeila region and Zeila town in Horn of Africa, e.g. Abd Al-Rahman al-Zayla'i
- ar-Raniri, from the town of Rander, in Surat district in the state of Gujarat, India, e.g. Nuruddin ar-Raniri
- as-Sambasi, from the regency of Sambas in Indonesia, e.g. Muhammad Jabir as-Sambasi
- as-Sarawaki, from the state of Sarawak in Malaysia, e.g. Muhtar Suhaili As-Sarawaki
- as-Sumatrani, from the island of Sumatra in Indonesia, e.g. Syeikh Syamsuddin as-Sumatrani
- as-Sumbawi, from the island of Sumbawa in Indonesia, e.g. Syeikh Muhammad Zainuddin as-Sumbawi
- at-Tranjanuwi, from the state of Terengganu in Malaysia, e.g. Iskandar at-Tranjanuwi
- al-Darbandi, Darbandi, from Derbent, Persia
- El Djezairi, related to or from Algeria e.g. Abdelkader El Djezairi.
- Faridi, related to or from the region of Greater Faridpur in Bangladesh e.g. Abdul Haque Faridi
- al-Khurasani, from Khurasan, e.g. Abu Muslim, Abdallah ibn Tahir al-Khurasani
- Islamabadi, related to or from the city of Chittagong (previously known as Islamabad) e.g. Maniruzzaman Islamabadi
- al-Maneri, from Maner Sharif, India, e.g. Makhdoom Yahya Maneri
- al-Marwazi, from Marw, Khurasan
- al-Rûmi, from Rûm (The Balkans and Asia Minor)
- Siraji, related to or from the district of Sirajganj in Bangladesh e.g. Ismail Hossain Siraji

=== Tribes, clans or families ===
- al-Tamimi, from the tribe or clan of Bani Tamim. e.g. Modher Sadeq-Saba al-Tamimi, Talib al-Suhail al-Tamimi, Alaa al-Tamimi.
- al-Qurashi, from the tribe or clan of Quraish. e.g. ibn Kathir al-Qurashi, Abû 'Uthmân Sa'îd ibn Hakam al Qurashi.
- Al-Hashemi, from the clan of Banu Hashim. Members of the Hashemite dynasty are referred to with the nisba "Al-Hashemi".
- at-Ta'i, from the tribe of Tai'. e.g. Hatem at-Ta'i.
- al-Ishaaqi, from the tribe or clan of Ishaaq in Somaliland
- al-Banjari, from the people of Banjar ethnicity in Indonesia e.g. Muhammad Arsyad bin Abdullah al-Banjari
- al-Minankabawi - from the people of Minangkabau ethnicity in Indonesia e.g. Syeikh Ahmad Khatib al-Minankabawi, Syeikh Ismail Khalidi al-Minankabawi
- al-Mandaili - from the people of Mandailing ethnicity in Indonesia e.g. Haji Abdur Rahman al-Mandaili
- al-Rawi - from the people of Rawa ethnicity in Indonesia e.g. Tengku Limbang Laut al-Rawi

=== People ===
- al-Maliki, related to Malik al-Ashtar. e.g. Nouri al-Maliki
- al-Faruqi, related to Faruq the Great. e.g. Ismail al-Faruqi

=== Faith ===
- al-Nasiri, with nasiri meaning "Christian", more literally: "Nazarene"
- al-Majusi, with majus meaning "Zoroastrian"

=== Occupations ===
- al-Falaki, with falak meaning "astronomy" e.g. Syeikh Tahir Jalaluddin al-Falaki

=== Multiples ===
One can have more than one nisba, one can be related to a city, a clan, a profession and a person at the same time. Examples include:

- Ali ibn Abi Hazm al-Qarshi al-Dimashqi, from the tribe of Quraish and from Damascus (Dimashq).
- Abd al-Qahir ibn Tahir al-Tamimi al-Shafi`i al-Baghdadi, from the tribe of Bani Tamim, from the city of Baghdad and a follower of Muhammad ibn Idris ash-Shafi`i.
- Makhdoom Yahya Maneri al-Suharwardi al-Hashimi al-Muttalabi, from the town of Maner Sharif, of the Sufi order Suhrawardiyya, of the tribe Banu Hashim and clan of Abd al-Muttalib.

The nisba is optional but is quite widespread.

== Examples ==
- Ansari — from Ansar, the people of Medina who helped Muhammad
- Hanbali — someone following Ahmad ibn Hanbal's school of Islamic jurisprudence
- Isma'ili — those who accepted Isma'il ibn Ja'far as the rightful Imam
- Zayla'i — someone from the historical port town of Zeila

== See also ==
- Arabic name
- Kunya (Arabic)
- Patrial name – Variety of surname
- Ó and Mac
- Takhallus - a nom de plume conventionally adopted by Islamic poets
