= Al-Tunisi =

al-Tunisi (Arabic for "the Tunisian"), in Northern Africa usually spelled el-Tunsi, is an Arabic surname. Notable people with this name include:

- Ali ibn Ziyad al-Tunisi – full name of Ali ibn Ziyad
- Fathi al-Tunisi – alternative name for Abu Sayyaf (ISIL)
- Farouk al-Tunisi – alternative name for Abderraouf Jdey, a suspect leader of al Qaeda
- Mahmud Bayram el-Tunsi Egyptian poet (1893–1961)
- Ibn Ishaq al-Tunisi – Tunisian 13th-century astronomer
- Jalaluddin al-Tunisi - IS leader.
- Khair al-Din Pasha al-Tunisi – alternate name for Hayreddin Pasha, an Ottoman governor of Tunisia
- Nabilah al-Tunisi – Saudi engineer and businesswoman.
- Abu Nasr al-Tunisi – wanted by the FBI since 2002
- Abu Osama al-Tunisi (died 2007) – suspected leader of al Qaeda in Iraq.
- Abu Osama al-Tunisi (died 2016) – ISIS militant and "emir" of Manbij, Syria, killed on 9 June 2016.
- Abu Ubaydh al-Tunisi – suspected leader of al Qaeda
- Abu Yusif al-Tunisi – alternate name for Faker Boussora, a Canadian of Tunisian descent who faces a $5 million bounty
