= Zawba'ah =

Green Devil in Medieval Islam

The image represents one of the 7 Jinn kings, the king of Friday

Zawba'ah is the ruler of the jinn associated with Friday, the planet Venus, the color green, and the metal iron. Under the supervision of the angel Anya'il (Haniel), he shares a connection to the wind with ancient Mesopotamian demons. He is one of the oldest among the jinn kings second in seniority only to Shamharush and for this reason, he rarely wages war anymore.

== Attributes ==
Anatomically similar to the Div (monstrous creatures of ancient mythology with a human body and animal head), Zawba'ah possesses a deeply devout nature: he was one of the nine jinn who listened to the Prophet Muhammad recite the Quran, and is known for his habit of eavesdropping on the angels' conversations regarding fate. When he smiles, his face lights up, emanating an intense light between his teeth. In esoteric and talismanic practices, he is often invoked to send lesser spirits capable of arousing feelings of love or lust.

== Representation ==
In the illustrations of the Kitab Al-Bulhan (Book of Wonders), Zawba‘ah displays a decidedly singular posture and anatomy:

He is depicted as a four headed demon named Mazer, Tikal, Kummum and Qaswara, whose heads blend the features of various animal species. Two heads are turned in profile and two face forward, creating a combination of hideous horned heads (the upper one featuring two inward-curving bovine horns) and more docile equine heads. Also known as "Zawba‘ah the White" due to his lineage among the white jinn, he is said to wear brilliant white robes and a crown topped with a large circle. He sits cross-legged in a regal pose, supported by a group of ministers and adorned with broad armbands. The entire depiction is surmounted by two talismans used for his ritual invocation.

== See Also ==
- Al-Madhab
- Al-Abyad
- Al-Ahmar
- Barqan
- Shamharush
- Maymun
