= Shamharush =

Purple Devil in Medieval Islam

The image represents one of the 7 Jinn kings, the king of Thursday

Shamharush also known as Shamhurish or Sidi Chamharouch and is nicknamed al-Tayyar translated as the flying one, is the king of the jinn associated with Thursday, the planet Jupiter, the color purple, and the metal tin. He operates under the supervision of the angel Sarfya'il. One of the oldest rulers of his kind, he bears the title Nasrani (Christian), a reference to the era prior to his conversion to Islam following a meeting with the Prophet Muhammad, after which he was recognized as the Great Qadi (The Great Judge) and an expert in Islamic law. He is considered the oldest, wisest, and most influential of the seven jinn kings.

== Veneration ==
This is the sanctuary of Shamharush present in a village in Morocco on Mount Toubkal

He is venerated as a guardian figure akin to a saint by many traditional officials and pashas. At the foot of the High Atlas, near the village of Aroumd in Morocco, stands an ancient shrine dedicated to him: a subterranean structure beneath a massive, whitewashed boulder topped with green and white flags, flanked by a mosque. The site is considered the supreme judicial seat for resolving conflicts between humans and jinn disputes heralded by thunder, lightning, and the appearance of shadows even though the shrine has been abandoned for decades. Some sources refer to Mount Toubkal, the highest peak in the Atlas range as Mount Shamharush, because, according to Arab and Islamic legends, he dwelt upon its summit.

== Degradation of the figure ==
From the 16th century onwards, the figure of Shamharush underwent a progressive and drastic diminution in stature. Rumors began to circulate portraying him as the father of succubi; these beliefs were powerfully amplified by one of the most famous Arab legends concerning the Jinn, that of Aicha Kandisha. According to one of the most popular versions, this fearsome female entity was born to a Moroccan noblewoman who had been raped by Shamharush; having initially lived as an ordinary human, Kandisha returned to life after her death as a succubus-jinn, known for seducing men only to kill them.

This demonization was likely promoted and propagated by Moroccan Islamic scholars and theologians (ulama). Indeed, the worship and veneration accorded to a jinn as if he were a saint (wali) constituted a serious doctrinal deviation and an act of idolatry (shirk). This widespread campaign of delegitimization caused Shamharush to lose much of his spiritual prominence, both in the wider Arab world and across much of Morocco itself. His veneration survived almost exclusively in a few isolated mountain communities in Morocco, sheltered from the pressures of religious orthodoxy.

== Attributes ==
Shamhurash presides over the realms of law, justice, abundance, and childhood. He is typically associated with all the elements and especially with the "wind" as a symbol of wisdom and he is an impartial judge, he instructs other rulers in the art of governance. He presides over the supreme tribunal of the jinn, whose proceedings are attended by all the kings and even Iblis. Despite his immense authority, he is known for his merciful nature, which leads him to grant humans the opportunity to redeem themselves. Shamhurash loves to travel constantly through the human world and observe its inhabitants; it was during one of these journeys that he met the Prophet Muhammad.

== Representation ==
In the miniatures of the Kitab al-Bulhan (Book of Wonders) and within the esoteric tradition, his figure embodies complex mystical meanings:

Known by the epithet Abu al-Walid (Father of the Newborn), he is depicted holding a naked infant upside down, signifying his dual and enigmatic influence over earliest childhood. The illustration associated with him features intricate sigils and the hexagon known as Khatam Sulayman (Seal of Solomon), whose two interlocking triangles represent the union of the celestial and terrestrial worlds.

== See Also ==
- Al-Madhab
- Al-Abyad
- Al-Ahmar
- Barqan
- Zawba'ah
- Maymun
