= Sidi Ali Ben Ziyad Mosque =

Former mosque in Tunis, Tunisia

- مسجد سيدي علي بن زياد

Religion
- Affiliation: Islam
- Branch/tradition: Sunni

Location
- Location: Tunis, Tunisia

Architecture
- Type: Mosque

Sidi Ali Ben Ziyad Mosque (Arabic: مسجد سيدي علي بن زياد), was a Tunisian mosque located in the west of the medina of Tunis. It does not exist anymore.

== Localization ==
The mosque was located in Sidi Ali Ben Ziyad Street, behind Dar El Bey.

== Etymology ==
It got its name from a saint, Sidi Ali ibn Ziyad, a jurisconsult from Ifriqiya and a Malikite Imam.

== History ==
According to the historian Mohamed Belkhodja, Sidi Ali ibn Ziyad died in 799 and was buried in this mosque, which means it existed in the 9th century.
