= Gorgan (disambiguation) =

Gorgan (Persian: گرگان) is a city in Golestan Province, Iran.

Gorgan may also refer to:

== Iran ==
- Gorgan, Kermanshah, village in Kermanshah Province, Iran
- Gorgan, Markazi, village in Markazi Province, Iran
- other name for German, Iran, village in Kharqan Rural District, Bastam District, Shahrud County, Semnan Province, Iran
- Gorgan-e Bitaraf, another village in Kharqan Rural District, Bastam District, Shahrud County, Semnan Province, Iran
- Gorgan County, in Golestan Province, Iran
- Gorganrud River, a river in northeastern Iran
- Great Wall of Gorgan, ancient defensive fortifications located near the above-named Gorgan in Golestan Province

== Romania ==
- Gorgan, a village in the commune Cenade, Alba County, Romania
- Gorgan (river), a tributary of the Cozd in Brașov County, Romania

== See also ==
- Astarabad (disambiguation), former name of Gorgan city in Iran and related terms
- Gorgani (disambiguation)
- Gürgan, village in Baku, Azerbaijan
- Hyrcania (disambiguation)
