= Maymun =

Black Devil in Medieval Islam

The image represents one of the 7 Jinn kings, the king of Saturday

Maymun Abanuch (also known as Maymun al-Shahabi, Abu Nuh, or Maymon Rex) is the last of the seven kings of the Jinn, associated with Saturday, the planet Saturn, the color black, and gold. He acts under the supervision of the angel Kasfa'il, and his name means "monkey" in both Arabic and Persian (with a possible affinity to the Aramaic Mammona). Considered the leader of the wind demons, he possesses a golden palace hidden among the clouds in Babylon in Iraq.

== Attributes ==
Possessing physical strength unmatched by any other jinn and displaying ruthlessness in battle, Maymun is nonetheless described as a kind and benevolent king. He embodies an inherent and complex ambivalence:

Widely venerated as a saintly jinn and a devout Muslim (Sidi Mimun), he is nonetheless in the service of the minister Dikianos, an associate of Iblis linked to plagues, which is why his presence evokes anxiety, sadness, and melancholy.

== Variant in Morocco ==
Later, another legend emerged in Morocco concerning a Jinn inspired by Maymon: the legend of Queen Lalla Mimuna, depicted wearing a white (or white and green) gown and a gem-adorned crown with large wings and a very charming appearance. She is a miracle-worker, a protector of lovers, an exorcist, and an anticolonial figure who fought the French in Morocco by luring them into the Sahara desert.

== Representation ==
Described by the author Al-Buni as "the Winged One," "the Black One," and "the Executioner," he presents a precise visual characterization in the Book of Wonders:

He appears among oriental-style clouds as a hairy, monkey-faced jinn, complete with cow horns, goat ears, fangs, green eyes, and large, outstretched wings with gold and red feathers. The musculature of his torso and its adornments recall the Zawba'a jinn, while red flames envelop his lower body. He is depicted descending from the sky, holding the half-naked body of a sleeping man (or child) in mid-air, symbolizing his demonic power to abduct sleeping or unaware humans.

== See Also ==
- Al-Madhab
- Al-Abyad
- Al-Ahmar
- Barqan
- Shamharush
- Zawba'ah
