= Al-Madhab =

Golden Devil in Medieval Islam

The image represents one of the 7 Jinn kings, the king of Sunday

Al-Madhab (The Golden One), also known as Al-Muth-hib (The Golden King), is one of the Kings of the East and a ruler of the jinn associated with Sunday and the Sun. A descendant of the solar goddess Shams, he belongs to the Banu Danair al-Jan Jamlith, a powerful and illustrious tribe renowned for its profound wisdom and mastery of the occult arts. Dating back to the era of the Prophet-King Suleyman (the biblical Solomon). Al-Madhab Is linked to the element of fire, the metal gold, and the resin Sandarus (Arabic sandaraca), he works under the supervision of the angel Ruqiayil (Raphael). Al-Madhab was predominantly venerated in the Arabian Peninsula region.

== Attributes ==
Al-Madhab is counted among the guardians of the earth's treasures; he commands 360 tribes and rules from seven palaces synchronized with the solar cycle, moving from one to another every hour to administer his domains. Considered an absolute master of alchemy and the occult sciences, he guards the secrets of solar mechanisms and the ability to transmute matter into pure gold. His name also derives from his legendary golden-coated horse, adorned with a golden saddle and bridle engraved with the exploits of his ancestors.

== Representation ==
In classical iconography and the miniatures of the Kitab Al-Bulhan (Book of Wonders), Al-Madhab presents a complex aesthetic rich in contrasts:

He is depicted with blue or pink skin, a rounded head, long ears, and flaming eyes. His head is encircled by a halo of golden fire, while his neck and shoulders are wrapped in a cloud of gold or wool. He wears elegant silk garments, including loose-fitting orange trousers, and is associated with fine brocade. He is portrayed as an infernal spirit devouring snakes, flanked by two acolytes. His figure is accompanied by two talismans: a six-pointed star (the Seal of Solomon) and a rectangular talisman bearing his full epithet.

== See Also ==
- Al-Abyad
- Al-Ahmar
- Barqan
- Shamharush
- Zawba'ah
- Maymun
