= Barqan (Jinn) =

Blue Devil in Medieval Islam

The image represents one of the 7 Jinn kings, the king of Wednesday

Barqan (meaning Two Flashes of Lightning or Father of Wonders), also known as Al-Malik al-Aswad (The Black King), is the ruler of the jinn associated with Wednesday, the planet Mercury, the color Blue, and the metal brass. He is placed under the spiritual supervision of the angel Mikail (Michael). Although the youngest of the jinn kings, he rules over a multitude of spirits and has served as lord of the City of Carnelian and the Castle of Gold. His domain includes five hilltop fortresses, each populated by 500,000 Marid; he and his tribe are traditionally linked to the worship of Fire.

== Attributes ==
Characterized by extraordinary intelligence, martial cunning, and profound wisdom, Barqan combines immense physical strength and decisiveness with an unusually humble nature. Described as a serene ruler who wears a constant smile, he listens to anyone who addresses him, including children, and treats every jinn with deep respect. Barqan is a supreme master of magic and the occult sciences. Although he is feared for the transmission of dark arts and summoning him is discouraged, various practitioners seek his favor to gain power and spiritual blessings.

== Representation ==
In traditional miniatures, such as those found in the Kitab Al-Bulhan (Book of Wonders), Barqan presents a distinctive aesthetic accompanied by a unique retinue:

He is depicted as a powerful, black-skinned, horned demon, with vivid flames issuing from his eyes and mouth. He is shown training his followers and assistants, described by art historians as visually extraordinary figures, and revealing to them the secrets of magic to be used against humanity for malevolent ends. His figure is accompanied by an elaborate astronomical and mystical talisman associated with the influences of Mercury.

== See Also ==
- Al-Madhab
- Al-Abyad
- Al-Ahmar
- Shamharush
- Zawba'ah
- Maymun
