= Gorgani =

Gorgani (Persian: گرگانی) means "of or related to Gorgan", a city in north of Iran.

- Gorgani language

Gorgani or Gurgani is a nisba that refers to the city of Gorgan (also known as "Astarabad" and "Jurjan"), and may refer to:

- Fakhraddin Gorgani (fl. 1050), Persian poet
- Rostam Gorgani, mid-16th century Persian physician who lived in India
- Abul Qasim Gurgani, Sufi
- Mohammad Alavi Gorgani, Iranian Twelver shi'a marja

== See also ==
- Gorgan (disambiguation)
- al-Jurjani
- Astarabadi
