= Estarabad =

Estarabad (Persian: استرآباد) may refer to:

- Estarabad or Astarabad, former name of Gorgan
- Estarabad Rural District
- Estarabad-e Jonubi Rural District (South Estarabad Rural District)
- Estarabad-e Shomali Rural District (North Estarabad Rural District)
- Astrabad shad, Alosa caspia persica

== See also ==
- Astarabadi, surname
- Gorgan (disambiguation)
