= Abu Osama al-Tunisi =

Abu Osama al-Tunisi is the name of:

- Abu Osama al-Tunisi (died 2007), suspected leader of al-Qaeda in Iraq, died 2007
- Abu Osama al-Tunisi (died 2016), ISIS militant and emir of Manbij, Syria, killed in the Manbij offensive (2016)
