= Al-Ahmar (Jinn) =

Red Devil in Medieval Islam

The image represents one of the 7 Jinn kings, the king of Tuesday

Al-Malik Al-Ahmar (The Red King) is the ruler of the jinn associated with Tuesday, the planet Mars, and the martial element. He operates under the supervision of the angel Samsama'il (Samael) and is linked to metals such as copper and red mercury. Considered one of the generals and commanders in the army of Prince Morrah (son of Iblis), he is simultaneously counted among the jinn rulers who believed in God without rebelling. He also holds the role of ruler of the Qareen, the spirits and spiritual companions assigned to every human being. Al-Ahmar is also considered the tribal leader of the Ifrit, the demons of fire.

== Attributes ==
Resembling the composite figure of Ares and Mars from the Greco-Roman pantheon, Al-Ahmar is a jinn of a stern, irascible temperament, rarely given to smiling. Endowed with extraordinary strength and legendary invincibility in war, he commands armies, ministers, and a vast retinue, employing sophisticated martial stratagems and a ruthless bloodlust. Blindness and Wrath: The Sabians of Harran associated him with the martial spirit Mara-Samya (Blind Lord), an epithet shared with the angel of the sphere of Mars (Samael). The attribute of blindness stems from his blind, indiscriminate violence on the battlefield.

== Representation ==
In historical illustrations, such as those found in the Kitab Al-Bulhan (Book of Wonders), Al-Ahmar is depicted with distinct visual and talismanic characteristics:

He is portrayed as a monstrous figure astride a lion, armed with a sword and holding a severed head. The Arabic miniatures depicting him feature elements from the mystical-Kabbalistic tradition, including "spectacle-like symbols," numbers, and the ritual repetition of the Arabic letter "ṭā’" (ṭ).

== See Also ==
- Al-Madhab
- Al-Abyad
- Barqan
- Shamharush
- Zawba'ah
- Maymun
