= Al-Yemeni =

al-Yemeni (Arabic: اليمني) is a nisba meaning relation to Yemen. It may refer to:

- Abu Bara al Yemeni, a citizen of Yemen who was slated to participate in al-Qaeda's attacks on the United States on September 11, 2001
- Haitham al-Yemeni, al-Qaeda explosives expert from Yemen
- Hussein al-Yemeni, suspected al-Qaeda terrorist group member
