= Abu Ma'shar al-Balkhi =

Persian astrologer and philosopher (787–886)

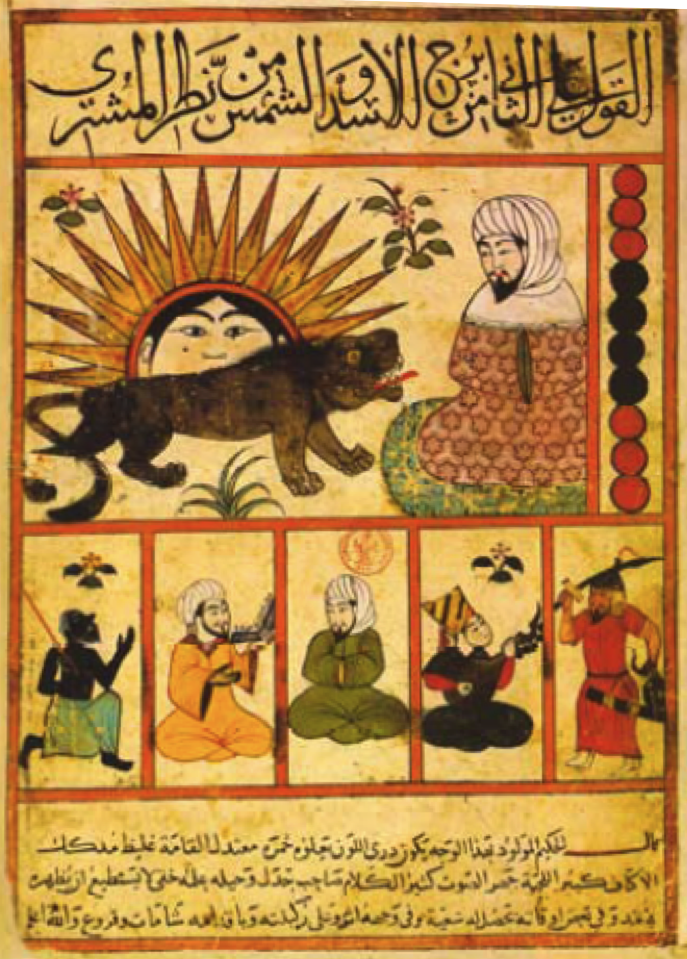
- Page of a 14th-century manuscript of the "Book of nativities", Cairo, Egypt (BNF Arabe 2583 fol. 15v). Painted by Persian artist Qanbar' Ali al-Shirazi.
- Born: 10 August 787; Balkh, Khurasan
- Died: 9 March 886 (aged 98); Wāsiṭ, Iraq, Abbasid Caliphate

Academic background
- Influences: Aristotle and Ptolemy

Academic work
- Era: Islamic Golden Age (Abbasid era)
- Main interests: Astrology, Astronomy
- Influenced: Al-Sijzi, Albertus Magnus, Roger Bacon, Pierre d'Ailly, Pico della Mirandola.

Abu Ma‘shar al-Balkhi, Latinized as Albumasar (also Albusar, Albuxar, Albumazar; full name Abū Maʿshar Jaʿfar ibn Muḥammad ibn ʿUmar al-Balkhī ابومَعْشَر جعفر بن محمد بن عمر بلخی; 10 August 787 – 9 March 886, AH 171–272), was an early Persian Muslim astrologer, thought to be the greatest astrologer of the Abbasid court in Baghdad. While he was not a major innovator, his practical manuals for training astrologers profoundly influenced Muslim intellectual history and, through translations, that of western Europe and Byzantium.

== Life ==
Abū Maʿshar was a native of Balkh, a town in the Balkh province of Afghanistan, approximately 74 kilometres (46 mi) south of the Amu Darya, one of the main bases of support of the Abbasid revolt in the early 8th century. Its population, as was generally the case in the frontier areas of the Arab conquest of Persia, remained culturally dedicated to its Sasanian and Hellenistic heritage. He probably came to Baghdad in the early years of the caliphate of al-Maʾmūn (r. 813–833). According to al-Nadim's Al-Fihrist (10th century), he lived on the west side of Baghdad, near Bab Khurasan, the northeast gate of the original city on the west bank of the Tigris.

Abū Maʿshar was a member of the third generation (after the Arab Conquest) of the Pahlavi-oriented Khurasani intellectual elite, and he defended an approach of a “most astonishing and inconsistent” eclecticism. His reputation saved him from religious persecution, although there is a report of one incident where he was whipped for his practice of astrology under the caliphate of al-Musta'in (r. 862–866). He was a scholar of hadith, and according to biographical tradition, he only turned to astrology at the age of forty-seven (832/3). He became involved in a bitter dispute with al-Kindi (c. 796–873), the foremost Arab philosopher of his time, who was versed in Aristotelism and Neoplatonism. It was his confrontation with al-Kindi that convinced Abū Maʿshar of the need to study “mathematics” in order to understand philosophical arguments.

His foretelling of an event that subsequently occurred earned him a lashing ordered by the displeased Caliph al-Musta'in. "I hit the mark and I was severely punished."

Al-Nadim includes an extract from Abū Maʿshar's book on the variations of astronomical tables, which describes how the Persian kings gathered the best writing materials in the world to preserve their books on the sciences and deposited them in the Sarwayh fortress in the city of Jayy in Isfahan. The depository continued to exist at the time al-Nadim wrote in the 10th century.

Amir Khusrav mentions that Abū Maʿshar came to Benaras (Varanasi) and studied astronomy there for ten years.

Abū Maʿshar is said to have died at the age of 98 (but a centenarian according to the Islamic year count) in Wāsiṭ in eastern Iraq, during the last two nights of Ramadan of AH 272 (9 March 866). Abū Maʿshar was a Persian nationalist, studying Sasanian-era astrology in his "Kitab al-Qeranat" to predict the imminent collapse of Arab rule and the restoration of Persian rule.

== Works ==
=== Science of astrology ===
His work Kitāb al-madkhal al-kabīr (English: The Great Introduction to the Science of Astrology) provides an introduction to astrology which received many translations to Latin and Greek starting from the 11th century.

In one part of this book he records the rising of tides in relation with the position of the Moon, noticing that there are two high-tides in a day. He rejected Greek thought that moonlight influenced the tides and considered that the Moon had some astrological virtue that attracted the sea. These ideas were discussed by European medieval scholars. It had significant influence on European medieval scholars, like Albert the Great who developed his own theory of tides based on a mix of both light and Abū Ma'shar virtue.

=== Other work ===
His works on astronomy are not extant, but information can still be gleaned from summaries found in the works of later astronomers or from his astrology works.

- Kitāb mukhtaṣar al-madkhal, an abridged version of the above, later translated to Latin by Adelard of Bath.
- Kitāb al-milal wa-ʾl-duwal ("Book on religions and dynasties"), probably his most important work, commented on in the major works of Roger Bacon, Pierre d'Ailly, and Pico della Mirandola.
- Fī dhikr ma tadullu ʿalayhi al-ashkhāṣ al-ʿulwiyya ("On the indications of the celestial objects"),
- Kitāb al-dalālāt ʿalā al-ittiṣālāt wa-qirānāt al-kawākib ("Book of the indications of the planetary conjunctions"),
- Kitāb al-ulūf ("Book of thousands"), preserved only in summaries by Sijzī.
- Kitāb taḥāwīl sinī al-ʿālam (Flowers of Abu Ma'shar), uses horoscopes to examine months and days of the year. It was a manual for astrologers. It was translated in the 12th century by John of Seville.
- Kitāb taḥāwil sinī al-mawālīd ("Book of the revolutions of the years of nativities"). translated into Greek in 1000, and from that translation into Latin in the 13th century.
- Kitāb mawālīd al-rijāl wa-ʾl-nisāʾ ("Book of nativities of men and women"), which was widely circulated in the Islamic world. ʻAbd al-Ḥasan Iṣfāhānī copied excerpts into the 14th century illustrated manuscript the Kitab al-Bulhan (ca.1390). (Note: In 1390 ʻAbd al-Ḥasan Iṣfāhānī compiled a miscellany of treatises called the Kitab al-Bulhan (كتاب البلهان), and in his introduction he mentions the astrological treatise on the horoscopes of men and women from the Kitab al-mawalid of Abu Ma'shar which is included in his book. This compilation was probably bound in Baghdad during the reign of Jalayirid Sultan Ahmad (1382–1410).)

=== Latin and Greek translations ===
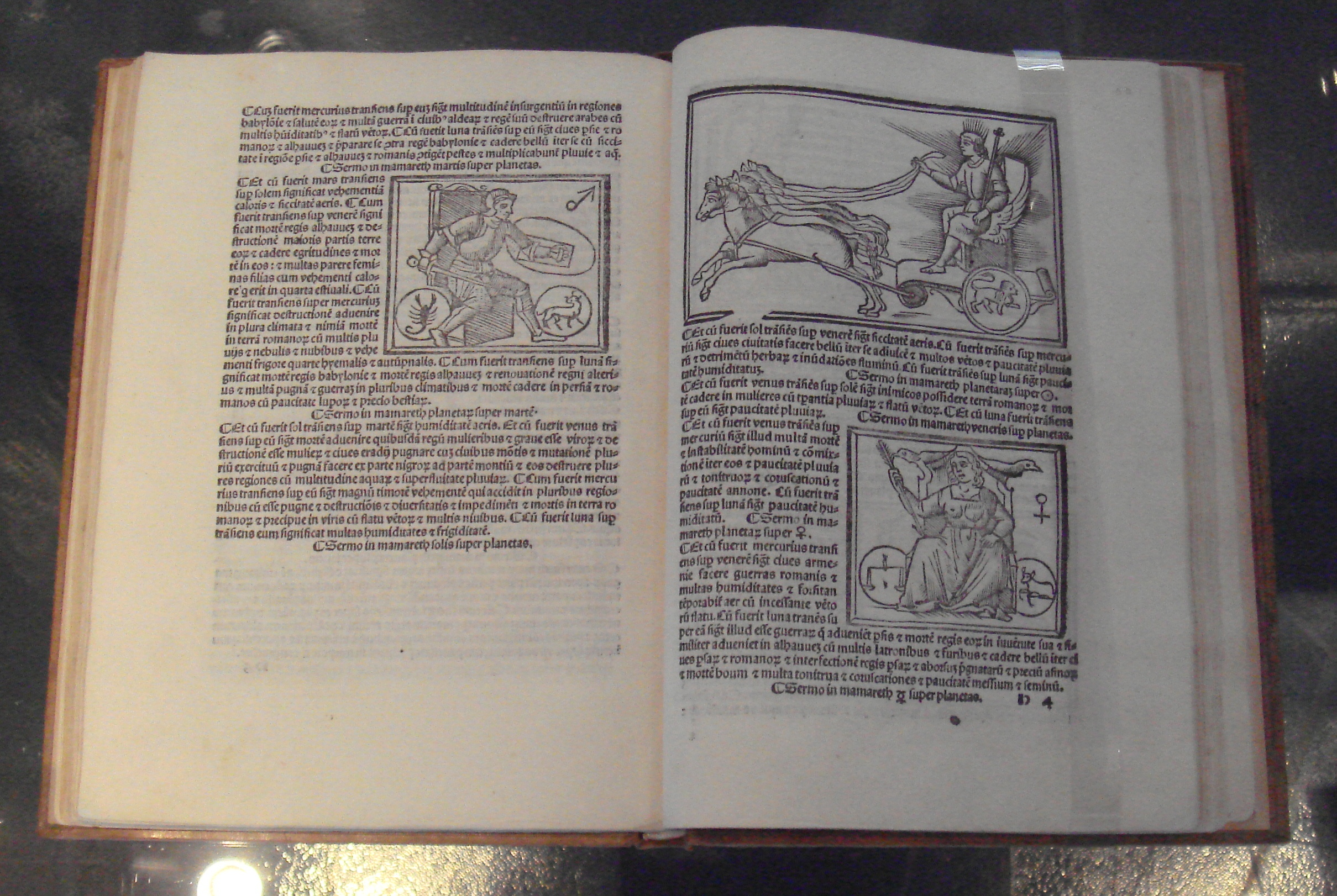
Page spread from the 1515 Venetian edition of Abu Ma'shar's De Magnis Coniunctionibus

Albumasar's "Introduction" (Kitāb al-mudkhal al-kabīr, written c. 848) was first translated into Latin by John of Seville in 1133, as Introductorium in Astronomiam, and again, less literally and abridged, as De magnis coniunctionibus, by Herman of Carinthia in 1140. Lemay (1962) argued that the writings of Albumasar were very likely the single most important original source for the recovery of Aristotle for medieval European scholars prior to the middle of the 12th century.

Herman of Carinthia's translation, De magnis coniunctionibus, was first printed by Erhard Ratdolt of Augsburg in 1488/9. It was again printed in Venice, in 1506 and 1515.

Modern editions:

- De magnis coniunctionibus, ed. K. Yamamoto, Ch. Burnett, Leiden, 2000, 2 vols. (Arabic & Latin text).
- De revolutionibus nativitatum, ed. D. Pingree, Leipzig, 1968 (Greek text).
- Liber florum ed. James Herschel Holden in Five Medieval Astrologers (Tempe, Az.: A.F.A., Inc., 2008): 13–66.
- Introductorium maius, ed. R. Lemay, Napoli, 1995–1996, 9 vols. (Arabic text & two Latin translations).
- Ysagoga minor, ed. Ch. Burnett, K. Yamamoto, M. Yano, Leiden-New York, 1994 (Arabic & Latin text).
- The Great Introduction to Astrology, The Arabic Original and English Translation. Edited and translated by Keiji Yamamoto, Charles Burnett, Leiden-Boston, Brill, 2019. ISBN 978-90-04-38123-0https://youtu.be/uX_jcHISOCE?si=1ZMKjTy2Yu5sZ5C5

== See also ==
- Islamic astrology
- List of Iranian scientists

== Bibliography ==
- Pingree, David (1970). "Abū Ma'shar al-Balkhī, Ja'far ibn Muḥammad". Dictionary of Scientific Biography. Vol. 1. New York: Charles Scribner's Sons. pp. 32–39. ISBN 0-684-10114-9.
- Yamamoto, Keiji (2007). "Abū Maʿshar Jaʿfar ibn Muḥammad ibn ʿUmar al-Balkhi". In Thomas Hockey; et al. (eds.). The Biographical Encyclopedia of Astronomers. New York: Springer. p. 11. ISBN 978-0-387-31022-0. (PDF version)
- Blažeković, Zdravko (1997). Music Symbolism in Medieval and Renaissance Astrological Imagery. PhD diss., City University of New York, The Graduate Center.
- Carboni, Stefano, The 'Book of Surprises' (Kitab al-bulhan)of the Bodleian Library (PDF), p. 3
- Isfahani (al-) (1931) [1390]. Kitab al-Bulhan, MS. Bodl. Or. 133, fol. 34r. Bodleian Library: University of Oxford.
