= Marwazi =

Marwazi (Persian: مروزی) or al-Marwazi (Arabic: المروزي) is a nisba meaning "from Merv", a historical city in (early Khorasan and present day Central Asia), near today's Mary in Turkmenistan. It may refer to:

- ʿĪsā al-Marwazī (fl. 9th century), Syriac lexicographer
- Habash al-Hasib al-Marwazi (died after 869), Persian astronomer, geographer, and mathematician who described trigonometric ratios
- Ibn Qutaybah or Abū Muhammad Abd-Allāh ibn Muslim ibn Qutayba al-Dīnawarī al-Marwazī (828–885), Islamic scholar
- Abu'l-Abbas Marwazi, 9th-century Persian poet
- 'Abdallah ibn Muhammad ibn Yazdad al-Marwazi (died 875), senior Persian official of the Abbasid Caliphate in the mid-9th century
- Yusuf ibn Muhammad ibn Yusuf al-Marwazi, 9th-century governor of Adharbayjan and Arminiyah for the Abbasid Caliphate
- Hakim al-Shahid, Hanafi jurist
- Kisai Marvazi, 10th-century Persian poet
- Shams al-Dīn al-Marwazī, (Turkmen: Shemseddin Mervezi, 1077 – c. 1139), medieval astronomer
- Abu Tahir Marwazi, 12th-century prominent Persian philosopher from Khwarezmia
- Sharaf al-Zaman al-Marwazi, 11th–12th-century physician and author of Nature of Animals
