= Hyrcanus =

Hyrcanus may refer to

- John Hyrcanus, Jewish High Priest, 134–104 BCE
- Hyrcanus II, King of Judea, 67–66 BCE
- Eliezer ben Hurcanus or Hyrcanus, prominent sage in Judea in the 1st and 2nd centuries CE
- Hyrcanus, the son of Tobias, one of the Jewish Tobiads of the 2nd century BCE

== See also ==
- Hyrcania (disambiguation)
