= Hyrcania (disambiguation) =

Hyrcania or Hyrkania may refer to:

Geography

- Hyrcania, a historical region south-east of the Caspian Sea in modern-day Iran
  - Hyrcanian civilization
  - Hyrcanian Ocean, the Caspian Sea
  - Hyrcanian forests, a large forest zone on the southern coast of the Caspian Sea in Iran and Azerbaijan
- Hyrcania (fortress), ruined Judaean fortress in the West Bank
- Hyrcania (Lydia), a town of ancient Lydia

Fictional geography

- Hyrkania (Conan), a fictional location in Robert E. Howard's Conan mythos
- Hyrkania, a fictional location in Marvel Comics’ Red Sonja mythos

== See also ==
- Gorgan (disambiguation)
- Hercynia (disambiguation)
- Hyrcanus (disambiguation)
