= Hercynia (disambiguation) =

Hercynia is a name for the ancient Hercynian Forest.

Hercynia or Hercynian may also refer to:

- 458 Hercynia, an asteroid
- Hercynian orogeny, a synonym for the Variscan orogeny of the Carboniferous
- Hercynian massifs, part of the Massif Central of France
- Hercynia (journal), a journal published by the Universities and Landesbibliothek of Sachsen-Anhalt, which covers ecology and environmental biology
- Hercynia, a junior synonym of the ant genus Wasmannia
- Hercuniates, a tribe of ancient Hercynia

== See also ==
- Hyrcania (disambiguation)
- Perkwunos, a possibly related ancient Celtic word
