= Alaa al-Tamimi =

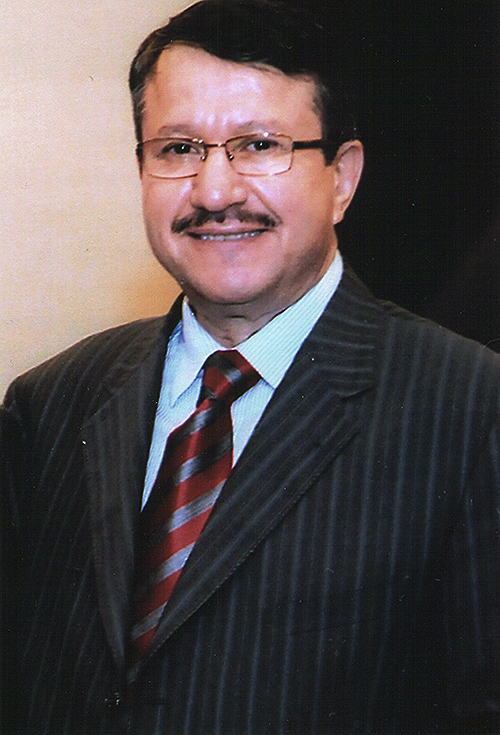

Mayor of Baghdad
- In office 2004 – 8 August 2005
- Preceded by: Sabir Abdul Aziz al-Douri
- Succeeded by: Hussein al-Tahan

Personal details
- Born: 1952 (age 73–74) Fallujah, Iraq
- Education: University of Baghdad; University of Paris
- Occupation: Politician, Engineer

Dr. Alaa (Ala') Al-Tamimi (born 1952, in Fallujah) was mayor of Baghdad in 2004 and 2005.

Al-Tamimi was chosen to be mayor of Baghdad on April 18, 2004, by Baghdad City Council members, with the approval of the U.S. and coalition forces. With a total of forty nine participants with voting authority being City Council members and District Council members, the City Council Selection Committee initially received 93 applications for the position of mayor in response to a highly publicized advertisement campaign in local Baghdad newspapers and other media outlets. From that group of applicants, twenty-eight were deemed to have fully satisfied the advertised criteria. Ultimately, the selection committee whittled down the number of applicants to eight, and submitted their names to the full council for consideration. The exceptionally well-qualified finalists included six PhDs, and seven with engineering backgrounds .. On May 29, 2004, he took office.

Al-Tamimi was removed from office on August 8, 2005, in dramatic fashion by an armed militia controlled by the provincial government. His replacement is a member of the Supreme Islamic Iraqi Council, which won control of Baghdad Governorate in the January 30, 2005 election. He was replaced by Hussein al-Tahan, the governor of Baghdad Governorate. Saber al Essawi followed Hussein al-Tahan as Mayor of Baghdad.

== Pre-political life ==
Al-Tamimi is a Muslim (yet politically secular). In 1972, al-Tamimi received his BSc in civil engineering, and, in 1979, his MSc in structural engineering, from Baghdad University. His PhD in structural engineering was received from the University Of Paris in 1985. He later wrote several books on the subject of engineering.

In 1987, al-Tamimi worked as a "director general" under Saddam Hussein's nuclear weapons program (which never succeeded in actually creating a nuclear bomb due to the interruption of the first Gulf War in 1990.)

In 1995, al-Tamimi fled from Iraq with his wife and son, and would not return despite the threats made by Hussein's secret police. He had been a professor of structural engineering at Baghdad University and then was forced to work for the Iraqi nuclear agency. But he wants it understood that he helped make buildings, not bombs.

He settled in Abu Dhabi, United Arab Emirates, where he worked as a Planning Ministry advisor in 1998. The Tamimis are now settled in Southern Ontario.

== al-Tamimi as Mayor ==
After the 2003 invasion of Iraq, the U.S. Coalition Provisional Authority, under Paul Bremer, sought the leadership potential of al-Tamimi as the new Mayor of Baghdad. He fulfilled the criteria for their ideal candidate: over 40, experience in engineering and urban planning, and sympathy for the "principles of democracy."

Al-Tamimi's first action, in coordination with U.S. Major General Peter W. Chiarelli, was to remove concrete barriers and blast walls that had inhibited the flow of traffic in Baghdad. Al-Tamimi has publicly stated his approval of the American removal of dictator Saddam Hussein, yet is critical of the American occupation. "I don’t want Americans in the Green Zone, or outside the Green Zone. I want them outside Baghdad in their camps."

After being elected, al-Tamimi threatened to hand in his resignation three times in protest against the under-funding of Baghdad's reconstruction. In January 2004, an Islamist Shiite provincial council was formed in Baghdad, which actively sought to replace al-Tamimi.

== Resignation ==
On June 21, 2005, al-Tamimi submitted his resignation from his mayoral post and was pensioned.

== External sources ==
- On-line Q & A with al-Tamimi in December 2004
- MSNBC profile (July 2004)
- News of ousting from Reuters, August 2005
- Interview with al-Tamimi, regarding the restoration of Baghdad from Radio Free Europe, April 22, 2005
- New York Times articles on the ousting

Preceded by Sabir Abdul Aziz al-Douri	Mayor of Baghdad, Iraq; 2004–2005	Succeeded by Hussein al-Tahan
