= Al-Abyad (Jinn) =

Silver Devil in Medieval Islam

The image represents one of the 7 Jinn kings, the king of Monday

Al-Malik Al-Abyad (The White King), also known as the "Father of Light," is the ruler of the jinn associated with Monday, the Moon, the color white, and silver. He belongs to the Marid tribe, the oldest and most powerful lineage of giant, humanoid-looking jinn. Although he is subject to the strict supervision of the angel Jibril (Gabriel), Al-Abyad is renowned as one of Iblis's (Satan's) closest associates within his court.

== Attributes ==
Known for his perverse nature, Al-Abyad historically persecuted prophets to lead them into sin; it was he who incited the famous monk Barsisa to seduction and murder. A bitter enemy of the Prophet Muhammad, he attempted to deceive him by appearing to him in the false guise of the angel Jibril. The plan was foiled by the divine insight granted to the Prophet, and Jibril banished him and exiled him to the remotest regions of India, where he remains confined to this day. In esoteric practices, his invocation requires a specific ritual preceded by 40 days of abstinence from meat.

== Representation ==
In traditional miniatures and texts, his figure is portrayed through a blend of demonic anatomy and detailed visual features:

He is described as a white, horned demon with golden eyes and feral traits, characterized by fangs, drooping ears, and deep folds of wrinkled flesh on his cheeks. In illustrations, he appears as an elderly jinn with tan-yellow skin, wearing a blue stole over his shoulders and orange shorts. He is depicted with bent knees while interacting with two other demons: one with a pale pink complexion, kneeling with a finger pointed toward his mouth, and a second, blue-green demon standing behind him.

== See Also ==
- Al-Madhab
- Al-Ahmar
- Barqan
- Shamharush
- Zawba'ah
- Maymun
