= Al-Amriki =

Al-Amriki (Arabic: الأمريكي, lit. 'The American'; also transliterated as al-Ameriki, al-Amreeki, al-Amriky, or al-Amrikee) is an Arabic nisbah denoting a relationship to or from the United States. It may refer to:

- Abu Hamza al-Amriki (born 1992), Albanian-American senior commander and recruiter within the Islamic State, born Zulfi Hoxha
- Abu Hurayra al-Amriki (1991–2014), American member of the al-Nusra Front who carried out a suicide bombing in Syria, born Moner Mohammad Abu Salha
- Abu Mansoor Al-Amriki (1984–2013), American leader in the Somali Islamist militant group al-Shabaab, born Omar Hammami
- Abu Taha al-Amriki, American punk musician and vocalist for the Taqwacore band Fedayeen
- Ali Mohamed (double agent) (born 1952), Egyptian-American double agent for the CIA and Islamist militant groups, known as "al-Amriki"
- Azzam al-Amriki (1978–2015), American senior member and spokesperson for al-Qaeda, born Adam Gadahn
- Abu Abdul Barr al-Amriki, pseudonym bestowed posthumously by the Islamic State upon Las Vegas mass shooter Stephen Paddock (1953–2017)
- Anwar al-Amriki, pseudonym of Jehad Mostafa (born 1981), American leader within al-Shabaab
- Bashir al-Ameriki, pseudonym of Bryant Neal Vinas (born 1982), American member of al-Qaeda who later cooperated with U.S. authorities
- Nuh Amriki, pseudonym of Nicholas Rovinski (born 1991), American citizen who pleaded guilty to conspiring to provide material support to the Islamic State

== See also ==
- Nisba (onomastics)
