= Al-Almani =

al-Almani (Arabic: الألماني) is a nisba meaning "German" or from Germany. It may refer to:

- Abu Talha al-Almani, Denis Cuspert, ISIL terrorist
- Abu Umar al-Almani, Yamin Abou-Zand, ISIL terrorist
