= Al-Sijistani =

Al-Sijistani (Persian: سجستانی and السجستانی) refers to people from the historic Sijistan region in present-day Sistan, the border region of eastern Iran and southwestern Afghanistan.

Prominent people who have been called Al-Sijistani include:

- Abu Da'ud Sulayman ibn Ash`ath al-Azadi al-Sijistani (817-888 CE), ("Abu Dawūd"), collector of hadith
- Abu Yaqub Sijistani (died c. 971 CE), Neoplatonist and Ismaili missionary
- Abu Sulayman Muhammad al-Sijistani (c. 932 - c. 1000 CE), Islamic philosopher, flourished in Baghdad
- Al-Sijzi (c. 945 - c. 1020 CE), mathematician and astronomer
- Masʽud ibn Muhammad Sijzi, 14th-century Persian physician
- Amir Hasan Ala Sijzi Dehlavi (1242-1325 CE), Indo-Persian poet, scholar and Sufi

== See also ==
- Ali al-Sistani (born 1930), Iraqi Grand Ayatollah
- Muhammad-Ridha al-Sistani (born 1962), Iraqi Islamic scholar and professor
