= Jalaluddin al-Tunisi =

Mohamed ben Salem al-Ayouni
- Arabic: محمد بن سالم التونسي

Personal details
- Born: 1982 (age 43–44) M'saken, Tunisia

Military service
- Allegiance: Islamic State – Libya Province
- Years of service: 2011-present
- Battles/wars: Syrian Civil War; Libyan Civil War (2014–present)

Mohammed ben Salem al-Ayouni (Arabic: محمد بن سالم التونسي; born 1982), known as Jalaluddin al-Tunisi (Arabic: جلالا لتونسي) is a Tunisian Islamic militant and emir of the Tarablus province of the Islamic State in Libya.

== History ==
He was born in 1982 in M'saken, a town in the Sousse Governorate of Tunisia. He emigrated to France in the 1990s and obtained French citizenship before returning to Tunisia in 2011 after the Tunisian Revolution.

In late 2011, he moved to Syria to participate in the civil war there. He joined the Islamic State in 2014 after the killing of the commander of the Ghoraba battalion. In the same year he appeared in one of the most well-known Islamic State videos called "Breaking the Border" in which he speaks alongside Abu Muhammad al-Adnani, the second most senior IS leader before his death.

In 2016 he was made the emir of the Islamic State in Tarablus, province in Libya. It is reported that he is very close to Islamic State leader Abu Bakr al-Baghdadi who believes he is able to win battles and maintain good relations with other Islamic groups in North Africa.

After al-Baghdadi death, it was reported al-Tunisi as a candidate to lead ISIL.
