= Gorgan, Kermanshah =

Gorgan گرگان
- Village
- Location within Iran
- Coordinates: 34°44′35″N 46°51′33″E
- Country: Iran
- Province: Kermanshah
- County: Kermanshah
- Bakhsh: Central
- Rural District: Razavar

Population (2006)
  - Total: 508
- Time zone: UTC+3:30 (IRST)

Gorgan (Persian: گرگان, also Romanized as Gorgān) is a village in Razavar Rural District, in the Central District of Kermanshah County, Kermanshah Province, Iran. At the 2006 census, its population was 508, in 108 families.
