= Hussein al-Tahan =

Iraqi politician (born 1955)

Hussein Al-Tahan (Arabic: حسين الطحان; born 1955) was the governor of Baghdad in Iraq from 2005 to 2009. He took the position in 2005 after his predecessor Ali al-Haidari was assassinated.
