= Al-Jurjani =

Al-Jurjani or simply Jurjani may refer to any of several historical Persian scholars:

- Abu Sa'id al-Darir al-Jurjani (died 845), mathematician and astronomer
- Al-Masihi, Abu Sahl al-Masihi al-Jurjani (960–1000), physician and teacher of Avicenna
- Abd al-Qahir al-Jurjani (died 1078), scholar of the Arabic language, literary theorist and grammarian
- Zayn al-Din al-Jurjani (1040–1136), royal Islamic physician and author of the Thesaurus of the Shah of Khwarazm
- Al-Sharif al-Jurjani (1339–1414), Sunni Hanafi Muslim scholar
- Rustam Jurjani, 16th century physician who lived in India and author of the Supplies Of Nizamshah

== See also ==
- Gorgani (disambiguation)
- Astarabadi
