= Hussein al-Yemeni =

Suspected al-Qaeda member

Hussein al-Yemeni was a suspected Al-Qaeda terrorist group member believed to have played a part in the December 2009 attack on CIA employees in Afghanistan. While there are no witnesses who claim to know what he looks like, he was thought to be in his later twenties or early thirties.

== Terrorist ties ==
al-Yemeni was believed to have ties to terrorist groups in Yemen, Afghanistan as well as Pakistan.

== Attack on CIA in Afghanistan ==
On December 30, 2009, on an American base in southeastern Afghanistan's Khost Province there was an explosion that killed seven CIA employees and contractors.

== Death ==
Hussein al-Yemeni is believed to have been a victim of an early March strike in the Miran Shah area of Pakistan. Officials will not confirm his death or release specific details on the strike.

This strike is only one of many carried out through February and March 2010. Drone attacks have killed five other suspected terrorists and there have been several arrests.

According to a US official: "Al-Yemeni would be the latest victory in a systematic campaign that has pounded al Qaeda and its allies, depriving them of leaders, plotters, and fighters…For them, there can be neither safety nor rest."
