= Nabilah al-Tunisi =

- نبيلة التونسي
- Born: 1959 (age 66–67); Riyadh, Saudi Arabia
- Education: University of Portland (BS); Oregon State University (MS); Stanford University (SEP)
- Occupations: Engineer, Executive
- Known for: First female Chief Engineer of Saudi Aramco; First female Chair of Tadawul
- Title: Chief Engineer (2015–Present)
- Awards: Academy of Distinguished Engineers (OSU); Forbes 200 Most Powerful Arab Women

Nabilah al-Tunisi (born c. 1959) (Arabic:نبيلة التونسي), was the first woman to hold the title of chief engineer at Saudi Aramco. In 2017 Al-Tunisi became the first female chairman of the Saudi Stock Exchange (Tadawul).

== Early life and education ==
The daughter of a Saudi general, Al-Tunisi grew up in Riyadh. When she was 12, her family moved to Spain where her father became a military attaché at the Saudi Embassy in Madrid. While in Spain, she attended a Spanish-American school and took Arabic lessons at night. At the age of 15, she returned and completed high school in Riyadh. But at the age of 17, she moved to Portland, Oregon to study electrical engineering at Lewis & Clark College, with encouragement from her parents and where her brother was also studying. Al-Tunisi's fascination with computers came as she was preparing for the requisite English test.

By 1980 she had gained a Bachelor in Electrical and Computer Engineering from the University of Portland and a masters in computer engineering from Oregon State University.

Al-Tunisi also completed the Stanford’s Executive Business Program in 2007, after being rejected two decades earlier for the Master's program there in Computer engineering.

== Career ==
Her uncle, a friend of the Saudi oil minister, encouraged her to apply to Saudi Aramco, in Houston. Al-Tunisi had first searched and applied for various positions in the tech industry, including Microsoft, and PG&E. She even turned down a job with Apple Inc. before she joined the company as a computer systems engineer in 1982. In 1984, she moved to the engineering and project management division. In 1996, she led the company´s planning department for IT facilities and electrical networks.

She served as General Manager of Northern Area Project Management in Saudi Aramco. For Saudi Aramco, she also directed one of the largest hydrocarbon and petrochemical complex. Al-Tunisi developed software to monitor oil assets and implemented automation systems for the transport of oil and gas.

She became the chief engineer of Aramco in 2015. In 2018, the Sadara Chemical Company opened for business. The joint project between Saudi Aramco and Dow Chemical was led by Al-Tunisi and took nearly 10 years of planning. She is also preparing the plastic production crude oil-to-chemical plant together with Saudi Arabian Basic Industries Corporation.

Al-Tunisi is currently Managing Director of energy and water sector at Neom.

== Distinctions ==
- In 2006, she was named on the 25 Most Influential Women in Project Management.
- In 2010 Oregon State University honored her with membership of their Academy of Distinguished Engineers.
- In 2014 Forbes Middle East listed her at # 4 in their list of the 200 Most Powerful Arab Women in Executive Management.
- In 2018, she ranked 17th on the Forbes List of most influential women in the Middle East.
