= Astarabadi =

Astarabadi (Persian: استرآبادی) is an Iranian surname, derived from the city of "Astarabad" (former name of Gorgan) in northern Iran. It may refer to:

- Aziz ibn Ardashir Astarabadi (fl. ca. 1400), author of the Bazm u Razm
- Bibi Khatoon Astarabadi (1858 or 1859 – 1921), Iranian writer, satirist, and women's movement leader
- Fazlallah Astarabadi (c. 1340–1395), Iranian mystic, founder of the Ḥurūfī movement
- Mirza Mehdi Khan Astarabadi (18th century), Iranian Chief Minister
- Muhammad Ali Astarabadi (15th century), Iranian physician
- Muhammad Amin al-Astarabadi (died 1626), Iranian theologian

== See also ==
- Gorgani (disambiguation)
- al-Jurjani
