= Abu Osama al-Tunisi (died 2007) =

Tunisian militant

- Born: Tunisia
- Died: September 25, 2007; Iraq
- Cause of death: Airstrike
- Citizenship: Tunisia
- Military career
- Allegiance: Al-Qaeda in Iraq

Abu Osama al-Tunisi (d. September 25, 2007) was a Tunisian militant believed to have played one of the most important leadership role in Al-Qaeda in Iraq. The United States reported that he, and two of his aides, were killed by air strikes.
