= Ali ibn Ziyad =

Libyan Muslim jurist (d. 799 CE)

Ali ibn Ziyad at-Tarabulsi al-Tunisi al-'Absi
- Title: Ali ibn Ziyad

Personal life
- Born: Tripoli, Muhallabid Dynasty, Abbasid Caliphate
- Died: 799 CE (183 AH) Tunis, Muhallabid Dynasty, Abbasid Caliphate
- Era: Abbasid Caliphate
- Region: Medina and Tunis
- Main interest: Fiqh
- Occupation: Muslim jurist

Religious life
- Religion: Islam
- Jurisprudence: Maliki
- Creed: Sunni

Ali ibn Ziyad at-Tarabulsi al-'Absi (d. 799 CE) (183 AH) (Arabic: علي بن زياد الطرابلسي العبسي), more commonly referred to in Islamic scholarship as Ali ibn Ziyad or Imam al-Tarabulsi, was an 8th-century CE Libyan Muslim jurist from Tripoli. Ibn Ziyad was an important early scholar of the Maliki school of Islamic jurisprudence (fiqh) and a companion of Imam Malik. Ali ibn Ziyad was responsible for bringing the Muwatta of Imam Malik to Ifriqiya. He died in 799 CE and is buried in the remains of the Silsila Cemetery in the Qasba quarter of Tunis's medina (old-town).
