= Book of Wonders =

Late 14th-century Arabic illustrated manuscript

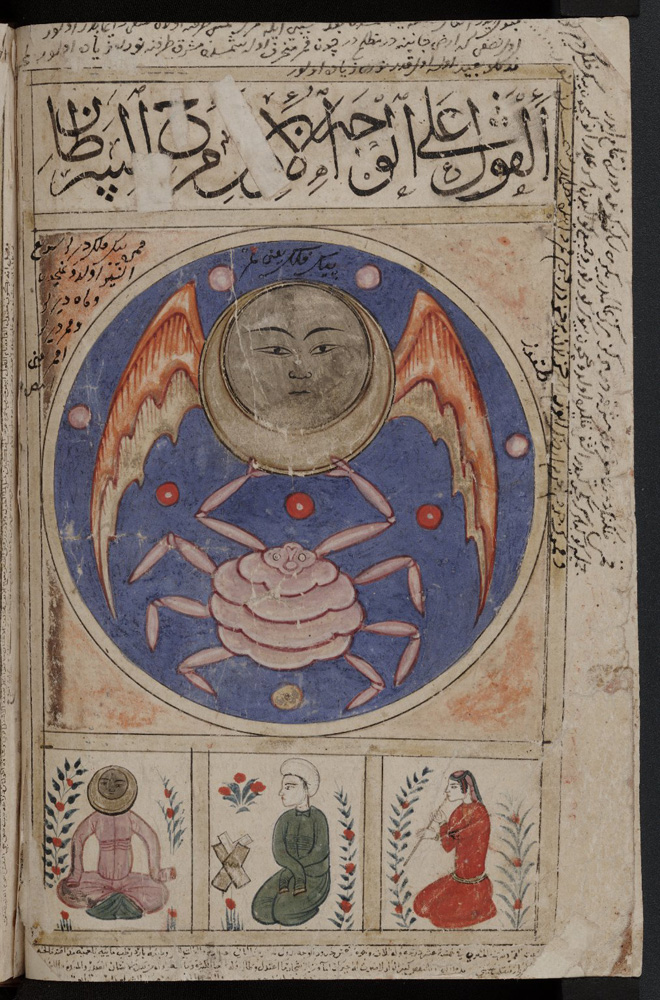
Cancer (al-Saraṭān), one of the signs of the Zodiac depicted in the manuscript

The Kitāb al-Bulhān (Arabic: كتاب البلهان), commonly translated as the Book of Wonders and also rendered by the art historian Stefano Carboni as the Book of Surprises, is an illustrated Arabic manuscript and compilation of works on astrology, astronomy, divination, geomancy, magic, and demonology.

The principal part of the surviving manuscript was produced in the late Jalayirid period, probably in Baghdad, and is dated to around 1399–1400. It is associated with ʿAbd al-Ḥasan ibn Aḥmad ibn ʿAlī ibn al-Ḥasan al-Iṣfahānī, whose family name indicates origins in Isfahan. David Pingree identifies al-Iṣfahānī as the author of the Kitāb al-Bulhān and states that he composed it around 1400 for Ḥusayn ibn Aḥmad ibn Muḥammad al-Irbilī.

The manuscript is now preserved in the Bodleian Library at the University of Oxford as MS. Bodl. Or. 133. The surviving codex is a composite manuscript: portions of its original contents were lost and the remaining sections were subsequently rebound in an order that does not always preserve the original sequence. The Bodleian manuscript contains 83 illustrations, including numerous full-page miniatures.

== Contents ==
The Kitāb al-Bulhān combines astronomical and astrological material with divinatory, talismanic and marvelous literature. Its illustrated sections include representations of the zodiac signs, planets, the lunar mansions, demons and jinn, prophets, legendary places, marvelous buildings and other subjects associated with medieval Arabic literature on wonders.

Among the material incorporated into the compilation are passages connected with the Kitāb al-Mawālīd ("Book of Nativities") attributed to the influential Persian astrologer Abu Ma'shar al-Balkhi. The astrological illustrations include the twelve zodiacal signs and images concerned with planetary influences, exaltations and dejections. Other sections include representations of the twenty-eight lunar mansions and a celebrated series of supernatural beings associated with the days of the week.

The manuscript also contains material concerned with geomancy and several forms of divination. Some of its later portions were copied by al-Irbilī himself, including divinatory works traditionally associated with Ja'far al-Sadiq.

== Illustrations and iconography ==
The manuscript is particularly noted for its rich and unusual iconography. Alongside conventional astronomical and zodiacal imagery are representations of supernatural figures, including Iblis, various kings of the jinn, demons and other beings. Many of these figures are accompanied by talismanic signs, letters, numerical arrangements or magical diagrams.

The illustrations provide important evidence for the visual culture of the late Jalayirid period and for the interaction of Arabic and Persianate artistic traditions in medieval Iraq. Carboni has noted that, although the manuscript is written predominantly in Arabic, it was produced in a Jalayirid cultural environment in which Arabic and Persian literary and artistic traditions interacted closely.

The manuscript also belongs to the broader medieval Islamic tradition of ʿajāʾib ("wonders") literature. Carboni therefore proposed translating the unusual word bulhān as "surprises" rather than simply "wonders", and referred to the work as the Book of Surprises.

== Provenance ==
The manuscript was made for, or was closely associated with, al-Ḍiyāʾ Ḥusayn al-Irbilī, a man whose family originated in Erbil. An ownership inscription records its transfer in 812 AH (1409–1410 CE) to Ḥaydar ibn al-Ḥājj ʿAbd al-Karīm ibn Muḥammad.

The manuscript was later owned by Yaḥyā ibn Muḥammad in Edirne in the early seventeenth century. It eventually reached England and entered the Bodleian Library as part of the bequest of Nathaniel Palmer in 1717.

Because a number of folios from the original manuscript are missing and its surviving sections were rebound out of sequence, later copies have proved useful for reconstructing aspects of its original arrangement. Carboni identified Ottoman copies derived from the work that preserve material no longer present in the Oxford manuscript.

== Gallery ==
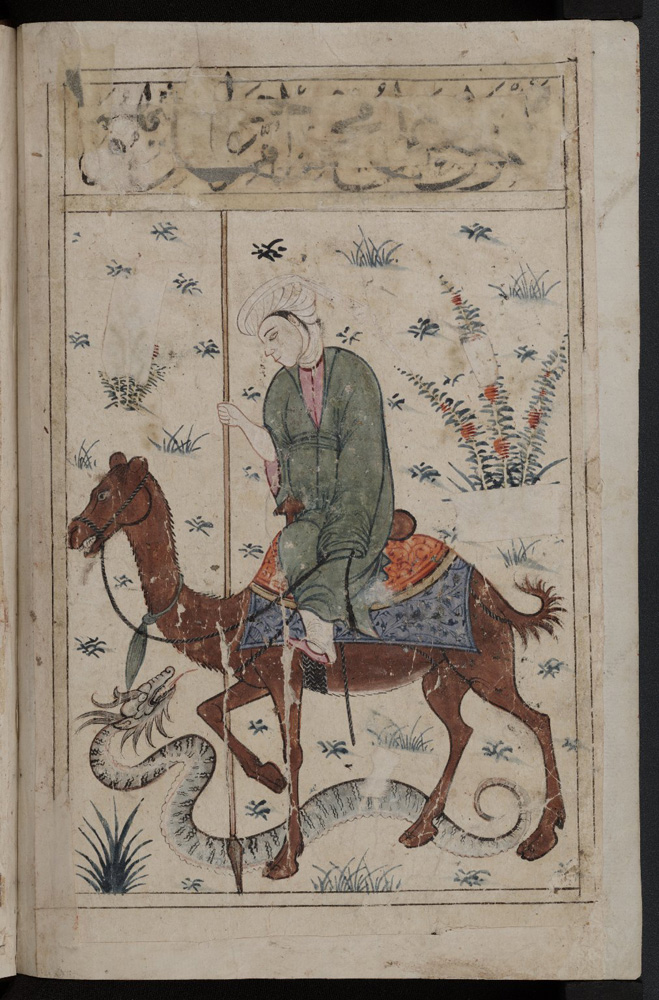
A man, mounted on a camel, killing a snake with a lance.

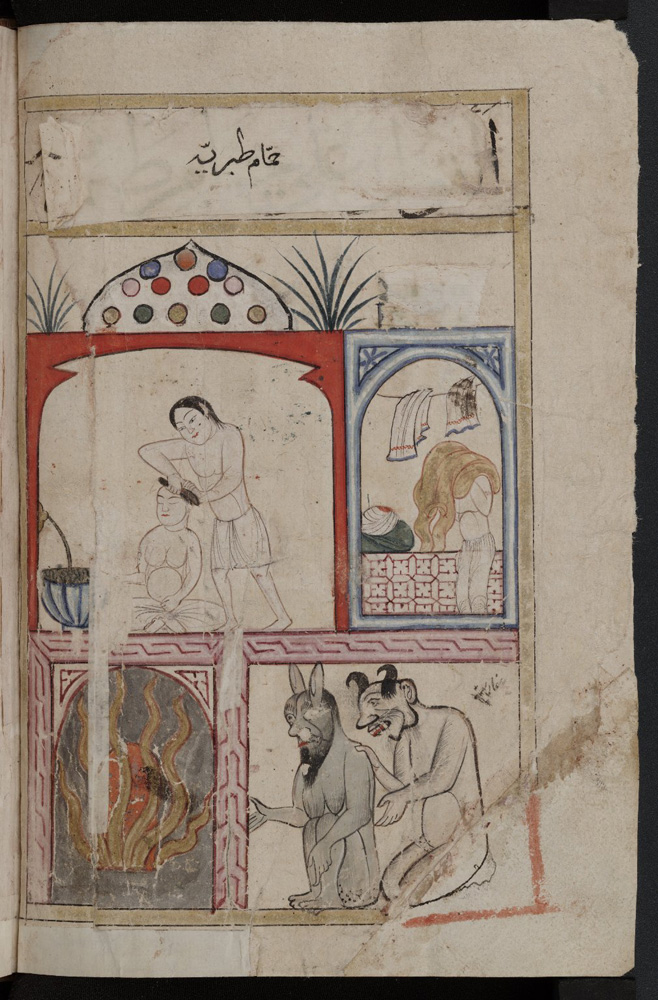
The baths of Tiberius. Men bathing while demons tend the furnace.

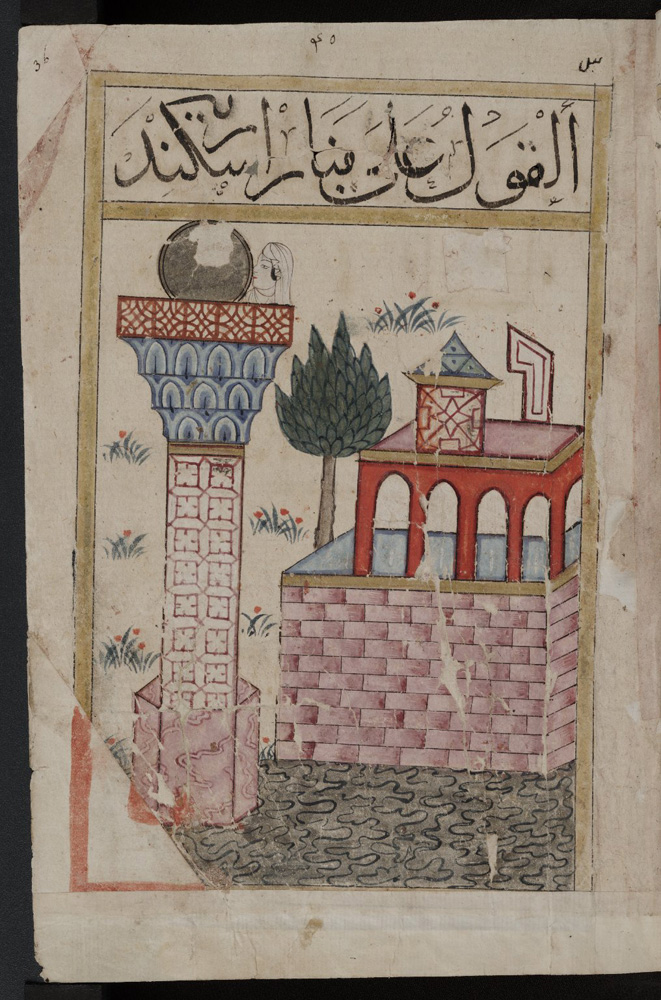
The Lighthouse of Alexandria.

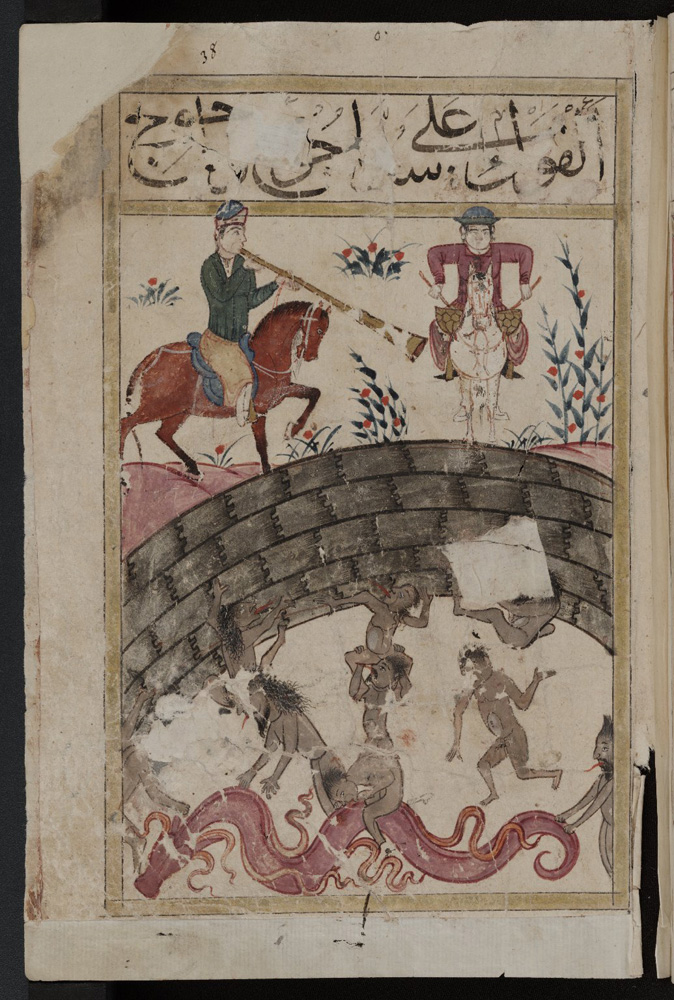
The wall of Gog and Magog.

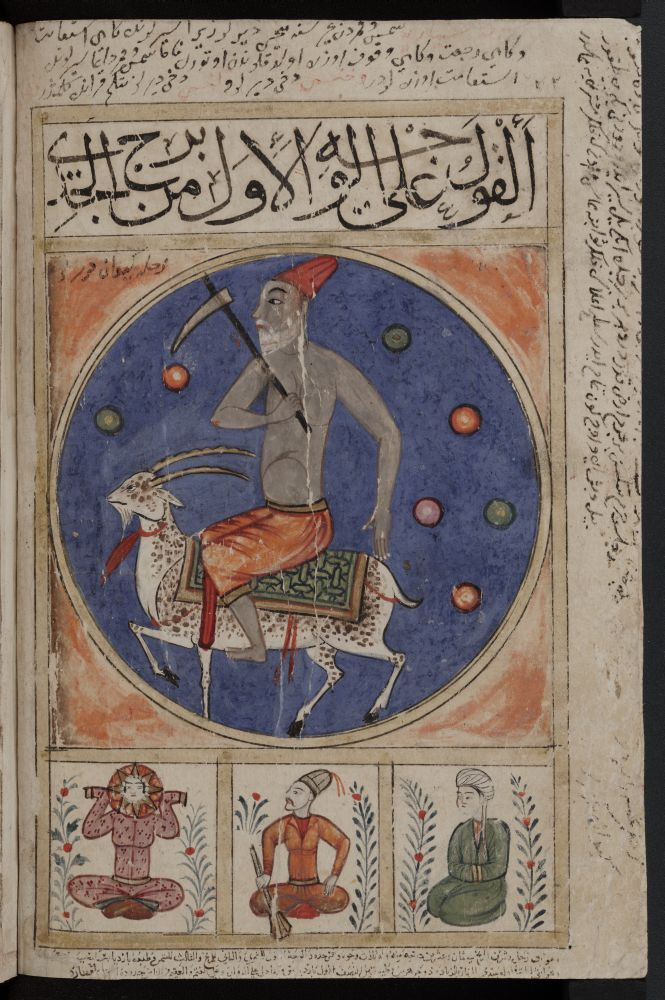
Capricorn (al-Jadī), one of the signs of the Zodiac.

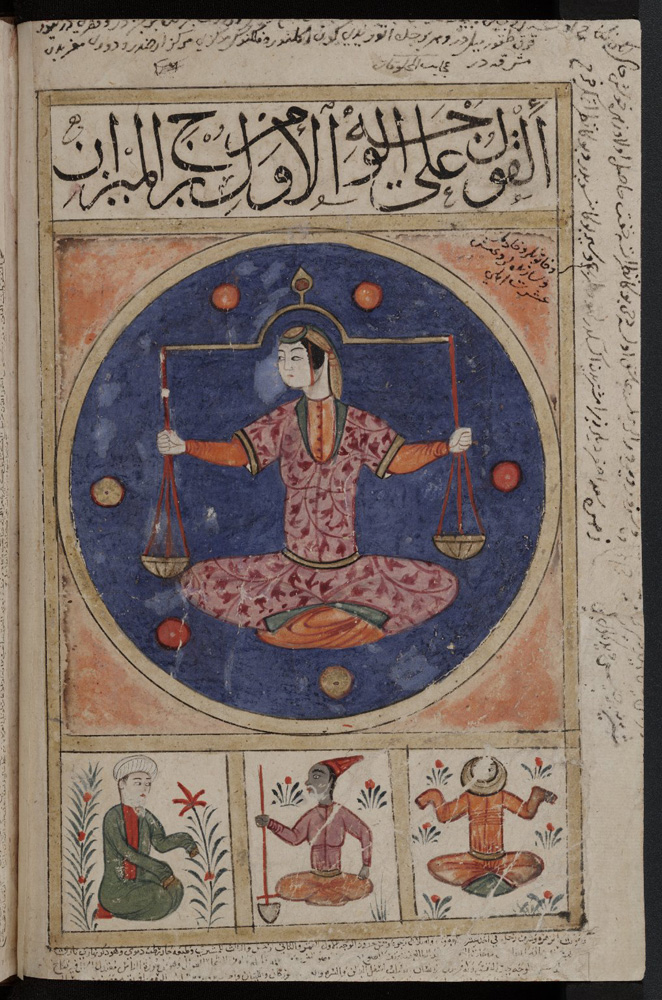
Libra (al-Mīzān), one of the signs of the Zodiac.

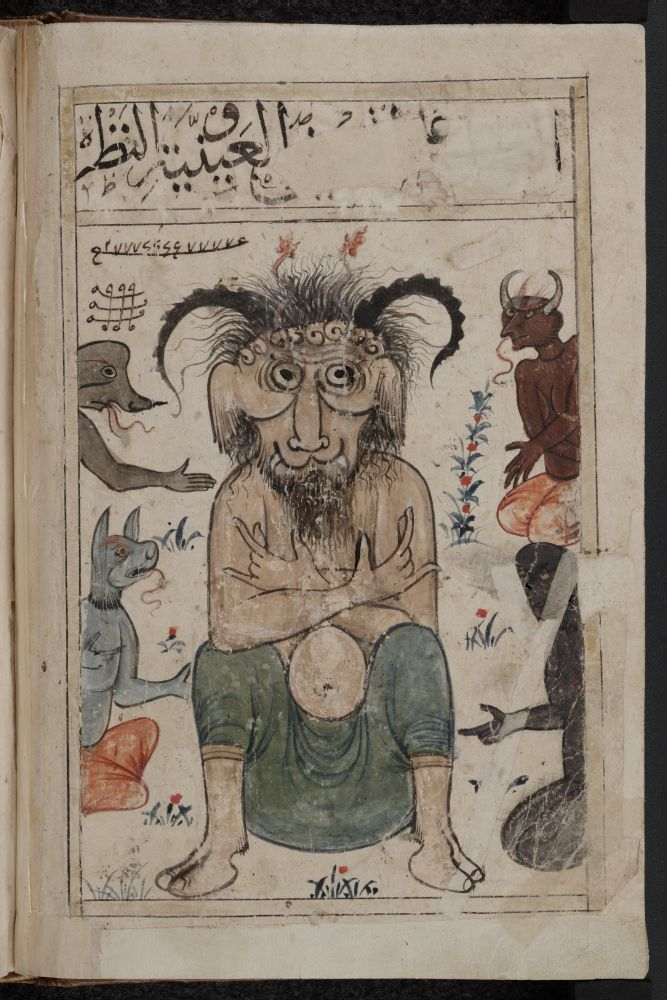
Iblis, surrounded by lesser demons.

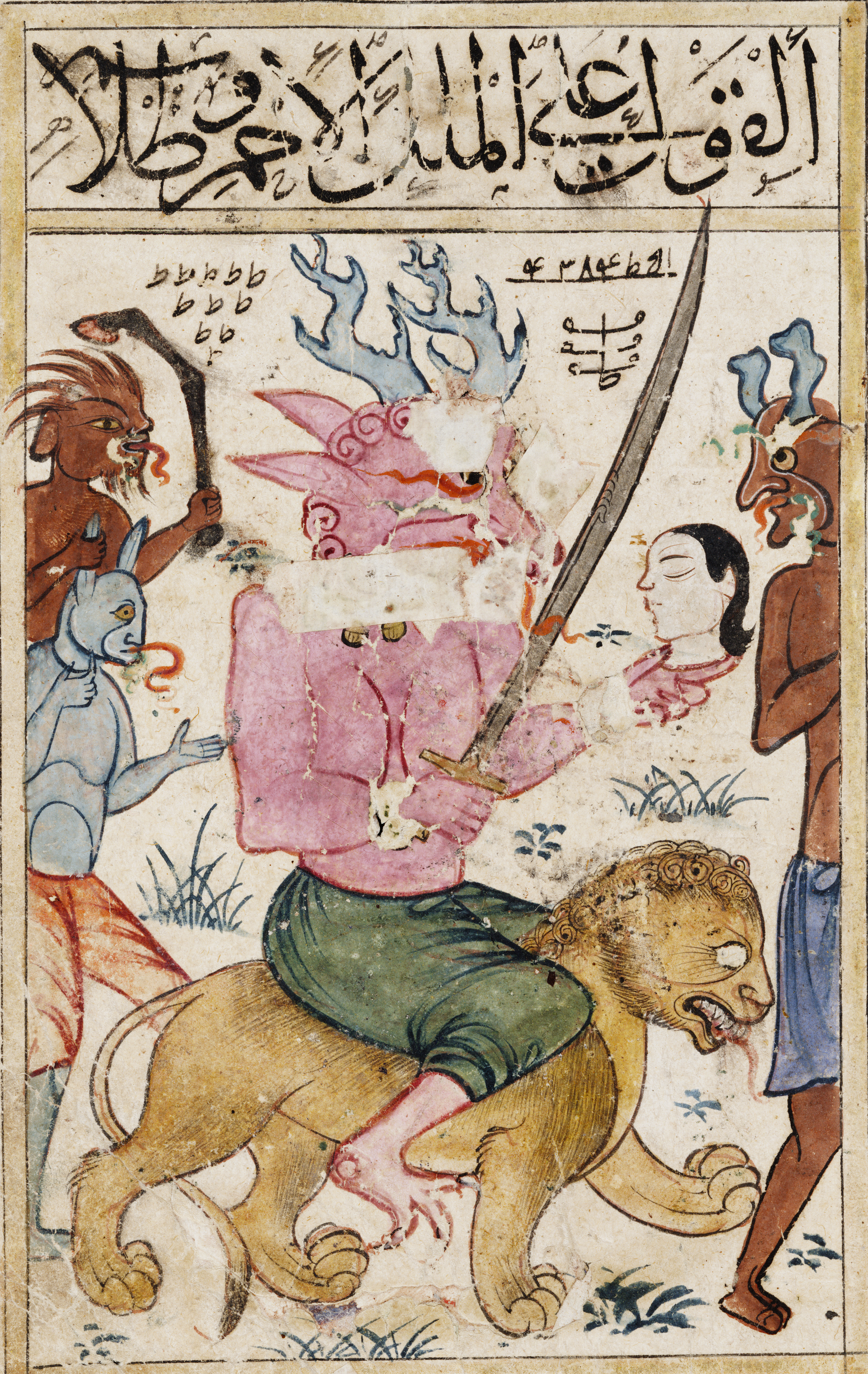
Al-Aḥmar ("the Red King"), the jinn king associated with Tuesday.

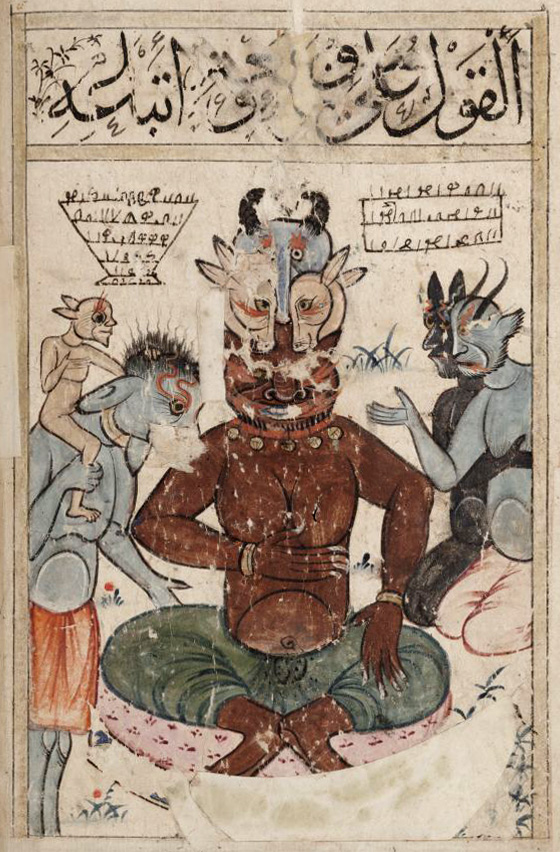
Zawbaʿa, a jinn king associated with Friday.

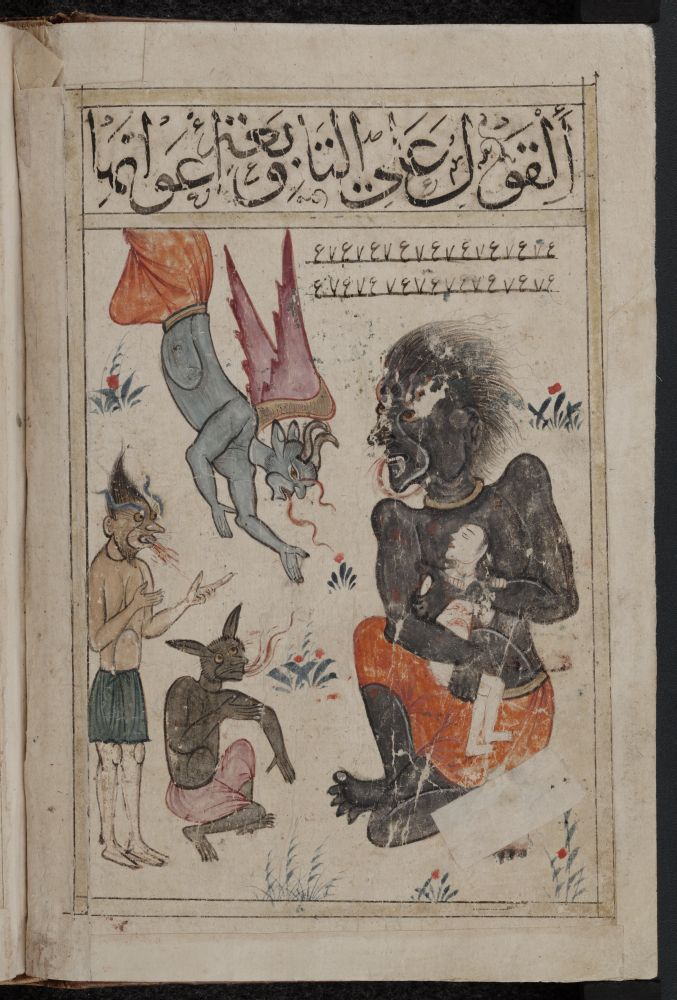
Tābiʿa, a female demon associated in folklore with childbirth.

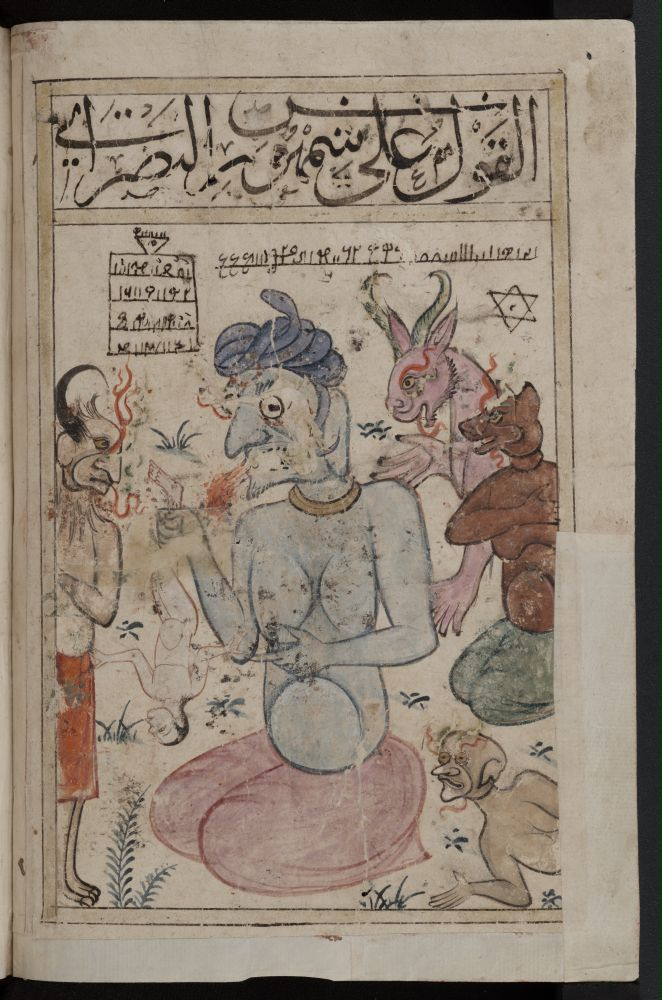
Shamhurish, a jinn king associated with Thursday.

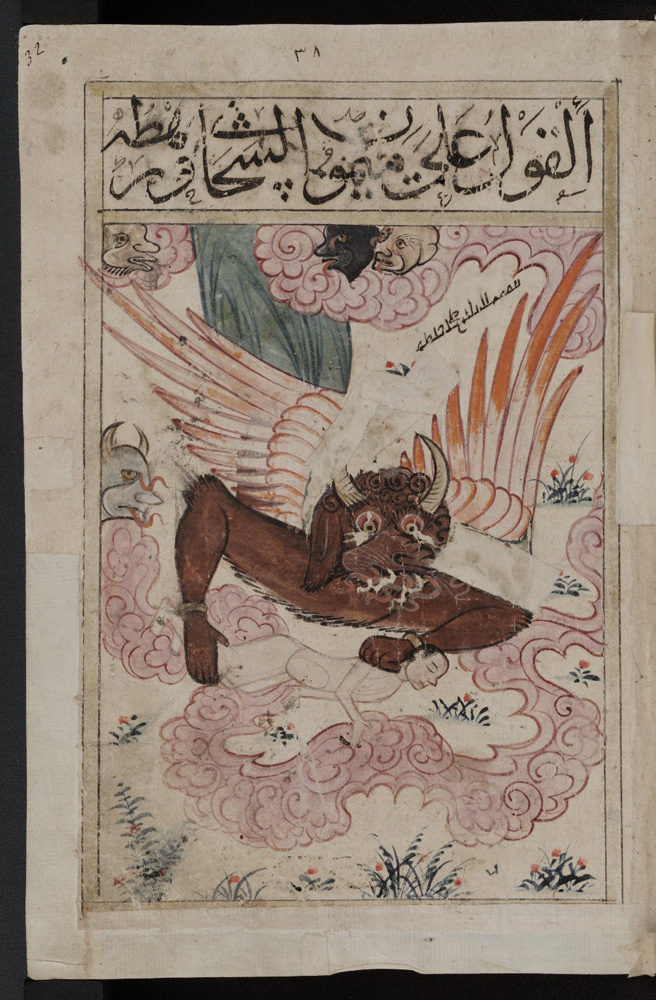
Maymūn, a jinn king associated with Saturday.

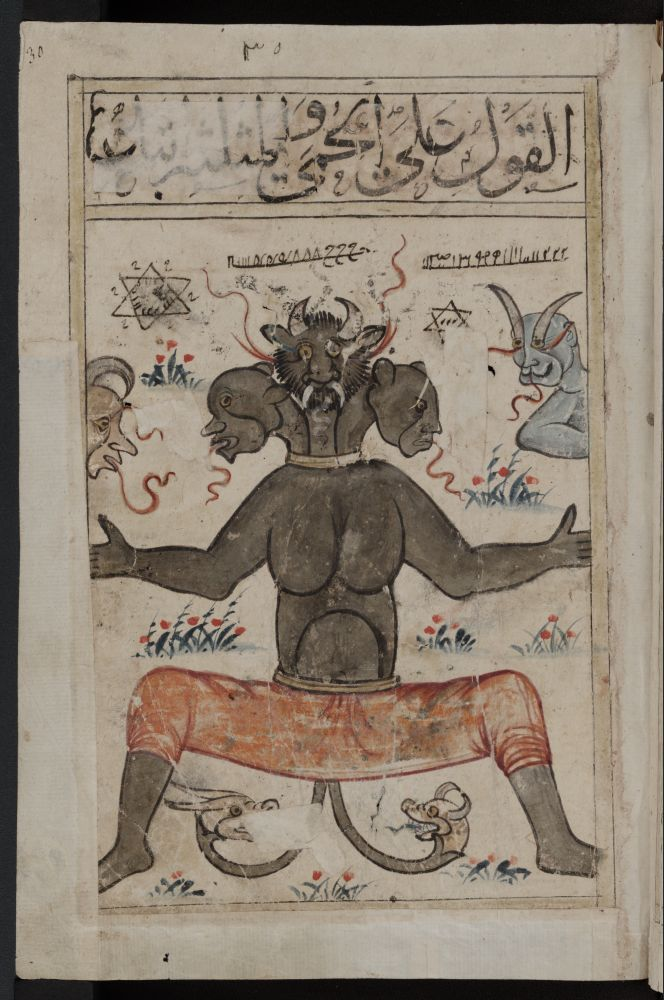
Huma, a three-headed supernatural figure.

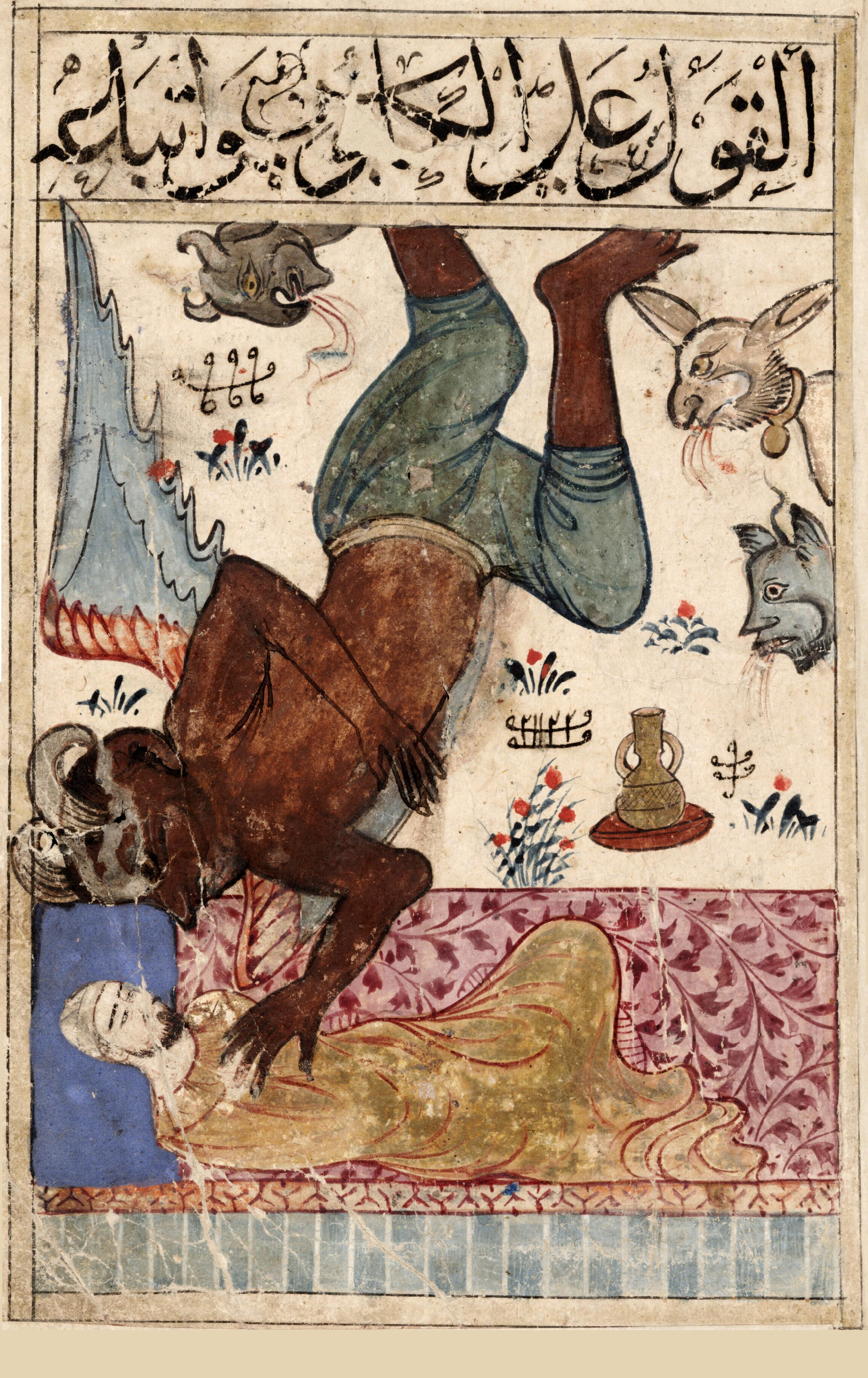
Kābūs, a demon associated with nightmares.

== See also ==
- The Book of Felicity
- Abu Ma'shar al-Balkhi
- Islamic astrology
- Islamic cosmology
- Magic in the Islamic world
- Aja'ib al-makhluqat
