= List of Asian Australians =

This article is a list of notable Asian Australians.

== Academia ==
- Vanessa Woods (born 1977), Australian scientist, author
- Victor Chang (1936–1991), Chinese-born Australian cardiac surgeon

== Activists ==
- Yang Hengjun (born 1965), Chinese-Australian writer and businessman
- Danny Lim (activist) (born 1944), Malaysian-born Australian activist
- Mariam Mohammed, Pakistani-Australian gender equity activist

== Arts/architecture/design ==
- Van Thanh Rudd (born 1973), Australian artist and politician
- William Yang (born 1943), Chinese-Australian photographer

== Business and industry ==
- Janusz Hooker (born 1969), Australian businessman
- Leslie Joseph Hooker (1903–1976), Australian businessman
- Marita Cheng (born 1989), Australian entrepreneur
- Taj Pabari, British-born Australian entrepreneur

== Culinary ==
- Diana Chan (born 1988), Malaysian-born Australian cook and television personality
- Elizabeth Chong (born 1931), Chinese-born Australian chef and entertainer
- Marion Grasby (born 1982), Australian chef, journalist and author
- Kylie Kwong (born 1969), Australian chef, author and restaurateur
- Melissa Leong (born 1982), Australian freelance food writer, food critic and television personality
- Adam Liaw (born 1978), Malaysian-born Australian cook, television presenter and author
- Hetty Lui McKinnon, Australian Chinese cookbook author
- Luke Nguyen (born 1978), Vietnamese–Australian chef, restaurateur and television presenter
- Khanh Ong (born 1993), Australian cook, television personality, author and restaurateur
- Poh Ling Yeow (born 1973), Malaysian-born Australian cook and entertainer

== Entertainment ==
=== Actors and filmmakers ===
- Anh Do (born 1977), Vietnamese-born Australian author, actor, and comedian
- Anne Curtis (born 1985), Australian-born Filipino entertainer
- Anthony Brandon Wong (born 1965), Australian actor
- Bob Morley (born 1984), Australian actor
- Charlotte Nicdao (born 1991), Australian actress
- Chris Pang (born 1984), Australian actor and producer
- Dichen Lachman (born 1982), Nepalese-born Australian actress and model
- Gareth Yuen, Australian actor
- Gemma Pranita (born 1985), Thai-born Australian actress
- Geraldine Viswanathan (born 1995), Australian actress
- James Wan (born 1977), Malaysian-born Australian filmmaker
- Jasmine Curtis-Smith (born 1994), Australian-born Filipino actress
- Jason Keng-Kwin Chan (born 1971), Malaysian-born Australian actor
- John Harlan Kim (born 1993), Australian Korean actor
- Jordan Rodrigues (born 1992), Australian actor
- Maria Tran (born 1985), Vietnamese-Australian actress, martial artist, and director
- Natalie Tran (born 1986), Australian entertainer
- Pallavi Sharda (born 1988), Australian actress
- Remy Hii (born c. 1986), Malaysian-Australian actor
- Shioli Kutsuna (born 1992), Australian Japanese actress
- Stephanie Jacobsen (born 1980), Hong Kong-born Australian actress
- Matthew Victor Pastor (born 1989), Australian film director
- Vico Thai (born 1981), Australian actor
- Yerin Ha (born 1995), Australian actress

=== Music ===
- Belle Chen (born 1988), Australian-Taiwanese pianist, composer, and producer
- Christian Li (born 2007), Australian violinist
- Dami Im (born 1988), Australian singer and songwriter
- Faith Yang (born 1974), Taiwanese Australian musician
- Guy Sebastian (born 1981), Malaysian-born Australian singer
- Jeff Fatt (born 1953), Chinese Australian musician and actor
- Mahalia Barnes (born 1982), Australian singer
- Jessica Mauboy (born 1989), Australian singer
- John Williams (guitarist) (born 1941), Australian classical guitarist
- Kate Ceberano (born 1966), Australian singer and actress
- Matt Hsu's Obscure Orchestra, Taiwanese-Australian musician and composer
- Hanni (singer) (born 2004), Vietnamese-Australian singer, member of girl group NewJeans

== Fashion ==
- Jenny Kee (born 1947), Australian fashion designer
- Jessica Gomes (born 1985), Australian model
- Nadya Hutagalung (born 1974), Indonesian-Australian model, actress, and presenter
- Samantha Downie (born 1987), Australian model
- Zinnia Kumar, Australian model

== Law ==
- David Flint (born 1938), Australian legal academic

== Literature ==
- Adam Aitken (born 1960), Australian poet
- Jessica Au, Australian editor and bookseller
- Anh Do (born 1977), Vietnamese-born Australian author
- Merlinda Bobis (born 1959), Filipina-Australian writer and academic
- Alison Broinowski (born 1941), Australian academic and journalist
- Brian Castro (born 1950), Australian novelist and essayist
- Shankari Chandran (born c. 1975), British-Australian novelist
- Melanie Cheng, Australian author and doctor
- Hoa Pham, Australian author
- Michelle de Kretser (born 1957), Sri Lanka-born Australian novelist
- Benjamin Law (writer) (born c. 1982), Australian author, screenwriter and journalist
- Michelle Law, Australian writer
- Simone Lazaroo, Singaporean-born Australian author
- Nam Le (born 1978), Vietnamese-born Australian writer
- Suneeta Peres da Costa, Australian author
- Alice Pung (born 1981), Australian writer, editor and lawyer
- Annette Shun Wah (born 1958), Australian freelance writer and entertainer
- Elizabeth Tan (author) (born 1988), Australian novelist
- Gabrielle Wang, Australian Author, Australian Children's Laureate 2022-23
- Grace Yee, Australian poet and writer

== Military ==
- Billy Sing (1886–1943), Australian soldier

== Politics ==
20 Asian Australian people have been members of the Parliament of Australia (the Federal Parliament), including ten each in the Senate and the House of Representatives. The most common represented ethnicity are Chinese Australian (nine) and Indian Australian (three). There are eight incumbent Asian Australian parliamentarians as of 2022.

=== Federal Parliament ===
==== Senate ====
Senator		Ethnicity	Party	State	Tenure		Notes
Senator		Ethnicity	Party	State	Term start	Term end	Notes
	Tsebin Tchen (1941–2019)	Chinese	Liberal	Victoria	1 July 1999	30 June 2005	Retired
Sen. Wong	Penny Wong (born 1968)	Chinese (Malaysian Chinese)	Labor	South Australia	1 July 2002	Incumbent	
Sen. Singh	Lisa Singh (born 1972)	Indian	Labor	Tasmania	1 July 2011	30 June 2019	Lost reelection
	Dio Wang (born 1981)	Chinese	Palmer United	Western Australia	1 July 2014	2 July 2016	Lost reelection
Sen. Faruqi	Mehreen Faruqi (born 1963)	Pakistani	Greens	New South Wales	15 August 2018	Incumbent	
Sen. Payman	Fatima Payman (born 1995)	Afghan	Labor (to 2024); Australia's Voice (from 2024)	Western Australia	1 July 2022	Incumbent	
Sen. Sharma	Dave Sharma (born 1975)	Indian	Liberal	New South Wales	30 November 2023	Incumbent	
	Varun Ghosh (born 1985)	Indian	Labor	Western Australia	1 February 2024	Incumbent	

==== House of Representatives ====
Member	Ethnicity	Party	Division	State	Tenure		Notes
Member	Ethnicity	Party	Division	State	Term start	Term end	Notes
Michael Johnson (born 1970)	Chinese (Hong Konger)	Liberal	Ryan	Queensland	10 November 2001	20 May 2010	
Michael Johnson (born 1970)	Chinese (Hong Konger)	Independent	Ryan	Queensland	20 May 2010	21 August 2010	
Ian Goodenough (born 1975)	Singaporean	Liberal/Independent	Moore	Western Australia	7 September 2013	3 May 2025	
Gladys Liu (born 1964)	Chinese (Hong Konger)	Liberal	Chisholm	Victoria	18 May 2019	21 May 2022	First Chinese Australian woman to be elected to the House
Dave Sharma (born 1975)	Indian	Liberal	Wentworth	New South Wales	18 May 2019	21 May 2022	Second Australian ambassador of Indian heritage
Michelle Ananda-Rajah (born 1972)	Sri Lankan	Labor	Higgins	Victoria	21 May 2022	28 March 2025	
Cassandra Fernando (born 1988)	Sri Lankan	Labor	Holt	Victoria	21 May 2022	Incumbent	
Dai Le (born 1968)	Vietnamese	Independent	Fowler	New South Wales	21 May 2022	8 May 2023	First Vietnamese-born member to be elected to Parliament
Dai Le (born 1968)	Vietnamese	Dai Le and Frank Carbone Network	Fowler	New South Wales	8 May 2023	Incumbent	First Vietnamese-born member to be elected to Parliament
Sam Lim (born 1961)	Chinese (Malaysian Chinese)	Labor	Tangney	Western Australia	21 May 2022	Incumbent	
Zaneta Mascarenhas (born 1980)	Indian	Labor	Swan	Western Australia	21 May 2022	Incumbent	
Sally Sitou (born 1982)	Chinese (Laotian Australians)	Labor	Reid	New South Wales	21 May 2022	Incumbent	
Ash Ambihaipahar (born ?)	Sri Lankan	Labor	Barton	New South Wales	3 May 2025	Incumbent	
Julie-Ann Campbell (born ?)	Chinese	Labor	Moreton	Queensland	3 May 2025	Incumbent	
Gabriel Ng (born ?)	Chinese (Singaporean Chinese)	Labor	Menzies	Victoria	3 May 2025	Incumbent	
Leon Rebello (born ?)	Indian	Liberal National	McPherson	Queensland	3 May 2025	Incumbent	
Zhi Soon (born ?)	Chinese (Malaysian Chinese)	Labor	Banks	New South Wales	3 May 2025	Incumbent	

=== State and local government ===
==== Governors ====
Governors	Ethnicity	State	Tenure		Notes
Governors	Ethnicity	State	Term start	Term end	Notes
Hieu Van Le (born 1954)	Vietnamese	South Australia	1 September 2014	31 August 2021	First person of Asian heritage to be appointed a state governor in Australia. First person of Vietnamese background to be appointed to a vice-regal position anywhere in the world.

==== Australian Capital Territory Legislative Assembly ====
Member	Ethnicity	Party	Constituency	Tenure		Notes
Member	Ethnicity	Party	Constituency	Term start	Term end	Notes
Elizabeth Lee (born 1979)	Korean	Liberal	Kurrajong	15 October 2016	Incumbent	First East Asian-Australian to lead a major political party in Australia.
Deepak-Raj Gupta (born 1966)	Indian	Labor	Yerrabi	23 July 2019	17 October 2020	First Indian-born person to hold the position of MLA in the Australian Capital Territory. First MLA to be sworn in on the Bhagwat Gita, representing his Hindu faith.

==== Parliament of New South Wales ====
Member		Ethnicity	Party	Constituency	Tenure		Notes
Member		Ethnicity	Party	Constituency	Term start	Term end	Notes
	Prue Car	Bengali	Labor	Londonderry	8 June 2021	Incumbent	
	Anoulack Chanthivong (born 1977)	Laotian	Labor	Macquarie Fields	28 March 2015	Incumbent	First politician of South-East Asian heritage to take a seat in the NSW Parliament
	Wes Fang (born 1977)	Singaporean	Nationals		9 August 2017	Incumbent	First person of Asian heritage to represent the Nationals in NSW
Sen. Faruqi	Mehreen Faruqi (born 1963)	Pakistani	Greens	Heffron	19 June 2013	14 August 2018	
	Trevor Khan (born 1957)	Punjabi	Nationals		24 March 2007	6 January 2022	
	Geoff Lee (born 1967)	Chinese	Liberal	Parramatta	26 March 2011	25 March 2023	
	Jenny Leong (born 1977)	Chinese	Greens	Newtown	28 March 2015	Incumbent	
	Daniel Mookhey (born 1982)	Punjabi	Labor	Monaro	6 May 2015	Incumbent	
	Helen Sham-Ho (born 1943)	Chinese (Hong Konger)	Liberal / Independent		19 March 1988	28 February 2003	
	Gurmesh Singh	Indian	Nationals	Coffs Harbour	23 March 2019	Incumbent	
	Henry Tsang (born 1942)	Chinese	Labor		27 March 1999	3 December 2009	
	Ernest Wong (born 1960s)	Chinese (Hong Konger)	Labor		24 May 2013	23 March 2019	
	Peter Wong (born 1942)	Chinese	Liberal / Unity Party		27 March 1999	23 March 2007	
	Gladys Berejiklian (born 1970)	Armenian	Liberal		22 March 2003	30 December 2021	

==== Parliament of the Northern Territory ====
Member	Ethnicity	Party	Constituency	Tenure		Notes
Member	Ethnicity	Party	Constituency	Term start	Term end	Notes
Jack Ah Kit (1950–2020)	Chinese	Labor	Arnhem	7 October 1995	16 June 2005	
Ngaree Ah Kit (born 1981)	Chinese	Labor	Karama	27 August 2016	28 October 2024	
Harry Chan (1918–1969)	Chinese		Fannie Bay	December 1962	5 August 1969	
Jinson Charls	Indian	Country Liberal	Sanderson	28 August 2024	Incumbent	
Richard Lim (born 1946)	Malaysian	Country Liberal	Greatorex	1994	2007	
Lauren Moss (born 1987)	Indian	Labor	Casuarina	18 October 2014	28 October 2024	
Sandra Nelson (born 1971)	East Timorese	Labor	Katherine	27 August 2016	30 July 2020	
Khoda Patel	Indian	Country Liberal	Casuarina	28 August 2024	Incumbent	
Tanzil Rahman	Bangladeshi	Country Liberal	Fong Lim	28 August 2024	Incumbent	

==== Parliament of Queensland ====
Member	Ethnicity	Party	Constituency	Tenure		Notes
Member	Ethnicity	Party	Constituency	Term start	Term end	Notes
Michael Choi (born 1959)	Chinese (Hong Konger)	Labor	Capalaba	17 February 2001	23 March 2012	
Anne Warner (born 1945)	Indian	Labor	Kurilpa	22 October 1983	1 November 1986	

==== Parliament of South Australia ====
Member	Ethnicity	Party	Constituency	Tenure		Notes
Member	Ethnicity	Party	Constituency	Term Start	Term End	Notes
Jing Lee (born 1967)	Malaysian Chinese	Liberal	State-wide	20 March 2010	Incumbent	
Rob Lucas (born 1953)	Japanese	Liberal	State-wide	6 November 1982	19 March 2022	
Tung Ngo (born 1972)	Vietnamese	Labor	State-wide	15 March 2014	Incumbent	
Bernice Pfitzner (born 1938)	Singaporean	Liberal	State-wide	23 October 1990	10 October 1997	

==== Parliament of Tasmania ====
Member		Ethnicity	Party	Constituency	Tenure		Notes
Member		Ethnicity	Party	Constituency	Term Start	Term End	Notes
Sen. Singh	Lisa Singh (born 1972)	Indian	Labor	Denison	18 March 2006	13 April 2010	

==== Parliament of Victoria ====
Member	Ethnicity	Party	Constituency	Tenure		Notes
Member	Ethnicity	Party	Constituency	Term Start	Term End	Notes
Tien Kieu (born 1960)	Vietnamese	Labor	South Eastern Metropolitan Region	24 November 2018	26 November 2022	
Hong Lim (born 1950)	Chinese	Labor	Clayton	30 March 1996	29 November 2014	
Hong Lim (born 1950)	Chinese	Labor	Clarinda	29 November 2014	24 November 2018	
Sang Nguyen (born 1960)	Vietnamese	Labor	Melbourne West Province	May 1996	November 2006	
Jude Perera (born 1953)	Sri Lankan	Labor	Cranbourne	25 November 2002	24 November 2018	
Samantha Ratnam (born 1977)	Sri Lankan	Greens	Northern Metropolitan Region	19 October 2017	Incumbent	
Harriet Shing (born 1976)	Chinese	Labor	Eastern Victoria Region	29 November 2014	Incumbent	
Meng Heang Tak	Cambodian	Labor	Clarinda	19 December 2018	Incumbent	
Huong Truong (born 1983)	Vietnamese	Greens	Western Metropolitan Region	21 February 2018	24 November 2018	
Kaushaliya Vaghela	Indian	Labor / Independent / New Democrats	Western Metropolitan Region	24 November 2018	26 November 2022	
Fred Van Buren (1936–2006)	Sri Lankan	Labor	Eumemmerring	1985	1992	
Nicole Werner	Chinese (Malaysian Chinese)	Liberal	Warrandyte	26 August 2023	Incumbent	
Eden Foster	Indian	Labor	Mulgrave	18 November 2023	Incumbent	

==== Parliament of Western Australia ====
Member	Ethnicity	Party	Constituency	Tenure		Notes
Member	Ethnicity	Party	Constituency	Term Start	Term End	Notes
Helen Bullock (born 1965)	Chinese	Labor	Mining and Pastoral Region	22 May 2009	21 May 2013	
Parwinder Kaur (born ?)	Indian	Labor	State-wide	8 March 2025	Incumbent	
Jags Krishnan (born 1972)	Indian	Labor	Riverton	13 March 2021	Incumbent	
Sook Yee Lai (born ?)	Chinese (Malaysian Chinese)	Labor	Bibra Lake	8 March 2025	Incumbent	
Kevin Michel (born 1961)	Indian	Labor	Pilbara	11 March 2017	Incumbent	
Yaz Mubarakai (born 1975)	Indian	Labor	Jandakot	11 March 2017	8 March 2025	
Yaz Mubarakai (born 1975)	Indian	Labor	Oakford	8 March 2025	Incumbent	
Batong Pham (born 1967)	Vietnamese	Labor	East Metropolitan Region	November 2007	May 2009	
Ron Sao (born ?)	Myanmarese	Labor	Cannington	8 March 2025	Incumbent	
Pierre Yang (born 1983)	Chinese	Labor	South Metropolitan Region	22 May 2021	8 March 2025	
Pierre Yang (born 1983)	Chinese	Labor	State-wide	8 March 2025	Incumbent	

==== Councilors and Mayors ====
Member	Ethnicity	Position	Tenure		Notes
Member	Ethnicity	Position	Term Start	Term End	Notes
Harry Chan	Chinese	Mayor of Darwin	1966	1969	
Alec Fong Lim	Chinese	Lord Mayor of Darwin	1 June 1984	9 August 1990	
John So (born 1946)	Hong Konger	Lord Mayor of Melbourne	July 2001	November 2008	First Lord Mayor of Melbourne of Chinese descent.
Katrina Fong Lim (born 1961)	Chinese	Lord Mayor of Darwin	3 April 2012	4 September 2017	
Daniel Lim	Malaysian Chinese	Councillor of City of Melville	25 October 2023		
Anthony Tran (born 1999)	Vietnamese	Maribyrnong City Council	9 November 2021		
Kun Huang (born ?)	Chinese	Cumberland City Council			
Sabrin Farooqui (born ?)	Bangladeshi	Cumberland City Council			
Jasmine Nguyen (born ?)	Vietnamese	Brimbank City Council			
Steven Huang	Taiwanese	Councillor for MacGregor Ward (Brisbane)	2011	Present	

== Sports ==
- Aaron Gurd (born 2001), Australian professional football player
- Adam Hollioake (born 1971), Australian cricket coach
- Alex Silvagni (born 1987), Australian rules football player
- Andrew Embley (born 1981), Australian rules football player
- Andrew Everingham (born 1987), Australian professional rugby football player
- Anne Pang (born 1958), Chinese Australian martial artist and businesswoman
- Ashton Agar (born 1993), Australian cricket player
- Barry Pang (born 1951), Chinese Australian martial artist
- Ben Hollioake (1977–2002), Australian-born England international cricket player
- Catriona Bisset (born 1994), Australian middle-distance runner
- Chen Hsuan-yu (born 1993), Australian badminton player
- Chen Shaoliang), Chinese Australian rules football player
- Clancee Pearce (born 1990), Australian rules football player
- Craig Wing (born 1979), Australian rugby league player
- Daniel Kerr (born 1983), Australian rules football player
- Dannie Seow (born 1967), Australian rules football player
- Eddie Jones (rugby union) (born 1960), Australian rugby union coach
- Emma Guo (born 1995), Australian chess player
- Eric Pearce (field hockey) (born 1931), Indian-born Australian former field hockey player
- Fred Pringle (1899–1982), Australian rules football player
- Geoff Huegill (born 1979), Australian swimmer
- Henry Smith (long jumper) (born 1996), Australian long jumper
- Huang Chia-chi (born 1979), Taiwanese Australian badminton player
- Iain Ramsay (born 1988), Australian football player
- Jason Day (born 1987), Australian golfer
- Joanna Lin (born 2002), Australian rules football player
- Joanne Missingham (born 1994), Australian-born Taiwanese professional Go player
- Jordan McMahon (born 1983), Australian rules football player
- Martin Nguyen (born 1989), Australian mixed martial artist
- Julian Pearce (field hockey) (born 1937), Indian-born Australian former field hockey player
- Kevin Gordon (born 1989), Australian rugby league player
- Lin Jong (born 1993), Australian rules football player
- Michael Letts (born 1985), Australian–Filipino rugby player
- Nick Kyrgios (born 1995), Australian tennis player
- Paul Medhurst (born 1981), Australian rules football player
- Peter Bell (Australian footballer born 1976), Australian rules football player
- Rex Sellers (cricketer) (born 1940), Indian-born Australian cricket player
- Rhys Williams (soccer, born 1988), Australian football player
- Richard Chee Quee (born 1971), Australian former cricket player
- Roger Kerr (footballer) (born 1960), Australian rules football coach
- Sam Kerr (born 1993), Australian football player
- Sean Wroe (born 1985), Australian sprinter
- Stuart Clark (born 1975), Australian cricketer
- Tino Ceberano (born 1941), Australian martial artist
- Trent Dennis-Lane (born 1988), Australian rules football player
- Usman Khawaja (born 1986), Pakistani-born Australian cricket player
- Wally Koochew (1887–1932), Australian rules football player
- William Cheung (born 1940), Hong Kong-born Australian martial artist

== See also ==
- List of Asian Australian politicians
