= Australians in Singapore =

Community in Singapore

Total population
- 20,000 (2012)

Languages
- English (Australian · Singaporean)

Related ethnic groups
- Australian diaspora

Australians in Singapore consists of immigrants from Australia and Singaporean citizens of Australian descent. As of October 2012, there are about 20,000 Australians living in Singapore.

== Migration history ==
Despite a mining boom and a strong economy at home, an increasing number of Australians have left for jobs and promotion opportunities in Asia and elsewhere. Many left for Singapore due to the growth of the country's economy and its population slowing has made it more of a destination. However, many of the Australians who move to Singapore are likely to retain their Australian citizenship and would eventually move to another country or return to Australia.

== Notable people ==
- Patrick Grove – Australian internet and new media entrepreneur.
- Jaymee Ong – Australian model and actress.

== See also ==
- Singaporean Australians
- Australia–Singapore relations
