= Lin Jong =

Australian rules footballer (born 1993)

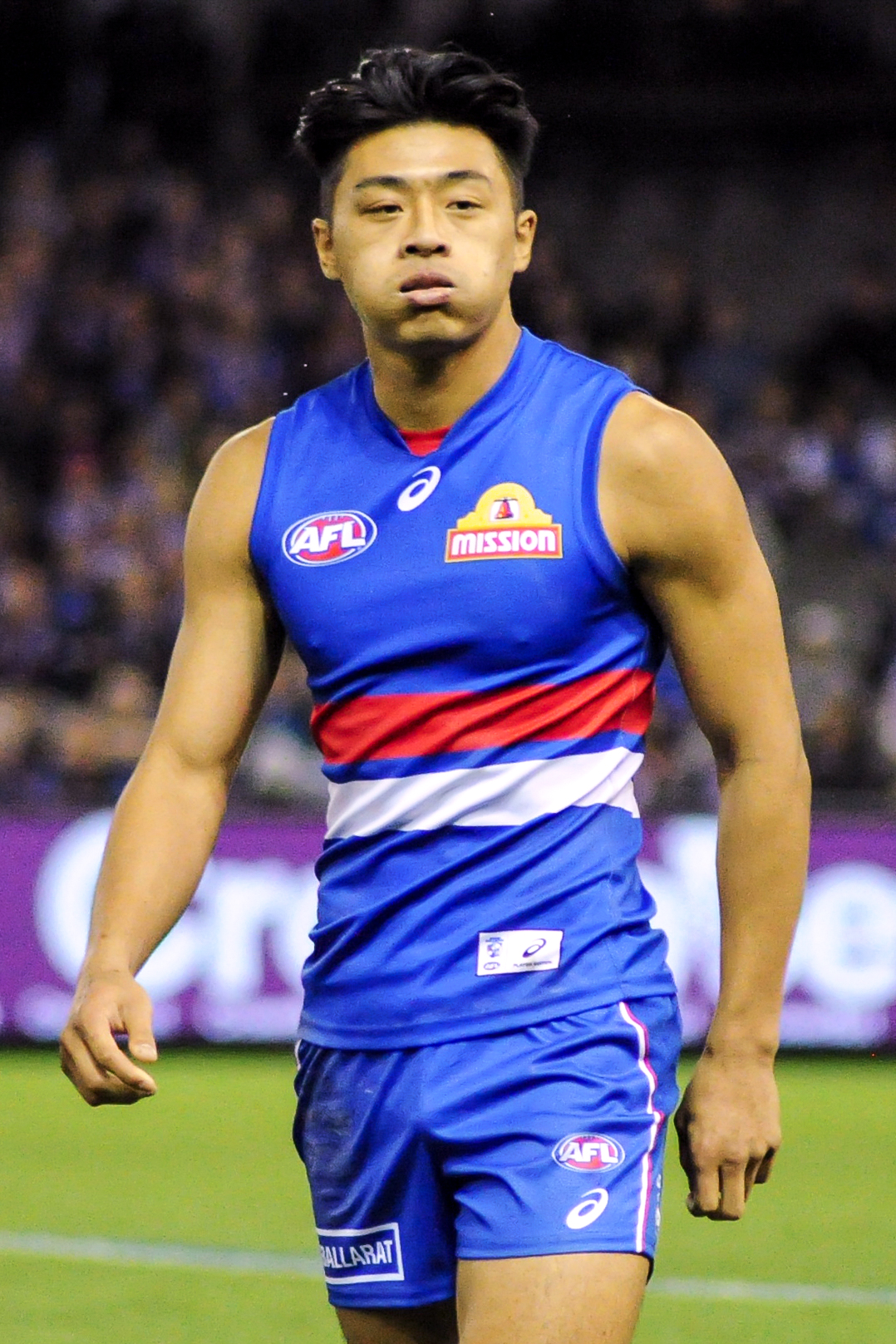
- Lin playing for the Western Bulldogs in April 2018

Personal information
- Full name: Lin Jong
- Born: 4 June 1993 (age 33); Melbourne, Victoria, Australia
- Original team: Oakleigh Chargers (TAC Cup)
- Draft: No. 9, 2012 Rookie Draft
- Height: 188 cm (6 ft 2 in)
- Weight: 88 kg (194 lb)

Playing career^{1}
Years	Club	Games (Goals)
2012–2021	Western Bulldogs	65 (33)
- ^{1} Playing statistics correct to the end of round 6, 2021.

Career highlights
- Footscray VFL Premiership player: 2014, 2016; Norm Goss Memorial Medal: 2016

Lin Jong (Chinese: 楊昇; pinyin: Yáng Shēng; born 4 June 1993) is a former Australian rules footballer who played for the Western Bulldogs in the Australian Football League (AFL). He was recruited by the club in the 2012 Rookie Draft, with pick 9. He was the first Australian of East Timorese and Taiwanese descent to play in the AFL.

== Early years ==
Lin's father, Vitor, an East Timorese of Chinese background, fled his country in 1978 at the age of 18 due to the civil war. He worked and studied in Japan, Macau, Hong Kong, and finally Taiwan, where he met his wife Faye. After marrying, they immigrated to Australia in 1985.

Jong was born in Melbourne, Australia, on 4 June 1993. He attended school at Brentwood Secondary College and played with the Glen Waverley Rovers JFC.

== AFL career ==
Jong made his debut in Round 20, 2012, against Richmond at the Melbourne Cricket Ground.

In 2014, Jong was promoted to the senior list and also signed to a new contract, tying him to the club until the end of 2016.

In 2016, Jong cracked his collarbone in the Western Bulldogs' elimination final victory over West Coast. Despite this injury, Jong earned a Norm Goss Memorial Medal seventeen days later by putting in a best-on-ground effort for his club's reserves team in its victory over the Casey Scorpions in the 2016 VFL Grand Final. In a successful ploy to avoid contact with his injury, Jong took inspiration from Footscray legend Charlie Sutton by taping the opposite shoulder.

On 7 October 2016, after being linked with Collingwood and Gold Coast in preceding weeks, Jong re-signed with the Western Bulldogs on a two-year deal.

After suffering a serious hamstring injury in Round 6 of the 2021 AFL Season, Jong announced his retirement from the AFL on 4 August 2021.

== Post-AFL career ==
At least as early as 2016, Jong had expressed interest in becoming a primary school teacher. In 2017, he had commenced studying to become a primary school teacher, and he had commenced his teaching placement in 2021.
