= Asian Australians =

Australian of Asian ethnicity or ancestry

Total population
- 17.4% of the Australian population (2021 census) (Note: Number of ancestry responses classified within the "North-East Asian", "South-East Asian" and "Southern and Central Asian" groups under the Australian Standard Classification of Cultural and Ethnic Groups as a proportion of the total population. Excludes North African and Middle Eastern Australians who are separately classified. Ancestry figures do not amount to 100 percent as the Australian Bureau of Statistics allows up to two ancestry responses per person.): Chinese Australians: 1,390,637; Indian Australians: 783,958; Filipino Australians: 408,836; Vietnamese Australians: 334,781; Sri Lankan Australians: 153,267; Nepalese Australians: 138,463; Korean Australians: 136,896; Pakistani Australians: 97,593; Thai Australians: 91,942; Indonesian Australians: 87,705; Japanese Australians: 78,049; Malaysian Australians: 61,308; Cambodian Australians: 57,096; Afghan Australians: 54,534

Regions with significant populations
- Sydney, Melbourne, Brisbane, Perth, Adelaide, Gold Coast, Canberra, Hobart and Darwin; Australian towns and regions: Notably Broome, Cairns and the Torres Strait Islands (Note: Broome and the Torres Strait Islands were historically home to thousands of Asian migrants that settled in northern Australia as part of the pearling industry. These Asian migrants were of Japanese, Chinese, Filipino, Malay and Sri Lankan (mostly Sinhalese descent). These migrants integrated into local society by marrying Indigenous Australians (Aboriginal Australians and Torres Strait Islanders), which was very common at the time, and European Australians later on. Today, many long-time residents in Broome and the Torres Strait Islands have partial Asian ancestry tracing back to these early migrants.); External territories of Australia: Christmas Island and Cocos Islands (More than 90 percent of the total populations of the two territories) (Note: The population of Christmas Islanders of full or partial Asian descent consists mainly of Australians of Malaysian descent particularly Malaysian Chinese and Malay descent but also some individuals of Malaysian Indian descent. The majority of inhabitants on the Cocos Islands are the Cocos Malays, who are the indigenous people of Cocos Island. There are also minority populations of ethnic Chinese and Indian descent.)

Languages
- Australian English · Asian languages

Religion
- Buddhism · Christianity · Hinduism · Sikhism · Islam · East Asian religions · Indian religions · other religions

Asian Australians are Australians of Asian ancestry, including naturalised Australians who are immigrants from various regions in Asia and descendants of such immigrants. At the 2021 census, the proportion of the population identifying as Asian amounted to 17.4 percent with breakdowns of 6.5 percent from Southern and Central Asia, 6.4 percent from North-East Asia, and 4.5 percent from South-East Asia.

== Terminology ==
The term Asian Australian was first coined in the 1950s by European Australians who sought to strengthen diplomatic and trade ties with Asia. However, the term was not originally used to describe or recognise the experiences of people of Asian descent living in Australia. It was not until the late 1980s and 1990s that the term was adopted and used by Asian Australians themselves to discuss issues related to racial vilification and discrimination. Today, the term is widely accepted and used to refer to people of Asian descent who are citizens or residents of Australia, although its usage and meaning may vary within the Asian Australian community.

In colloquial speech, the term Asian or Asian Australian often refers to only people of East Asian (including Chinese, Japanese, Korean, and Mongolian) and Southeast Asian (including Filipinos, Cambodians, Vietnamese, Laotians, Indonesians, Thais, and Singaporeans) descent or origin. Though people of South Asian (including Indians, Bangladeshis, Sri Lankans, Nepalese, and Pakistanis) origin may also be included.

=== Census definition ===
Information relating to the racial composition of the population was collected for the first time at the Census of 1911. The following were classified as "Asiatic":

- Chinese
- Hindus
- Japanese
- Syrians
- Malays
- Filipinos
- Javanese
- Cingalese
- Afghans and Baluchis
- Timorese
- Arabs
- Asiatic Turks
- Persians
- Asiatic Jews
- Siamese
- Asiatic (so described)
- Armenians
- Burmese
- Tibetans

At censuses prior to 1966 the instructions relating to race were insufficient to enable respondents to classify themselves according to the degree of racial mixture. As one report for the 1966 Census of Population and Housing details:

For example, from 1933 to 1961 persons were asked the following question:

"For persons of European race, wherever born, write "European ". For non-Europeans state the race to which they belong, for example, "Aboriginal", "Chinese", "Negro", "Afghan", etc. If the person is half-caste with one parent of European race, write also "H.C.", for example "H.C. Aboriginal", "H. C. Chinese", etc."

At the 1966 Census the instructions were re-designed ... in an endeavour to obtain precise data on racial mixture and also to avoid the opprobrium attaching to the term "half-caste" ...

— 1966 Census (1971), "Population: Single Characteristics. Part 11", p. 7

The Australian Bureau of Statistics and Australian Census no longer collect data on race as a standalone category. Instead, they collect information on distinct ancestries, of which census respondents can select up to two. The ABS has classified certain ancestries into categories for the purposes of aggregating data, including:

- North-East Asian (including Chinese, Koreans, Japanese, etc.);
- South-East Asian (including Vietnamese, Filipinos, Indonesians, etc.); and
- Southern and Central Asian (including Indians, Sri Lankans, Afghans, Azerbaijani etc.).

Ancestry is the primary statistical measure of ethnicity or cultural origins in Australia. The different ancestry groups may have distinct histories, cultures, and geographical origins. Therefore, information on Australians with ancestry from Asia can be found in the respective articles for each separate article (e.g., Chinese Australians, Indian Australians, etc.).

Australians of Middle Eastern ancestries are not classified as part of the Asian category under the ABS's Australian Standard Classification of Cultural and Ethnic Groups (ASCCEG). Instead, they are separately classified under North African and Middle Eastern. This includes Australians of Arab, Turkish and Iranian ancestries. However, Armenians, for example, are classified as Central Asian and therefore part of the Asian category.

== History ==
=== Gold rush ===
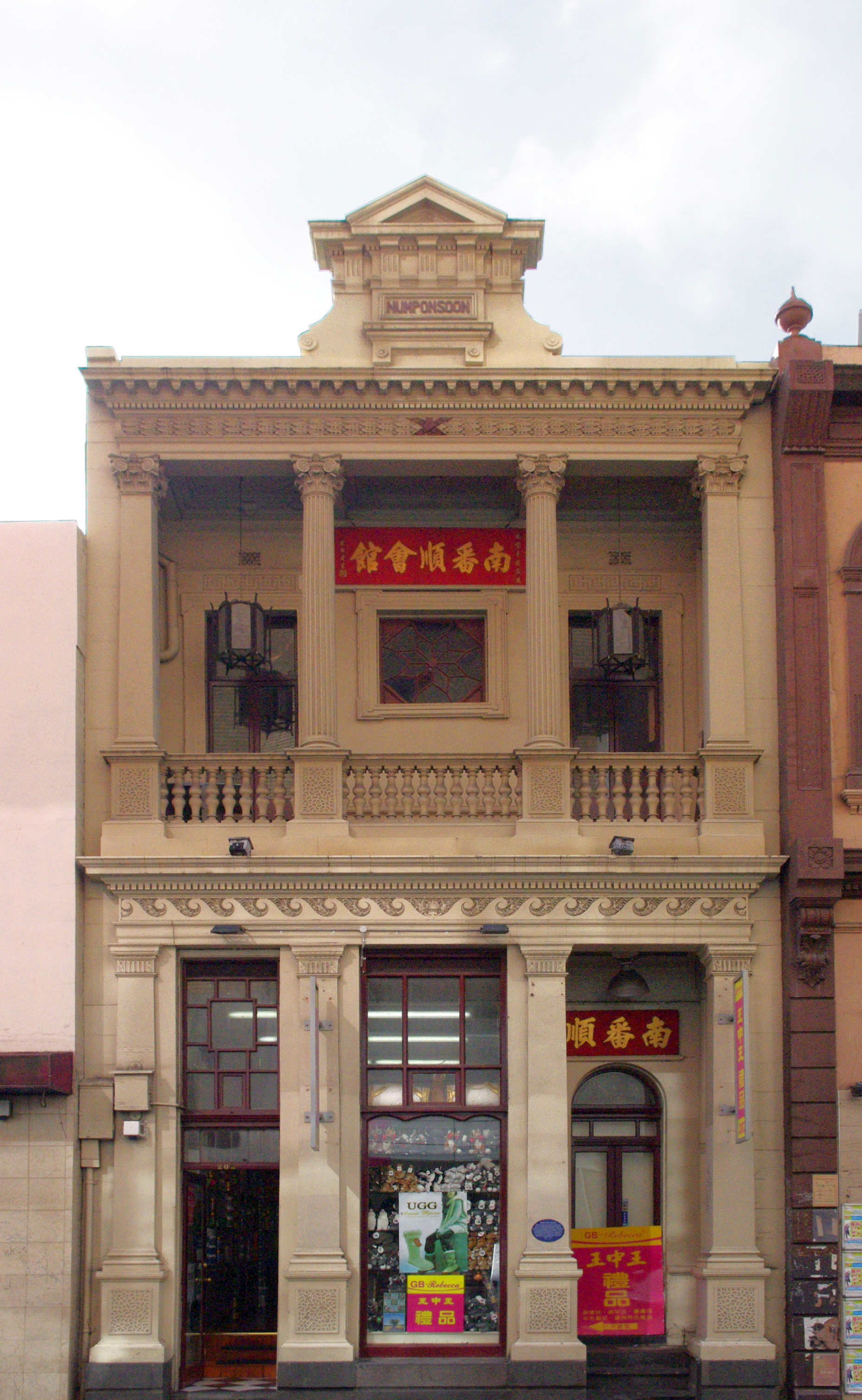
The Num Pon Soon building in Chinatown, Melbourne. Chinatown was founded by Chinese immigrants who came to Victoria during the Victorian Gold Rush. The Num Pon Soon Society was one of a number of district societies and benevolent associations aimed at supporting Chinese immigrants during the Victorian gold rush.

The Victorian gold rush of the 1850s and 1860s witnessed a significant rise in Chinese immigration to Australia. While small numbers of Chinese settlers had arrived as early as 1818, the gold rush triggered a dramatic increase in their presence. However, existing prejudices and cultural misunderstandings led to conflict between Chinese and European communities, culminating in violent riots at Lambing Flat and Buckland. These tensions resulted in the enactment of anti-Chinese legislation by various Australian colonies, foreshadowing the implementation of the discriminatory White Australia policy from 1901 to 1973.

=== Afghan cameleers ===
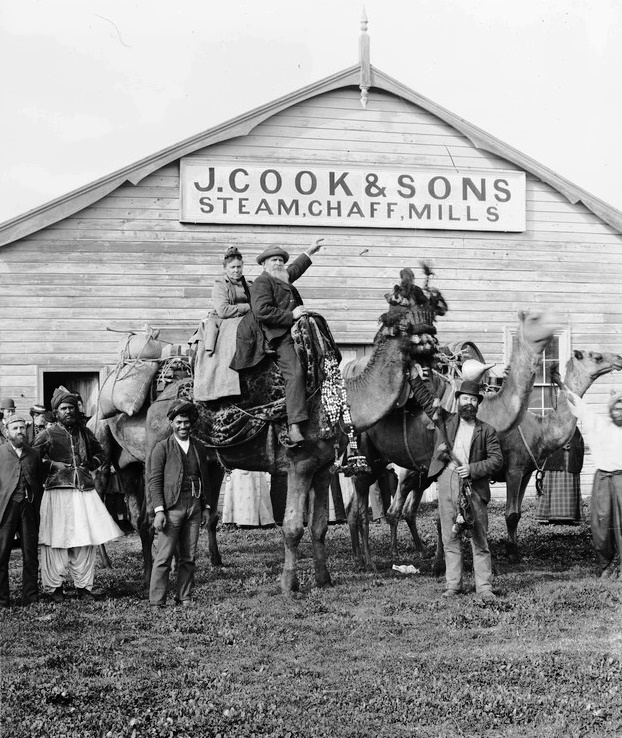
Cameleers with visitors, c.1891

During the period from the 1860s to 1900, small groups of cameleers, mostly from British India but also from other countries including Afghanistan, Egypt, Iran, and Turkey, were shipped in and out of Australia on three-year contracts to service the inland pastoral industry. These workers, who were commonly referred to as "Afghans" or "Ghans", were responsible for carting goods and transporting wool bales by camel train. Most of the cameleers were Muslims, with a sizeable minority being Sikhs from the Punjab region. They established camel-breeding stations and rest house outposts, known as caravanserai, throughout inland Australia, creating a permanent link between the coastal cities and remote cattle and sheep grazing stations. This practice continued until around the 1930s, when the cameleers were largely replaced by automobiles.

=== Immigration restriction ===
'Podgy', a Sikh hawker in Goulburn Valley, Victoria.

During the 1870s and 1880s, the trade union movement in Australia raised concerns about the impact of foreign labour particularly from Asia, on the lives of Australian workers. These concerns, fuelled by anxieties about economic competition and cultural differences, led to calls for restrictions on immigration. While some argued that Asian labourers were essential for development in tropical regions, union pressure ultimately led to the introduction of legislation between 1875 and 1888 aimed at curbing Chinese immigration. These policies, though motivated by a mix of economic and social factors, also contributed to the marginalization and exploitation of non-European workers, including Asian and Chinese immigrants, by limiting their access to better wages and working conditions.

=== Internment during WWII ===
During WWII, Japanese and Taiwanese (the latter due to the fact that Taiwan was then under Japanese colonial rule) from various locations were interned in Tatura and Rushworth, two towns in Victoria, due to government policies. Roughly 600 Taiwanese civilians, including entire families, were held at "Internment Camp No. 4" in Rushworth, between January 1942 and March 1946. Most Japanese and Taiwanese were arrested for racist reasons. Some Japanese and Taiwanese people were born in the camp and received birth certificates. During internment, some adults operated businesses and schools in the camp. Filipinos, Koreans, Manchus, New Caledonians, New Hebrideans, and people from various locations were also held at the camp, as well as mixed-Japanese Aboriginal Australians. Schools mainly taught English, Japanese, Mandarin and Taiwanese languages (Hokkien, Hakka, indigenous Formosan).

=== Repatriation after WWII ===
After the war, internees were resettled in their country of ethnic origin, with the exception of Japanese Australians. Non-Australian Japanese were repatriated to Japan, while Taiwanese were repatriated to Occupied Taiwan. The repatriation caused public outcry due to the poor living conditions on the ship, known as the "Yoizuki Hellship scandal". The government wanted to expel non-citizen Japanese internees, including most Taiwanese. Many believed the Taiwanese should be seen as citizens of the Republic of China (ROC) and hence allies, not expelled under poor conditions. This debate further inflamed outrage at the treatment of Taiwanese internees, and there was a minor controversy regarding the destination of repatriation for some Taiwanese internees. Despite public pressure, the Australian government ultimately still deported the Taiwanese internees.

=== Post-war immigration ===
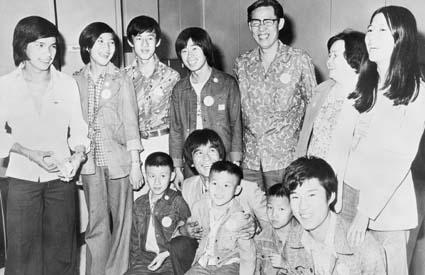
Lao family arriving at Melbourne Airport in 1977

The government began to expand access to citizenship for non-Europeans and increase immigration numbers from non-European countries in the 1950s and 1960s. In 1973, the prime minister implemented a more non-discriminatory immigration policy.

In 1957, the government allowed access to citizenship for 15-year residents. In 1958, the Migration Act was reformed to allow skilled and professional non-Europeans to immigrate and temporarily reside in the country. During the Fraser government, the country experienced the largest intake of Asian immigrants since the 1850s and 1860s due to an increase in Vietnamese refugees after the Vietnam War. In 1983, British immigration was lower than Asian immigration for the first time in Australian history. Overall, immigration policy has evolved towards non-discrimination and broadening pathways to citizenship for Asians, following the dismantling of European-only policies.

== Notable contributions ==
=== Arts, culinary and entertainment ===
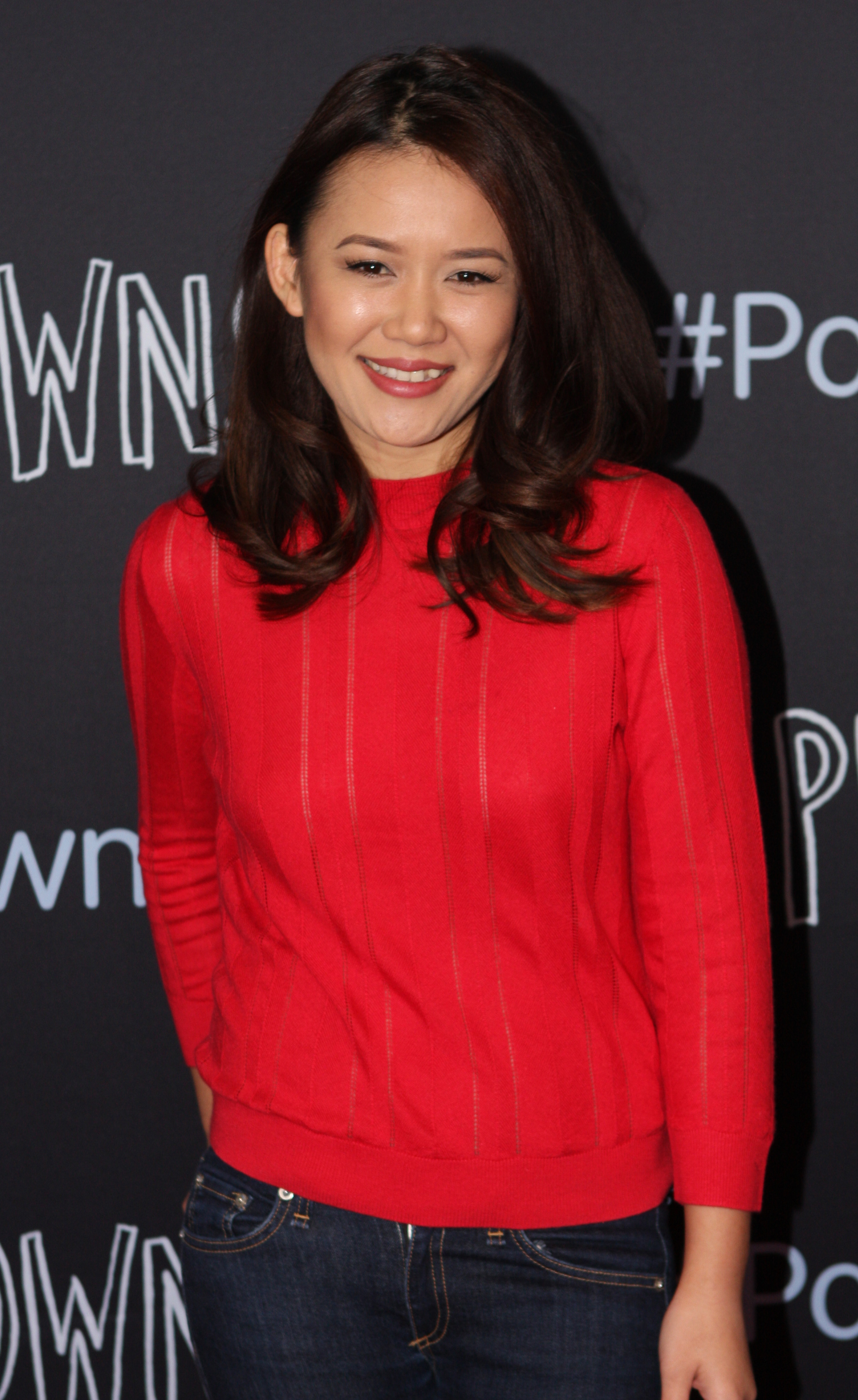
Natalie Tran, Australian YouTuber, actress, and comedian

Asian Australians have been involved in the entertainment industry since the first half of the 19th century. One notable example is comedian Anh Do, who is of Vietnamese descent. Do has gained widespread recognition for his work as an author, actor, comedian, and painter. His 2011 memoir The Happiest Refugee has won multiple awards, including the 2011 Australian Book of the Year, Biography of the Year and Newcomer of the Year, as well as the Indie Book of the Year Award 2011, Non-fiction Indie Book of the Year 2011, and it was shortlisted for the 2011 NSW Premier's Literary Awards, Community Relations Commission Award. Another prominent Asian Australian artist is, Australian singer and songwriter Dami Im. Im rose to fame after winning the fifth season of The X Factor Australia in 2013. On 3 March 2016, it was announced Im would represent Australia at the Eurovision Song Contest 2016. Her song was "Sound of Silence".

Cook and television presenter Poh Ling Yeow, gained national attention as a contestant for the first series of MasterChef Australia. Yeow signed with the Australian Broadcasting Corporation for a cooking series (Poh's Kitchen) and a two-book publishing deal with ABC Books. The production on the series began in November 2009 in her home town of Adelaide. The series was aired from 10 February 2010. Yeow was nominated for the Logie Awards of 2011 in the category of Most Popular New Female Talent. Yeow has appeared in four films: Human Touch (2004), Peaches (2004), Hey, Hey, It's Esther Blueburger (2008) and the Tropfest short film Jackie's Spring Palace (2009). She is also credited as production designer on Jackie's Spring Palace. Aside from her cooking programs, Yeow had substantial roles in Room 101, Can of Worms, Reality Check. She appeared in the 2013 ABC comedy series It's a Date, along with Dave Lawson.

YouTuber, actress, and comedian Natalie Tran, began posting to her YouTube channel in 2006, initially posting responses to other videos she had seen on the site. Her content then consisted of observational comedy skits and vlogs, which lampooned everyday situations, in which she played all of the characters and gave monologues throughout. By 2009, Tran was the most subscribed-to YouTuber in Australia and the 37th most subscribed-to globally. In 2010, she became the 18th most subscribed-to YouTuber globally. She became an ambassador for YouTube's Creators for Change initiative in September 2016. In December 2017, as part of the program, she released White Male Asian Female, a 40-minute documentary about negative perceptions of relationships between Asian women and Caucasian men such as her own, on her YouTube channel. She hosted a video guide segment for the 2019 Sydney Film Festival called the Launch Show, released in May 2019. From 2010 to 2011, Tran worked as a Sydney correspondent for The Project's The Whip segment. The Daily Telegraph called her "one of Australia’s original success stories on YouTube".

Australian author and journalist Benjamin Law, best known for his books The Family Law, a family memoir published in 2010, and the TV series of the same name. The six-part series, loosely adapted from Law's 2010 book of the same name, was written by Law and Marieke Hardy. The program has received critical acclaim from critics. One critic from Daily Review Australia said "the core challenge is making a captivating comedy series about normal people living normal lives. The Family Law gives it a good crack, and has an amiable quality that many viewers will find endearing." Another critic from The Guardian said "there’s so much detail, warmth and gentle humour to the script, direction and production design that the characters and settings are relatable for anyone who grew up – or is growing up – in Australia." She gave the program 4 out of 5 stars. In 2018, Sashi Cheliah was the winner of the tenth series of Masterchef Australia.

=== Journalism ===
Asian Australians have made significant contributions to the field of journalism in Australia, bringing new perspectives and challenging mainstream media narratives. Notable journalists of Asian heritage include Yalda Hakim, a BBC World News presenter who has contributed to SBS's Dateline program, Benjamin Law, an accomplished writer and journalist known for his insightful commentary on Australian society, Lee Lin Chin, a prominent Australian journalist and television presenter, Iskhandar Razak, an award-winning investigative journalist who has worked for the ABC and SBS, and Fauziah Ibrahim, a journalist and presenter for ABC News who has reported on a wide range of stories across Australia and Asia.

=== Sports ===
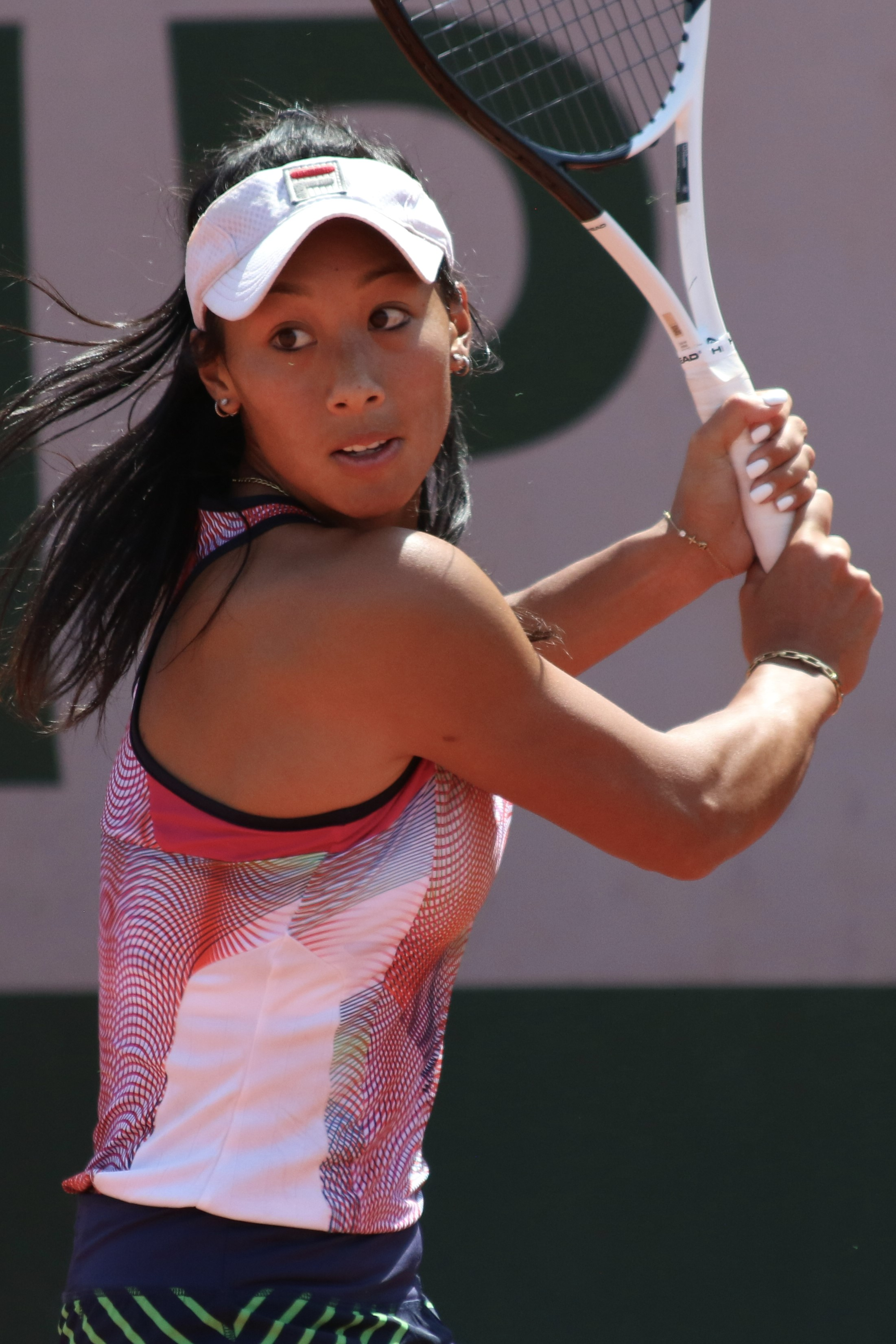
Priscilla Hon, Australian tennis player

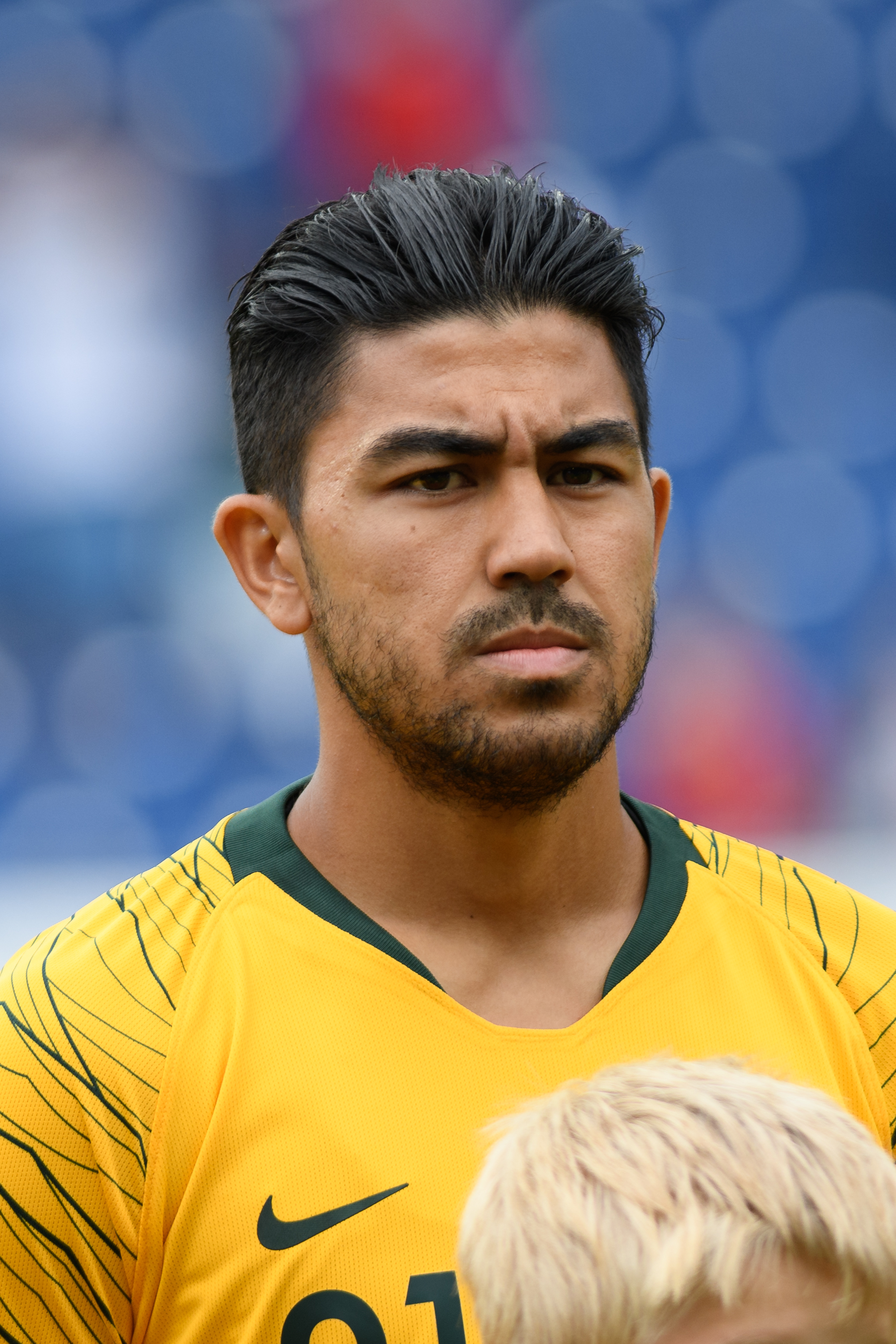
Massimo Luongo, Australian professional soccer player

Asian Australians have contributed to sports in Australia through much of the 20th Century. Some of the most notable contributions include Olympic sports, but also in professional sports, particularly in the post-World War II years. As the Asian Australian population grew in the late 20th century, Asian Australian contributions expanded to more sports. Examples of female Asian Australian athletes include Lisa Sthalekar, Catriona Bisset, Alexandra Huynh, Setyana Mapasa, Priscilla Hon, and Cheltzie Lee. Examples of male Asian Australian athletes include Jason Day, Massimo Luongo, Geoff Huegill, Usman Khawaja, Peter Bell, and Martin Lo.

== Data collection and demographics ==
=== Overview ===
The Australian government collects data on distinct ancestries rather than race at each census, and at the 2021 census, approximately 17.4 percent of the population identified as having Asian ancestry.

At the 2021 census the most commonly nominated Asian ancestries were as set out in the following table. The largest group are Chinese Australians.

Persons nominating Asian Australian Ancestries in 2021
Ancestry	Population
Chinese Australian	1,390,637
Indian Australian	783,958
Filipino Australian	408,836
Vietnamese Australian	334,781
Nepalese Australian	138,463
Korean Australian	136,896
Hong Kong Australian	100,148
Pakistani Australian	97,593
Sri Lankan Australian	95,946
Thai Australian	91,942
Indonesian Australian	85,978
Japanese Australian	78,049
Malaysian Australian	61,308
Cambodian Australian	57,096
Afghan Australian	54,534
Bangladeshi Australian	49,142
Burmese Australian	36,528
Taiwanese Australian	26,345
Armenian Australians	22,520
Laotian Australian	17,287
Karen Australians	13,602
Bhutanese Australians	11,935
Singaporean Australian	11,413
East Timorese Australian	11,105
Chin Australian	8,407
Mongolian Australians	7,808
Hmong Australian	4,035
Tibetan Australians	3,173
Rohingya Australian	2,322
Azerbaijani Australian	1,260
Georgian Australians	1,010
Tatar Australian	972
Total	4,103,409

=== Details ===
Thirty percent of Asian Australians go to university, 20 percent of all Australian doctors are Asian, and 37 percent of Asian Australians participate in some form of organised sport. Chinese and Indian Australians, particularly second and third generation immigrants, are present in large numbers in Sydney and Melbourne, with Chinese Australians constituting Sydney's fourth largest ancestry group.

=== Political representation ===
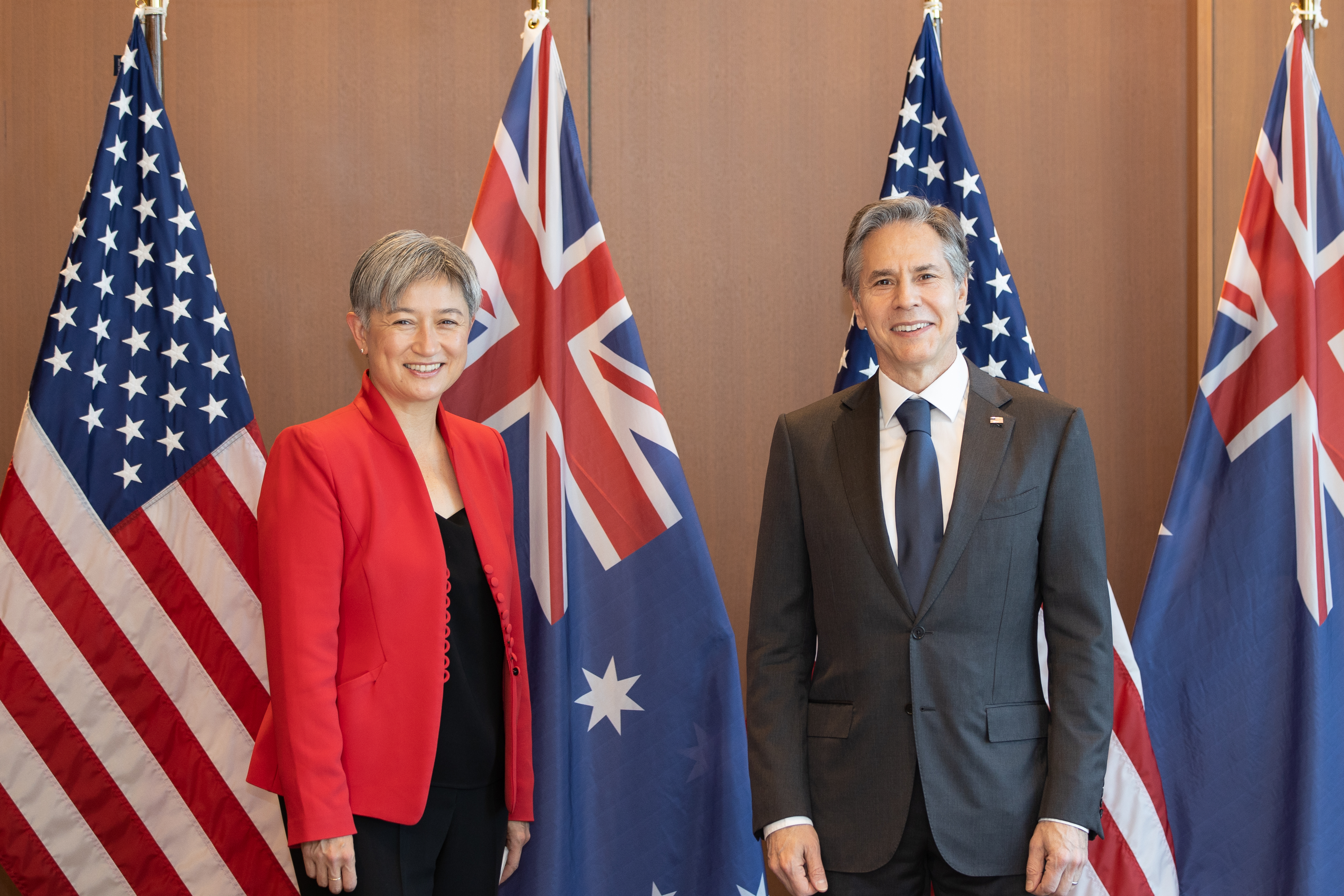
Penny Wong and Antony Blinken at the Quadrilateral Security Dialogue meeting

Members of minority groups make up about 6 percent of the federal Parliament. Both Labor and Greens voters were more likely to agree that Asian Australians experience discrimination, but more than three-quarters of those who said they would vote for the Liberal/National Coalition also agreed.

== Social and political issues ==
=== Discrimination and violence against Asian Australians ===
Asian Australians have faced discrimination and racial violence based on their race and ethnicity. Some Sikh Australians have experienced discrimination due to their religious garments being mistaken for those worn by Arabs or Muslims, particularly after the September 11 attacks.

==== COVID-19 pandemic ====
The COVID-19 pandemic led to an increase in anti-Asian sentiment in Australia.

=== Racial stereotypes ===
There are racial stereotypes that exist towards Asian Australians. Some view Asian Australians as "perpetual foreigners" and not as truly "Australian".

=== Model minority ===
The term "model minority" refers to a minority group whose members are perceived to have achieved a higher level of socio-economic success than the population average. In the case of Asian Australians, this stereotype is often applied to groups such as Chinese Australians, Indian Australians, and Korean Australians. While it is true that some members of these groups have achieved success in education and income, the model minority stereotype is an oversimplification that ignores the diversity and challenges faced by individuals within these groups.

=== Bamboo ceiling ===
The bamboo ceiling is a term used to describe the barriers that prevent Asian Australians from achieving leadership positions in the workplace. Despite making up 9.3 percent of the Australian labour force, Asian Australians are significantly underrepresented in senior executive positions, with only 4.9 percent achieving these roles. This disparity is often attributed to unconscious bias and discrimination within the workplace.

=== Disparities among Asian Australians ===
There are social and economic disparities among Asian Australians. While Asian Australians are over-represented in high-performing schools and university courses, some ethnic groups face challenges. For example, Cambodian Australians have lower rates of educational qualifications and higher participation in semi-skilled and unskilled occupations compared to the general Australian population. Laotian Australians also have lower rates of higher non-school qualifications and higher unemployment rates compared to the total Australian population.

Vietnamese Australians have slightly lower participation in the labour force and higher unemployment rates compared to the national average. Hmong Australians have historically had high unemployment rates and a large proportion in unskilled factory jobs, though in 2010 it had reportedly improved somewhat in recent years. In contrast, Bangladeshi Australians have higher educational levels and a higher participation in skilled managerial, professional, or trade occupations compared to the total Australian population.

== See also ==
- Asian Americans
- Asian Argentines
- Asian Canadians
- Asian Brazilians
- Asian New Zealanders
- Asian Peruvians
- Asian South Africans
- Asian French
- Asian people
- British Asian
- East Asians in the United Kingdom
- African Australians
- American Australians
- Arab Australians
- Black Australians
- Caribbean and West Indian Australians
- European Australians
- Indigenous Australians
- North African and Middle Eastern Australians
