= Sydney University Postgraduate Representative Association =

Student union organization in Australia

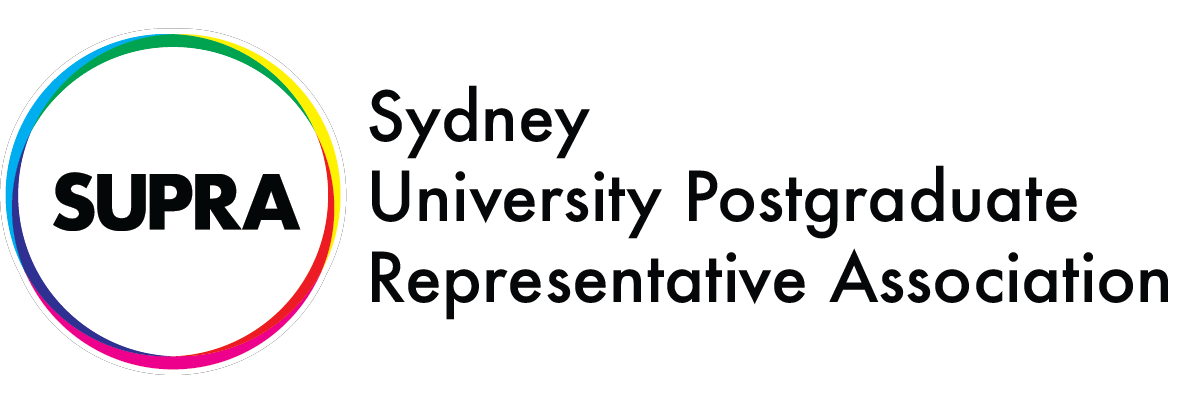
- Motto: Students Working for Students
- Institution: The University of Sydney
- Location: Sydney, NSW, Australia
- Established: 1974
- President: Weihong Liang (since August 2023)
- Members: 26,000
- Website: www.supra.net.au

The Sydney University Postgraduate Representative Association (SUPRA) is the peak body of elected representatives who campaign on behalf of the Research and Coursework Students at The University of Sydney, alongside the University of Sydney Students' Representative Council.

== About the Council ==
SUPRA is governed by a council of democratically elected representatives. It is responsible for all aspects of the governance of SUPRA and carrying out the work of its representation. Council term is held from the 1st day of July to the 30th day of June.

Council meets at least once a month, and considers all the matters of governance relevant to the organisation. Members who are not Councillors are invited to observe and participate in Council, though they will not have any voting rights.

The council is made up of 29 councillors, 23 of whom are elected by the whole populace (with a minimum 12 women, 6 coursework students, 6 research students), and 6 under equity positions – women's, international, indigenous, disabilities, rural & regional, and queer.

== Mission ==
SUPRA is the only organisation related to the University of Sydney in its entire history that has sought to represent all postgraduate students at the university. SUPRA is composed of professional caseworkers and democratically elected representatives who work towards the improvement of student issues and rights within the university and towards society at large.

SUPRA works to achieve this on individual levels by giving independent advocacy and advise, giving assistance to supervisory problems, student appeals, matters relating to coursework, and fees: basically anything that may impact on your academic and general welfare.

SUPRA also works to prevent many of these issues from occurring by consulting with areas of the university's governance and addressing gaps in their policies that adversely affect students. We also work to represent students more broadly, where individual representation might be difficult due to concerns of reprisal, or to ensure that there is an equal playing field against larger institutions. SUPRA provides an independent critical voice, urging the University and Australian governments towards best practices for students.

SUPRA also recognises that part of the support necessary for completing higher education is social. So SUPRA seeks to provide social networks, events and publications to help postgraduate student remain connected to the university and their fellow postgraduate students.

== History ==
Formed in 1970 by Science postgraduates, SUPRA was formally acknowledged by the University of Sydney Senate in 1974 after years of debate. Because most postgraduate students at the time were research students, the Students' Representative Council (SRC) considered them to be junior academics and had thus declined to admit them as members. SUPRA is the only organisation that has ever represented postgraduate students at the University of Sydney.

In 1979, SUPRA became a founding member of the Council of Australian Postgraduate Associations (CAPA), the peak body representing Australian postgraduate students.

Over the years, SUPRA has grown from a small volunteer based organisation to a much bigger one. SUPRA now employs a number of staff to assist elected representatives in the work of representing the interests of postgraduate students at all levels within the university and support individual postgraduates through the course of their study.

During the time of Voluntary Student Unionism (VSU), under the presidency of Jenny Leong, SUPRA secured the funding from the university it required to prosper as an organisation.

== Executive offices ==
SUPRA annually elects an executive team consisting of the president, vice-president, secretary, treasury and education officers. From time to time, these positions may be split between two councillors. As of January 2026, the executive currently consists of:

- Co-Presidents - Yiman Wu & Qiuming Zhang
- Co-Vice-Presidents - Kejun Liu & Anzhe Li
- Education Officer - Weihong Liang
- Co-Secretaries - Yuhan Huang & Abishek Ilangovan
- Co-Treasurers - Jihao Huang & Haolong Liao

There is one other permanent office that does not belong to the executive:

- Co-Directors of Student Publications - Alina Li & Luka Guo

== Equity officers ==
The equity positions have been created to serve the interests of particular groups of the cohort that are generally overlooked. Their aim is to build community, discuss issues and ultimately build capacity to address the issues.

== Notable former members ==
- Brad Buckley - Australian artist, activist, and academic. Known for his contributions to contemporary art and activism.
- Julie Leask - Australian social scientist known for her research in public health and vaccination.
- Mariam Mohammed - Pakistani-Australian activist and survivor. Founder of the Survivors Network. Served as the youngest President of SUPRA in its 40-year history.
