= Australia–Singapore relations =

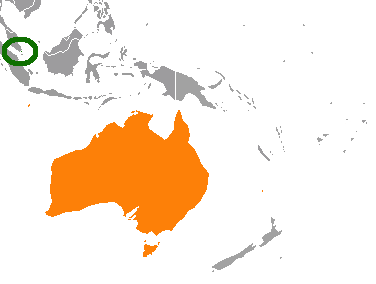

- Singapore: Australia

Australia and Singapore share longstanding and multifaceted relations, elevated by the establishment of the Comprehensive Strategic Partnership (CSP) in 2015. Australia was the first country to establish diplomatic relations with Singapore upon its independence in 1965. Both countries also work closely in international meetings and enjoy warm and cordial relations.

Australia has a High Commission in Tanglin, Singapore, while Singapore has a High Commission in Canberra. The Australian High Commission at 25 Napier Road was built between 1976 and 1977 to a design by prominent Australian firm Godfrey and Spowers. Completed at a cost of AU$4.2 million, the high commission chancery was officially opened by the Minister for Foreign Affairs, Andrew Peacock, on 21 January 1977.

The two nations have an annual meeting between the Prime Ministers, the most recent being the 7th Singapore-Australia Annual Leaders' Meeting in Singapore in June 2023. They also hold biennial high-level talks through the Singapore-Australia Joint Ministerial Committee (SAJMC), the latest being the 13th SAJMC meeting in Canberra, Australia in 2023. Both are active members of several multilateral and regional arrangements, including Asia-Pacific Economic Cooperation, the Commonwealth of Nations, Comprehensive and Progressive Agreement for Trans-Pacific Partnership and the Indian Ocean Rim Association.

== Trade and investment ==
Monthly value of Australian merchandise exports to Singapore (A$ millions) since 1988

Monthly value of Singapore's merchandise exports to Australia (A$ millions) since 1988

The Singapore-Australia Free Trade Agreement (SAFTA) was signed by then-Australian Minister for Trade Mark Vaile and then-Singapore Minister for Trade and Industry George Yeo in Singapore on 17 February 2003, and entered into force on 28 July 2003. The SAFTA is Australia's first bilateral free trade agreement since the 1983 Closer Economic Relations Trade Agreement with New Zealand and one of Singapore's earliest trade agreements. The third and latest review of the SAFTA was completed in 2016. The revised SAFTA entered into force in December 2017.

Trade and investment is sizeable between the two countries. Singapore is Australia's fifth largest trading partner (A$46.8 billion in 2021-22) and fifth largest source of foreign direct investment (A$148 billion in 2022). Singapore is Australia's biggest source of petrol.

=== Optus ===
Singaporean company, Singtel is the owner of major Australian telecommunications company Optus. At the time of purchasing Optus in 2001, the deal was the largest event ever for a Singaporean company valued at approximately A$8.5 billion.

=== Digital Economy Agreement ===
In August 2020, Singapore and Australia signed the Digital Economy Agreement to boost bilateral cooperation in trade facilitation, digital identities, fintech, and e-payments.

=== Green Economy Agreement ===
Minister for Trade and Industry Gan Kim Yong and Australian Minister for Trade and Tourism Don Farrell signed the Singapore-Australia Green Economy Agreement on 18 October 2022, in the presence of Prime Minister Lee Hsien Loong and Australian Prime Minister Anthony Albanese, as part of the 7th Singapore-Australia Leaders’ Meeting in Canberra, Australia.

=== Chamber of Commerce ===
AustCham Singapore is the peak business body representing the interests of Australian business in Singapore.

The origins of the current AustCham go back to the Singapore Australian Business Council (SABC) which was founded in 1977 when a group of Australians with business interests in Singapore met on a regular basis at the Australian High Commission. In 1981, the Singapore Australian Business Council (SABC) was formally registered.

Then on 15 June 2001, SABC changed its name to the "Australian Chamber of Commerce, Singapore" (AustCham Singapore) in order to better reflect the role played by the organisation in the Singapore business community.

The Australian Chamber of Commerce Singapore continues to be a member organisation which fosters, and provides a forum for business links between Australia and Singapore.

=== 2026 Strait of Hormuz crisis ===
During the 2026 Strait of Hormuz crisis, Singapore, as a major energy hub, entered into a supply agreement with Australia to ensure the continued flow of essential fuels. Following the closure of the Strait of Hormuz, hundreds of Australian service stations were left without petrol or diesel, prompting the federal government to seek support from Singapore. Prime Minister Lawrence Wong and Prime Minister Anthony Albanese issued a joint statement affirming a commitment to maintain open energy trade and support the flow of refined petroleum products like diesel and liquefied natural gas. On 10 April, Albanese and Wong signed a bilateral agreement to meet each other's energy needs, with Singapore agreeing to supply refined fuel in return for Australia supplying liquefied natural gas.

== Military cooperation ==
Singapore and Australia enjoy close defence ties, founded on substantive interactions and common perspectives on many issues. The Singapore Armed Forces train in Australia, both unilaterally and bilaterally with the Australian Defence Force. In March 2020, Singapore and Australia signed the Treaty on Military Training and Training Area Development, a key deliverable of the CSP. Building on 30 years of Singapore’s training in Australia, the Treaty underpins the A$2.25 billion investment to jointly develop military training areas, as well as advanced training facilities in Central and North Queensland, which will benefit both armed forces and deepen defence cooperation.

Singapore and Australia have been partners in the Five Power Defence Arrangements since 1971 and are both members of the ASEAN Defence Ministers' Meeting-Plus.

Due to airspace and land constraints, the Republic of Singapore Air Force (RSAF) maintains a number of overseas bases including two in Australia. The RSAF's 130 Squadron is based in RAAF Base Pearce, Western Australia, and its 126 Squadron is based in the Oakey Army Aviation Centre, Queensland.

== Multilateral cooperation ==
The two countries are members of the Commonwealth and each attend the Heads of Government Meeting held every two years to further Commonwealth member's relations. The two countries also work closely at international organisations such as the United Nations, the G20, the World Trade Organization and the ASEAN Regional Forum.

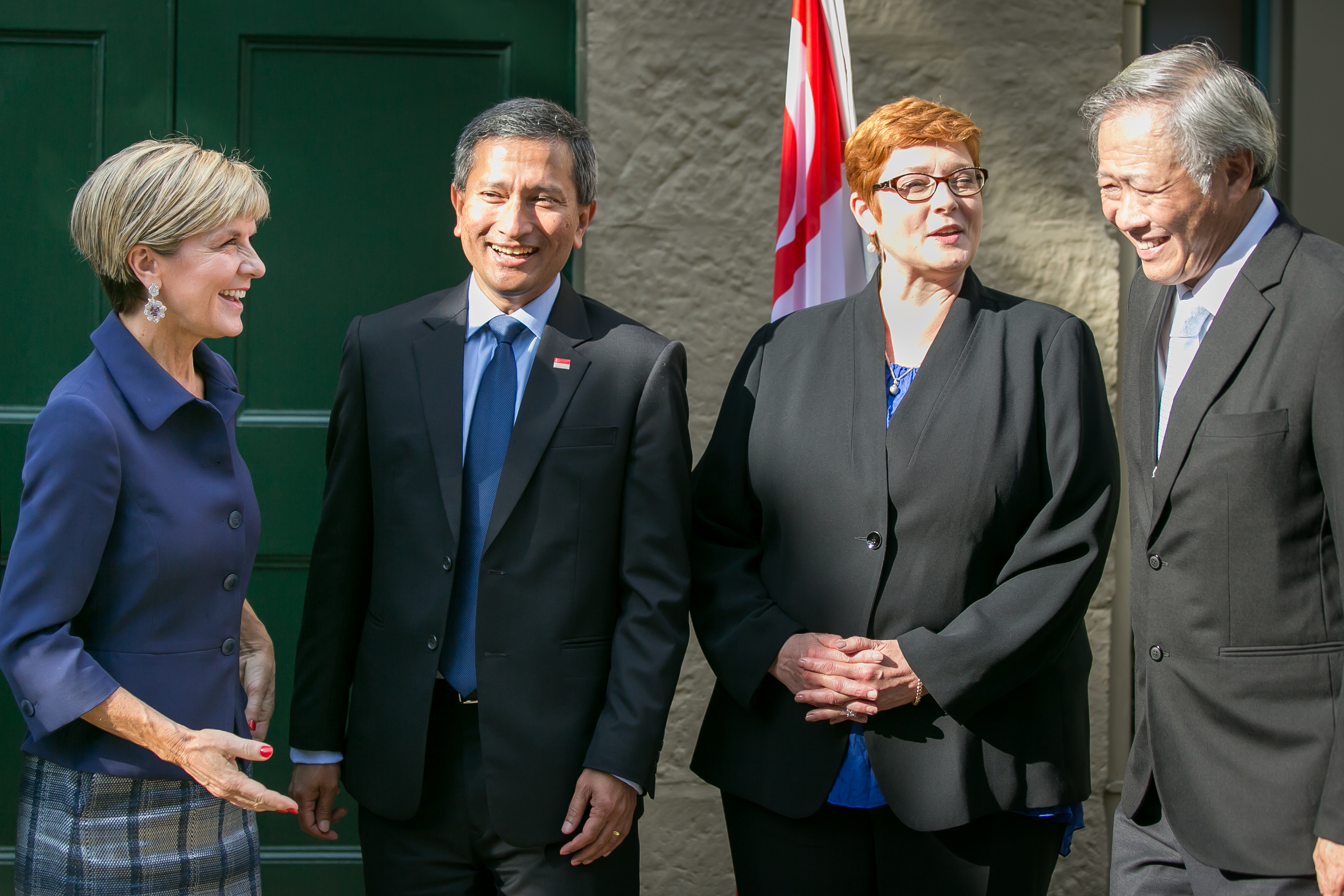
Singapore–Australia Joint Ministerial Committee meeting in Sydney, March 2016.

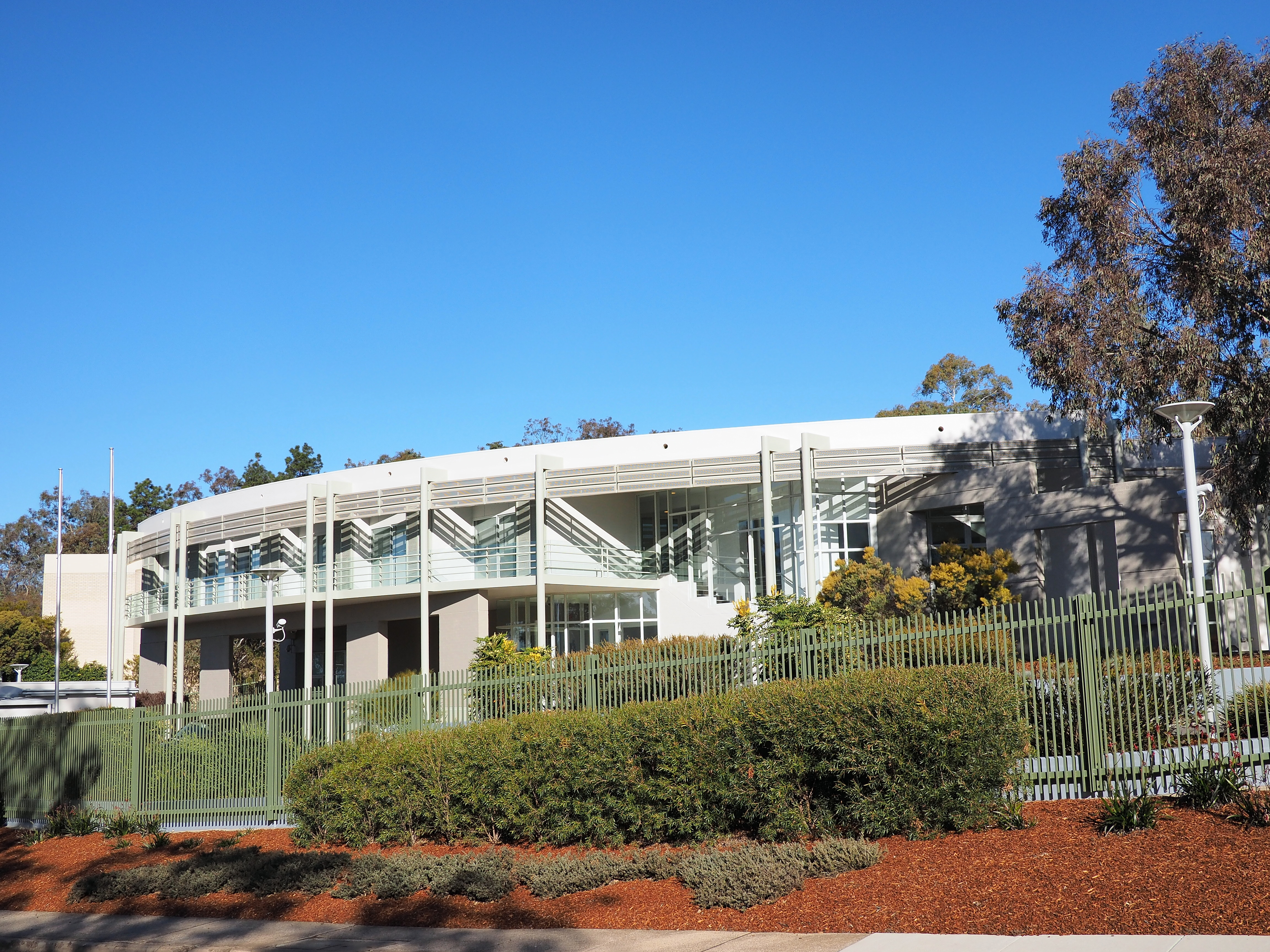
Singaporean High Commission in Canberra

== Opinion polls ==
In a 2025 poll by the Lowy Institute, Singapore ranked as the fourth most favorably viewed country by Australians, with a 72% favorability rating. It ranked behind only the United Kingdom at 75%, Japan at 76% and New Zealand at 85%.

== See also ==
- Singaporean Australian
- Foreign relations of Singapore
- Foreign relations of Australia
