= Tsebin Tchen =

Australian politician (1941–2019)

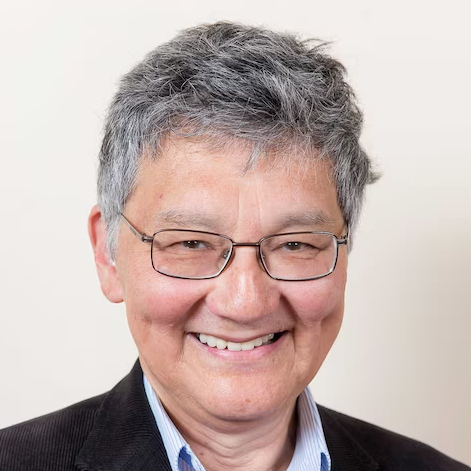

Senator for Victoria
- In office 1 July 1999 – 30 June 2005

Personal details
- Born: 10 March 1941 Chongqing, China
- Died: 25 November 2019 (aged 78) South Australia
- Party: Liberal Party of Australia
- Education: University of Sydney
- Occupation: Town planner

Tsebin Tchen (Chinese: 陈之彬; pinyin: Chén Zhībīn) (10 March 1941 – 25 November 2019) was a Chinese-Australian Liberal member of the Australian Senate from 1999 to 2005, as Senator of Victoria.

== Early life ==
Tchen was born in Chongqing to refugees during WW2. His father was then a junior diplomat with the Chinese Government and was posted overseas when Tchen was two years old. Tchen followed his father to various postings and never returned to China to live, except for two years (1954–56) in Taiwan, where the Nationalist government relocated after Communist takeover. His father continued as diplomat to represent the Republic of China government until 1975 when he retired to live with Tchen in Australia. In 1958, Tchen gained a student visa to Australia to study—at that time, the only way for Asians to enter Australia due to the White Australia Policy. Eventually, he obtained a master's degree in town planning at Sydney University.

== Early career ==
From 1966, Tchen worked as a New South Wales government town planner in Sydney. Harold Holt succeeded Robert Menzies as Australian Prime Minister in 1965 and effectively ended the White Australia Policy by altering the immigration law to allow Asian migration. After weighing up his choices, Tchen decided to remain in Australia, and gained citizenship in 1971.

== Political career ==
In 1972, he joined the Liberal Party of Australia, and became active in Melbourne's Chinese community after moving there to work in 1973. At the 1993 election, Tchen was preselected on the Liberal Senate ticket for Victoria, in the unwinnable fourth position. Despite that, Tchen had made history by being the first Asian-born migrant to be endorsed by either major party in Australian politics at a national election.

Tchen made another run for pre-selection in 1998, at the height of the Pauline Hanson controversy, and was successful. In order to gain preselection, he had to replace a sitting Senator, Karen Synon. She was defeated by Tchen for the third position on the combined Liberal-National Party Senate ticket – a rare event in Australian politics. Synon was relegated to the unwinnable fourth position by a narrow margin of eight votes in a bitter preselection battle. Tchen only succeeded by gaining the support of the then-Premier of Victoria Jeff Kennett who, as well as ringing delegates personally, appointed eight state Members of Parliament as voting delegates to the preselection convention which was enough to secure Tchen's victory. While Kennett's previous interventions in federal politics had been unsuccessful, his opposition to Hanson caused him to break Party rules which mandated the election of delegates. Kennett's preference for Tchen over Synon sparked a major factional dispute within the party, with the Federal Treasurer Peter Costello and Michael Kroger, a former Party President – both sworn Synon supporters – failing to fend off Tchen's challenge.

After the Senate Group Voting ticket issued for the Democratic Labour Party saw it preference the ALP over Tchen, the ALP's third candidate won the fifth Senate spot. In an ironic twist, Tchen was elected on One Nation preferences over the Australian Greens for the final sixth spot and became the second Asian-born migrant to win a seat in either house of the federal parliament after Irina Dunn.

In spite of his rather turbulent introduction, Tchen performed unobtrusively in parliament. He served on a large number of committees but on the floor of the senate, he was rarely heard. He remained a strong advocate of multiculturalism emphasising the need to seek common purposes rather than identifying differences and of demanding acceptance rather than just tolerance. Despite being chair of the government members' policy committee on immigration and multicultural affairs between 2000 and 2004, a position elected by Liberal parliamentarians, Tchen did not significantly influence policy as Australia grappled with the vexing issue of how to deal with asylum seekers and boat people.

In December 2003, Tchen stood for preselection for a second term in the Senate. Despite the claimed support of Prime Minister John Howard, Tchen suffered the same fate as his predecessor and clearly lost to former lower house MP Michael Ronaldson. Unlike Synon who chose to contest the election from fourth spot on the Party ticket in 1998, Tchen declined the offer of the fourth spot and did not stand at the 2004 election. He retired from the Senate when his term expired on 30 June 2005.

Tchen was the third Chinese-Australian elected to federal parliament, following Irina Dunn and Bill O'Chee. He was the second Asian migrant elected to the federal parliament of Australia.

== After politics ==
In his retirement, Tchen again took up his interest in Australian history, especially Chinese Australian History which he believes should be treated as an integral part of Australian History, rather than as a matter of niche interest. He has worked with several notable Australian historians including Judith Brett and John Fitzgerald. He was an adjunct professor with Swinburne University of Technology at the Asia-Pacific Centre for Social Investment and Philanthropy at the Faculty of Business and Law.

In 2015, Tchen was appointed a Commissioner of the Victorian Multicultural Commission by the Labor State Government.

In 2018, Tchen was appointed to the Australian Multicultural Council (AMC), a ministerially appointed body representing a broad cross-section of Australian interests that provides independent and robust advice to Government on multicultural affairs, social cohesion and integration policy and programs.

He continued his voluntary community involvement, and demonstrated extensive links with community organisations, acting as an advisor to a number of Chinese community associations.

Tchen died in a car crash in South Australia on 25 November 2019.

== Personal life ==
Tchen was married to Pauline, a librarian. They have two adult children: Jacinta who is a marketing and cultural strategist and Adrian, a surgeon.
