= Mariam Mohammed =

Pakistani-Australian women's rights activist

- Education: University of Sydney
- Occupations: Entrepreneur, academic, advocate
- Website: mariammohammed.com

Mariam Mohammed is a Pakistani-Australian advocate for gender equity and women's financial literacy.

== Early life and education ==
Mariam was born in Pakistan and later moved to Sydney, New South Wales, to study gender studies at the University of Sydney.

== Work in Gender Equity ==
After serving as gender coordinator for the South Asia Study Group at the University of Sydney, Mariam served as Women’s Officer of the Sydney University Postgraduate Representative Association (SUPRA) and later became its President. She then co-founded MoneyGirl, a financial literacy education platform for women to grant them financial independence.

== Awards and recognition ==
- Australian Financial Review 100 Women of Influence list
- 40 under 40 Most Influential Asian-Australians
- Foundation for Young Australians Young Social Pioneer
- NSW Young Woman of the Year Finalist
- Marie Claire's Next 25 List
- 7News Young Achiever Awards
