= Emma Guo =

Australian chess player (born 1995)

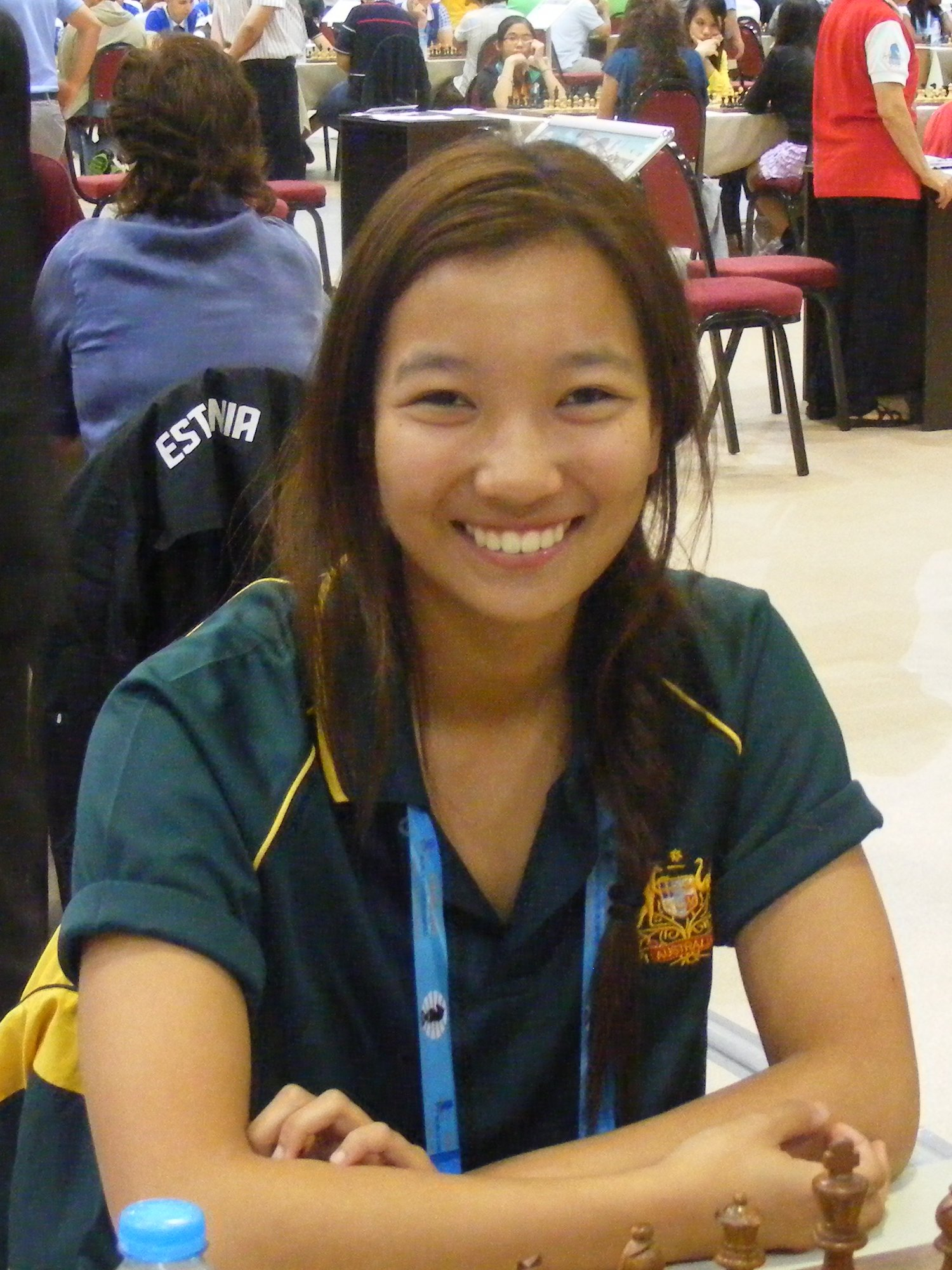
- Emma Guo at the 40th Chess Olympiad in Istanbul, Turkey 2012

Personal information
- Born: 23 February 1995 (age 31) Canberra, Australia

Chess career
- Country: Australia
- Title: Woman International Master (2011)
- Peak rating: 2092 (February 2013)

Emma Guo (born 23 February 1995) is an Australian chess player holding the FIDE title of Woman International Master (WIM). She won the Oceania Women's Chess Championship in 2015.

== Early life ==
Born in Canberra, Guo was taught to play chess by her older brother when she was six years old, and was later coached by local chess player Peter Simpson.

== Chess career ==
Guo is four-time Australian girls' champion: in 2004, 2005 (in the category under-10), 2006 (under-12), and 2007 (under-18).

She was a member of the women's Australian chess team in the 1st World Mind Sports Games held in Beijing, China in October 2008.

Guo has competed in the Oceania Women's Championship four times. In 2009, in the Gold Coast, Queensland, she finished third, behind Arianne Caoili and Irina Berezina, and was awarded the Woman FIDE Master (WFM) title for this result. In 2011, she tied for first place with Berezina in Rotorua, New Zealand, and lost the play-off match held several months later in Parramatta, Sydney. She was awarded the title Woman International Master for this result. Two years later, in Nadi, Fiji, she shared first place with Berezina, and again lost the play-off match. In the 2015 edition, held in Cammeray, Sydney, she finished clear first scoring 7/9 points, and qualified for the knockout Women's World Championship 2016.

Guo played for the Australian national team in the Women's Chess Olympiads of 2010, 2012, 2014 and 2016. She also played for Australia's second team in the 2007 World Youth Under-16 Chess Olympiad.

Guo was the highest scoring female in the 36th Zürich Christmas Open in 2012.

== Personal life ==
Guo obtained a Psychology and Arts degree at the Australian National University in Canberra.

She is of Tibetan descent.

== Notable games ==
Xheladini vs. Guo, Basel 2013

Position: h1 white king, f1 white queen, h2 white knight, g2 white pawn, e2 white rook, h3 white pawn, c3 white pawn, f4 black knight, e4 white pawn, a4 white pawn, e5 black pawn, b5 white pawn, a5 black pawn, g6 black queen, d6 black pawn, b6 black bishop, h7 black pawn, c7 black pawn, b7 black pawn, h8 black king, g8 black rook

Final position
- Mahmut Xheladini vs Emma Guo, Hilton Master Open, Basel (2013), Ruy Lopez: Schliemann Defence, (C63), 0-1

1.e4 e5 2.Nf3 Nc6 3.Bb5 f5 4.d3 fxe4 5.dxe4 Nf6 6.Bg5 Bc5 7.O-O d6 8.c3 O-O 9.Nbd2 Qe8 10.Bh4 Kh8 11.b4 Bb6 12.Re1 Nh5 13.Bf1 Bg4 14.Qb3 Qg6 15.Kh1 Rf4 16.Bg3 Nxg3+ 17.fxg3 Rf6 18.Be2 Bxf3 19.Bxf3 Qxg3 20.Re2 Rh6 21.Nf1 Qf4 22.a4 a5 23.b5 Ne7 24.Rd1 g5 25.Rd3 g4 26.Re1 gxf3 27.Rxf3 Qg4 28.h3 Rg8 29.Qc2 Qh4 30.Qb1 Rf6 31.Rxf6 Qxf6 32.Re2 Ng6 33.Nh2 Nf4 34.Qf1 Qg6 0-1
