= Malaysian Australians =

Total population
- 281,940 (2025)

Regions with significant populations
- Melbourne, Sydney, Perth, Adelaide, Brisbane

Languages
- Australian English, Malaysian English, Chinese (Cantonese, Min Chinese, Malaysian Mandarin), Tamil, Malay, other Languages of Malaysia, Orang Asal languages

Religion
- Predominantly Unaffiliated and Christianity, with minorities of Buddhism, Islam and Hinduism

Related ethnic groups
- Various ethnic groups of Malaysia, Singaporean Australians, Cocos Malays, Chinese Australians, and Indian Australians

Malaysian Australians (Malay: orang Malaysia Australia) refers to Malaysians who have migrated to Australia or Australian-born citizens who are of Malaysian descent. This may include Malaysian Chinese, Malays, Malaysian Indians, Orang Asal, mixed Malaysians and other groups.

== History ==
Malay labourers were brought over to Australia to work mainly in the copra, sugarcane, pearl diving and trepang industries. In the case of Cocos Islands, the Malays were first brought as slaves under Alexander Hare in 1826, but were then employed as coconut harvesters for copra. Possibly the first Malay immigrant to Australia was a 22-year-old convict named Ajoup who arrived in Sydney on 11 January 1837. Ajoup, described as 'of the Malay faith', had been sentenced in Cape Town, South Africa, to 14 years transportation to New South Wales. He received his ticket of leave—that is, his freedom—in the colony in 1843.

The 1871 colonial census records that 149 Malays were working in Australia as pearl divers in northern and western Australia, labourers in South Australia's mines, and on Queensland's sugar plantations. At Federation in 1901, there were 932 Malay pearl divers in Australia, increasing to 1860 by 1921. In Western Australia and the Northern Territory, Malay pearl divers were recruited through an agreement with the Dutch. By 1875, there were 1800 Malay pearl divers working in Western Australia alone. Most of them returned home when their contracts expired. The Immigration Restriction Act 1901 severely curtailed this community's growth.

Number of permanent settlers arriving in Australia from Malaysia since 1991 (monthly)

== Demography ==
People born in Malaysia as a percentage of the population in Sydney divided geographically by postal area, as of the 2011 census.

At the 2006 Census 92,335 Australian residents stated that they were born in Malaysia. 64,855 Malaysian born Australian residents declared having Chinese ancestry (either alone or with another ancestry), 12,057 declared a Malay ancestry and 5,848 declared an Indian ancestry. The proportion of Malaysian-born individuals in Australia who claim Chinese ancestry is 70.2%, which is markedly different from the proportion of Malaysians in Malaysia who claim Chinese ancestry (22.9%). The proportion of Malaysians in Australia that claim Indian ancestry (6.3%) is similar to the proportion in Malaysia (7.1%). From these statistics, it is clear that migration from Malaysia to Australia has not reflected a cross-section of Malaysia, but rather, is heavily skewed away from the Malay natives and towards the ethnic Chinese community and to a lesser extent the ethnic Indian community.

=== Religion ===
Though Islam is the major religion in Malaysia, Islam is the minority religion among Malaysians in Australia. In 2016, 11,633 people from 165,616 Malaysian Australians, or 7% of the Malaysian Australian population, identified as Muslim, up from 7,610 Muslims or 5.2% in 2016.

According to the data from Australian Bureau Statistics in 2016, 24.1% from Malaysian Australians population identifying as Buddhists, 20.9% as No religion, 12.7% as Catholic, 5.6% as Other Christian and 5.2% as Muslim.

According to Australian Bureau Statistics in 2021, 24.1% from Malaysian Australian population identifying as No religion, 23.8% as Buddhists, 11.8% as Catholic, 7.0% as Muslim and 5.9% as Other Christians.

Religion of Malaysian Australians (2021)
1. Christianity (35.8%)
2. No religion (26.6%)
3. Buddhism (23.8%)
4. Islam (7.00%)
5. Others (6.90%)

=== Languages ===
Slightly more than half (46,445) had Australian citizenship, and 47,521 had arrived in Australia in 1989 or earlier. 32,325 spoke English at home, 24,347 spoke Cantonese, 18,676 spoke Mandarin and 5,329 spoke Malay. Malaysian Australians were resident in Melbourne (29,174), Sydney (21,211) and Perth (18,993).

== Notable Malaysian Australians ==
| Name | Born – Died | Notable for | Connection with Australia | Connection with Malaysia |
|---|---|---|---|---|
| Nishan Velupillay | 2001– | Footballer | Born in Australia, represents Australia in international football | Father is Malaysian with Sri Lankan heritage |
| Che'Nelle | 1983– | singer | lives in Australia | born Kota Kinabalu |
| Eddie Woo | 1985– | mathematics teacher | born in Camperdown, New South Wales | Parents migrated from Malaysia |
| Dr Yvonne Ho AM | | public speaker, businesswoman, educator, medical specialist, philanthropist | first Malaysian-born woman to receive Order of Australia award | born in Malaysia |
| Chandran Kukathas | 1957– | political theorist, professor and head of Department of Government, London School of Economics | studied and taught in Australia from 1970s to 2000s | born in Malaysia |
| Diana Chan | 1988– | MasterChef Australia winner | Living in Australia | born in Malaysia |
| Remy Hii | 1986/87– | actor | lives in Australia | of Malaysian descent |
| Nick Kyrgios | 1995– | Professional tennis player | born in Canberra | mother is Malaysian |
| Kamahl | 1934– | singer | lives in Australia; immigrated 1953 | born Kuala Lumpur |
| Brendan Gan | 1988– | football (soccer) player | lives in Australia | of Malaysian descent |
| Matthew Davies | 1995– | football (soccer) player | born in Perth, lives in Australia | of Malaysian descent |
| Adam Liaw | 1978– | lawyer, author and television chef | lives in Australia; immigrated 1980 | born in Penang |
| Cheong Liew | | chef | lives in Australia; immigrated 1969 | born Kuala Lumpur |
| Chong Lim | | musician, music director | lives in Australia | born Ipoh |
| Omar Musa | 1984– | author, poet and rapper | born in Queanbeyan | Father is from Malaysia |
| Guy Sebastian | 1981– | singer | lives in Australia; immigrated as child | born Klang |
| Pria Viswalingam | 1962– | documentary and film maker | works in Australia | born Malaysia |
| James Wan | 1977– | film director, screenwriter and producer | brought up in Australia and studied there | born Kuching |
| Penny Wong | 1968– | politician, leader of the Australian Labor Party in the Senate, former Finance Minister | lives in Australia; Australian mother; immigrated 1977 | born Kota Kinabalu, Chinese Malaysian father |
| Poh Ling Yeow | 1973– | artist and television chef | moved to Adelaide in 1982 | born and raised in Kuala Lumpur |
| Geraldine Viswanathan | 1995– | Actress | Born in Australia | Father is Malaysian |
| Vivien Tan | ?– | former model, 1-time actress in British-Australian TV series The Other Side of Paradise, former Channel [V] VJ, and present TV host, chef and entrepreneur | Australian mother, lived in Australia to study | Malaysian father |
| Lina Teoh | 1976– | model, actress, TV host, former Channel [V] VJ, and former beauty queen (Miss World 1998) | born and grew up in Melbourne | Chinese Malaysian father |
| Ian Goodenough | 1975– | politician, member of Liberal Party of Australia | migrated to Australia as a child in 1984, naturalized Australian citizen in 1987 | partial Chinese Malaysian descent |
| Sam Lim | 1961– | politician, member of the Australian Labor Party | migrated to Australia in 2005 | born in Muar |
| Christopher Chung (actor) | 1988 | Actor | born and raised to a Malaysian Chinese father and Irish mother | Father is Malaysian Chinese |
| Sean Lee | 1995 - | Doctor and Artist. Winner of inaugural Eckersley’s Art & Craft Prize 2025 | New South Wales Based Malaysian Chinese Heritage | Malaysian Chinese Heritage |
| Siang Lu | | Author and Winner of Miles Franklin Literary Award for novel: "Ghost Cities" 2025 | Brisbane Based Malaysian Chinese Heritage | Malaysian Chinese |
| Khai Liew | 1952 - 2023 | Was an award winning South Australian Furniture designer / artist. | South Australian Malaysian Chinese Heritage | Malaysian Chinese |

== See also ==
- Islam in Australia
- Asian Australians
- Cocos Malays
- Australia–Malaysia relations
- Malaysian New Zealanders
