= East Timorese Australians =

Total population
- 9,225 (by birth, 2011); 7,085 (by ancestry, 2011)

Languages
- Hakka Chinese · English · Tetun · Portuguese · Indonesian ·

Religion
- Christianity (mainly Roman Catholicism)

East Timorese Australians are Australian citizens of East Timorese descent or an East Timor-born person who resides in the Commonwealth of Australia.

East Timorese people in Australia are one of the largest groups of the East Timorese diaspora. They mainly speak Hakka Chinese, Tetun, Portuguese and other local languages.

== Migration history ==
=== Under Portuguese rule ===
East Timorese immigration to Australia began with the arrival of the first migrants from the then Portuguese Timor in 1943 during World War II. This migration wave consisted of approximately 600 people who were evacuated from the island, of whom only 35 settled permanently after the war ended.

=== Indonesian occupation ===
During the Indonesian invasion of 1975, a significant number of East Timorese fled to Darwin, situated 656 km (408 mi) from Dili. The Australian government accepted 2,500 East Timorese refugees in 1975, primarily those of Portuguese descent. Fretilin was reported to have been active in Darwin during this time using high frequency (HF) radio communication to contact comrades in Dili. Darwin proved an ideal base for Fretilin to operate its informal government in exile given the city's significant East Timorese exile community who supported independence.

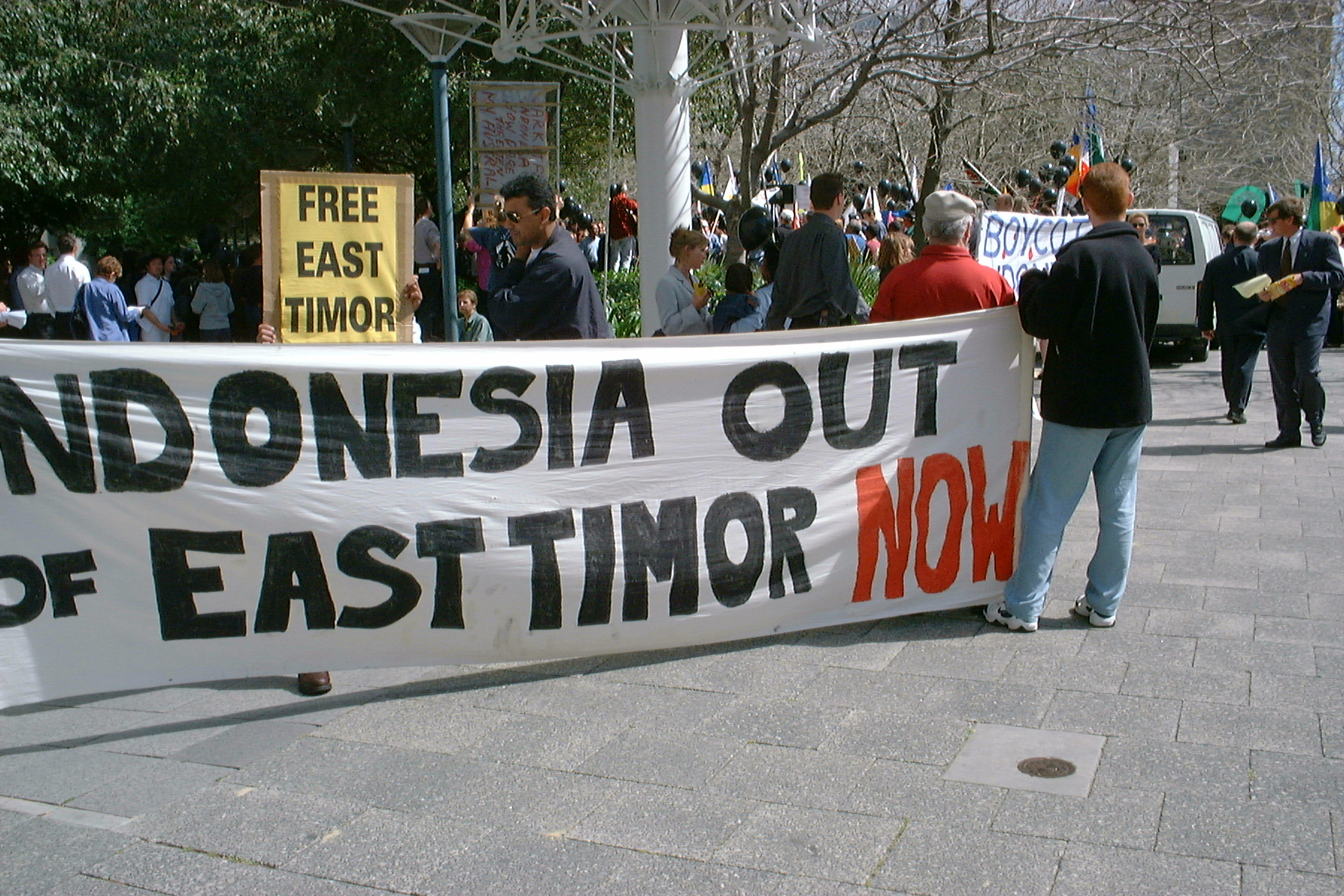
A demonstration for independence from Indonesia held in Australia during September 1999.

== See also ==
- Immigration to Australia
- Asian Australians
- Australia–East Timor relations
