= Hong Kong Australians =

香港裔澳洲人 (Chinese)

Total population
- 100,148 (by birth, 2021 census) (excluding descendants who were born in Australia, and first-generation immigrants who were born elsewhere)

Regions with significant populations
- New South Wales; Victoria; Queensland

Languages
- Cantonese, English, Standard Mandarin

Religion
- Buddhist, Taoist, Confucian or Non-religious; Roman Catholic, Protestant, etc.

Related ethnic groups
- Hongkongers, Chinese Australians

Hong Kong Australians are Australian citizens or permanent residents of Hong Kong descent. Many Hong Kong Australians hold dual citizenship of Australia and China.

== Description ==
The predominant language among Hongkongers is Cantonese, a variety of Chinese originating in Guangdong. It is spoken by 93.7% of the population Slightly over half the population (58.7%) speaks English, the other official language; 4.6% are native speakers, and 54.1% speak English as a second language. Code-switching, mixing English and Cantonese in informal conversation, is common among the bilingual population. Post-handover governments have promoted Mandarin, which is currently about as prevalent as English; 54.2% of the population speak Mandarin, with 2.3% native speakers, and 51.9% as a second language.

Hong Kong permanent residents can come from a variety of ethnicities. The overwhelming majority (91.6%) is Han Chinese, most of whom are Taishanese, Teochew, Hakka, and other Cantonese peoples.

== History ==
People born in Hong Kong as a percentage of the population in Sydney divided geographically by postal area, as of the 2011 census.

According to the 2021 Australian census, 100,148 Australians were born in Hong Kong; a figure that would exclude first-generation immigrants from Hong Kong who were born elsewhere (mainly Guangdong), as well as descendants of immigrants who were born in Australia. The corresponding figure on ancestry was not collected.

== Notable Hong Kong Australians ==
- Benjamin Law – writer and journalist
- Clara Law – film director (born in Macau)
- John So, AO, JP – 102nd Lord Mayor of Melbourne
- Raymond Chan – basketballer
- Lindy Hou, OAM – Paralympic Games and World Champion Tandem Cyclist
- Kenneth To – swimmer
- Gladys Liu – Liberal Member for Chisholm
- Curtis Cheng – victim of islamic terrorist attack during the 2015 Parramatta shooting
- Jared Lum – footballer
- Sam Chui – Aviation blogger
- Brad Turvey – former model and TV host in the Philippines (born in Hong Kong to a Hong Kong Chinese mother)
- Jessica Gomes – model (born in Singapore to Hong Kong Chinese mother)
- Stephanie Jacobsen – actress & TV host (born in Hong Kong)
- Anjali Rao – journalist & TV news program host (born in Hong Kong)

== See also ==
- Chinese Australians
- Taiwanese Australians
- Australians in Hong Kong
- Hong Kong Economic and Trade Office, Sydney
