= Singaporean Australians =

Total population
- 61,056 (2021)

Regions with significant populations
- Perth, Melbourne, Sydney, Brisbane, Adelaide

Languages
- English; Malay; Mandarin; Tamil

Religion
- 2016 census 24.8% No religion 19.1% Catholic; 9.0% Buddhism; 6.8% Muslim; 6.4% Protestant

Related ethnic groups
- Singaporeans; Overseas Singaporean; Christmas Islanders; Cocos Malays

Singaporean Australians are Australians of Singaporean descent. As Singapore is a multi-racial country, a Singaporean Australian could either be of Chinese, Malay or Indian descent, the main races of Singapore. According to the 2006 Australian census, 39,969 Australians were born in Singapore while 4,626 claimed Singaporean ancestry, either alone or with another ancestry.

In 2019, the United Nations Department of Economic and Social Affairs statistics showed the Singaporean community in Australia had a population of 64,739, with the number including both Australians of Singapore origin and Singaporeans residing in Australia. It is the 2nd largest community of overseas Singaporeans.

Most Singaporeans in Australia consists of expatriate professionals, working holidays graduates, as well as skilled workers, with many still maintaining close ties with Singapore.

== History ==
The number of permanent settlers arriving in Australia from Singapore since 1991 (monthly)

=== Early years ===
Singaporean migration began prior to Singapore's independence as a sovereign country in 1965, during Australia's gold rush period (1851–1914). At the time, Singapore was a British colony, and so was Australia. Therefore, movements within the former British Empire's territories in the then known "Far East" were relatively common.

However, Asian immigration to Australia at the time was generally restricted due to the White Australia policy, and so most immigration at this time were people of European or half-European descent (Eurasian), especially British.

=== 20th century ===
==== Island transfers ====
In 1955 and 1958 respectively, the territories of Christmas Island and the Cocos (Keeling) Islands were transferred from Singapore to Australia. As a result, its inhabitants went from conventional Singaporeans to one that is considered to be Singaporean Australians. In the lead up to the transfer, there were some opposition by several legislative members in Singapore who felt that they weren't properly consulted on the matter.

Then Chief Minister of Singapore, Lim Yew Hock, also raised concerns with regards to the citizenship and employment of the islanders. However, the British, who at the time had still managed Singapore's foreign affairs until 1963, still eventually transferred the island over to Australia after claiming that it had addressed certain of the issues.

==== Students ====
In the 1960s, as the Australian government began to loosen policies on immigration after the end of the White Australia policy; Australia became a popular choice for Singaporean students to study due to its relatively close distance.

In the late 1980s, it was recorded that 16,400 Australians were of Singaporean origin and it was also during this period of time that Australian universities began having sizeable communities of Singaporean students, recording 1,266 students being enrolled.

In 1995, the United Nations Department of Economic and Social Affairs reported that there were 29,812 people within the Singaporean Australian community, with students accounting for about 40% of population, as the Australian Census of 1996 recorded about 11,000 students from Singapore enrolled in universities in the country. By 1998, the population was estimated to have grown to 35,933 people. With the increase in the population of Singaporeans in Australia, a number of Singaporean clubs and associations were set up to support the communities located across the country.

=== 21st century ===
From 2005 to 2010, the population of the community had greatly increased from 43,070 to 53,550 and it was during this period that the Singapore government had set up an Overseas Singaporean unit to engage overseas communities of Singaporeans as the number of Singaporeans living aboard increased. Singaporean associations and clubs were also allowed to apply for funding through the unit to organise events during important festivals such as Chinese New Year, Hari Raya Puasa, Deepavali, Vesak Day, Christmas, Good Friday and New Year's Day which are celebrated by the different major racial and religious groups back in Singapore.

Factors for Singaporeans in Australia remained the same, with a majority of them there for education. Since 2022, the number of Singaporeans that have moved to Australia has increased, with the rise partially attributed to COVID-19 restrictions that may have slowed applications prior.

== Demographics ==
People born in Singapore as a percentage of the population in Sydney divided geographically by postal area, as of the 2011 census

In 1996, most of the Singaporean communities were concentrated in Western Australia, New South Wales, Sydney and Victoria. The state of Victoria had a sizeable community of Singaporeans or Singapore-born Australians, with 6,557 individuals that were of Singaporean origin. In 2001, that number increased to 7,661, with most of them residing in Melbourne.

The community had Singaporeans of mixed ethnicities, with most of them being Chinese Singaporeans, followed by Malay Singaporeans and Indian Singaporeans, which echoed the diverse ethnic make-up of Singapore's population. A variety of languages was spoken at home by the community, with 40% speaking Mandarin and other Chinese varieties like Hokkien, 6% speaking Malay and 2% speaking Tamil and the rest speaking English.

By 2016, according to the Australian Census, Victoria was home to the highest number of Singaporean Australians, 16,063 people, out of the total of 54,939 in the community. Western Australia was 2nd, being home to 14,987 individuals, followed by New South Wales and Queensland. 47.7% were of Chinese Singaporean ancestry, 8.8% were of Indian Singaporean ancestry and 6.6% were of Malay Singaporean ancestry. English was the home language of 49% in the community, followed by Mandarin at 28.8% and 6% spoke Malay.

=== Religion ===
Religion of Singaporean Australians
1. No religion (32.1%)
2. Protestant (25.5%)
3. Catholic (18.0%)
4. Buddhism (7.90%)
5. Islam (7.60%)
6. Hinduism (5.80%)
7. Other (3.10%)

According to Australian Bureau Statistics in 2016, 24.8% from Singaporean Australians population identifying as Irreligion, 18.9% as Catholic, 9.0% as Buddhist, 6.8% as Muslim and 6.4% as Protestant.

In 2021, 29.8% from Singaporean Australians population identifying as Irreligion, 18.0% as Catholic, 7.9% as Buddhist, 7.6% as Muslim and 6.3% as Other Christian.

== Notable people ==
- Alice Tay – president of the Human Rights and Equal Opportunity Commission (1998–2003)
- Astra Sharma – Tennis player
- Bernice Eu – Politician
- Ian Goodenough – Politician
- Jessica Gomes – Model
- Khym Lam – Actress
- Madison de Rozario – Paralympic athlete
- Rex Goh – Rock guitarist
- Peter Senior – Professional golfer
- Patrick Grove – Entrepreneur, co-founder and CEO of Catcha Group
- Sashi Cheliah – Winner of tenth series of MasterChef Australia in 2018
- Charlie Teo – neurosurgeon
- Tang Liang Hong – Political candidate in Singapore, moved to Australia after

== See also ==
- Australia-Singapore relations
- Australians in Singapore
