= History of Asian Australians =

Total population
- Approximately 17.4% of the population (2021 census) (Note: Number of ancestry responses classified within the "North-East Asian", "South-East Asian" and "Southern and Central Asian" groups under the Australian Standard Classification of Cultural and Ethnic Groups as a proportion of the total population. Excludes North African and Middle Eastern Australians who are separately classified. Ancestry figures do not amount to 100% as the Australian Bureau of Statistics allows up to two ancestry responses per person.); Chinese Australians: 1,390,637; Indian Australians: 783,958; Filipino Australians: 408,836; Vietnamese Australians: 334,781; Nepalese Australians: 138,463; Korean Australians: 136,896; Pakistani Australians: 97,593; Sri Lankan Australians: 95,946; Thai Australians: 91,942; Indonesian Australians: 85,978; Japanese Australians: 78,049; Malaysian Australians: 61,308; Cambodian Australians: 57,096; Afghan Australians: 54,534

Regions with significant populations
- Capital cities of Australia: Sydney, Melbourne, Brisbane, Perth, Adelaide, Darwin and Canberra; Australian towns and regions: Notably Broome and the Torres Strait Islands (Note: Broome and the Torres Strait Islands were historically home to thousands of Asian migrants that settled in northern Australia as part of the pearling industry. These Asian migrants were of Japanese, Chinese, Filipino, Malay and Sri Lankan (mostly Sinhalese descent). These migrants integrated into local society marrying Indigenous Australians (Aboriginal Australians and Torres Strait Islanders), which was very common at the time, and European Australians later on. Today, many long time residents in Broome and the Torres Strait Islands have partial Asian ancestry tracing back to these early migrants.); External territories of Australia: Christmas Island and Cocos Islands (More than 90% of the total populations of the two territories) (Note: Christmas Island and the Cocos (Keeling) Islands was formerly administered as part of Singapore before it was transferred to Australia. The population of Christmas Islanders of full or partial Asian descent consists mainly of Australians of Singaporean descent, particularly Singaporean Chinese and Malay descent but also some individuals of Singaporean Indian descent. The majority of inhabitants on the Cocos Islands are the Cocos Malays, who are the indigenous people of Cocos Island. There are also minority populations of ethnic Chinese and Indian descent.)

Languages
- Australian English · Asian languages

Religion
- Buddhism · Christianity · Hinduism · Sikhism · Islam · East Asian religions · Indian religions · other religions

Asian Australian history is the history of Asian ethnic and racial groups in Australia who trace their ancestry to Asia. The term Asian Australian, was first used in the 1950s by European Australians who wanted to strengthen diplomatic and trade ties with Asia for the benefit of the Australian community. The term was not originally used to describe or recognise the experiences of people of Asian descent living in Australia. It was only in the late 1980s and 1990s that the term "Asian Australian" was adopted and used by Asian Australians themselves to discuss issues related to racial vilification and discrimination. Today, the term "Asian Australian" is widely accepted and used to refer to people of Asian descent who are citizens or residents of Australia, though its usage and meaning may vary within the Asian Australian community.

== Hostility to immigration ==
Hostility towards Asian immigration in Australia has a long history, dating back to the implementation of the "White Australia" policy in 1901. This policy, which was in place until 1973, consisted of laws and policies aimed at excluding non-white immigrants, particularly those from Asia, from settling in the country. Despite efforts to reform or repeal the policy over the years, the legacy of the White Australia policy and hostility towards Asian immigration has persisted in various forms, including instances of racism and discrimination towards Asian Australians

== Chronology ==
=== Pre-European Colonisation ===
- c. 50,000 BCE: The first wave of migration from the Indian subcontinent to Australia may have occurred, although there is limited evidence to support this. Linguistic similarities between some Aboriginal languages and South Indian languages suggest a potential historical connection.
- c. 4230 BCE: Genetic and archaeological evidence indicates a substantial influx of people from India. This period coincides with the introduction of new plant processing and stone tool technologies, as well as the appearance of dingoes and spears in the Australian fossil record.
- c. 1330: Chinese sailor Wang Dayuan explores much of Southeast Asia, and potentially sights Australia, although there is no documented evidence of this.
- c. 1422: Chinese admiral Zheng He and his fleet explore much of Southeast Asia, and potentially visit Australia, although there is no documented evidence of this.
- 1606: The Janszoon voyage marks the first of multiple visits to Australia on behalf of the Dutch East India Company, which employed some Asian people.
- c. 1720: Makassan trepangers from Sulawesi begin harvesting sea cucumbers off the coast of the Kimberley and Arnhem Land, and establish contact with Aboriginal Australians including the Yolngu people. This may have begun as early as 1640 or the 1500s.

=== 1800s ===
- 1800–1816: A small group of Indians, sent as convict laborers by British colonial authorities, arrive in Australia.
- 1808: Britain bans the slave trade within the British Empire.
- 1818: Mak Sai Ying, the first recorded Chinese settler in Australia, arrives in Port Jackson, Sydney aboard the ship Laurel. He begins work as a carpenter for John Blaxland, whom he met on the voyage.
- 1833: Slavery is abolished in the British Empire, replaced by a system of indentured labor. Reformers begin raising concerns about the similarities between indentured labor and slavery.
- 1830s–1840s: A significant social movement emerges in Australia, opposing the transportation of convicts and advocating for anti-slavery reforms. This movement criticizes the wealthy pastoralists who rely on convict labor.
- 1841: British Colonial Secretary Sir James Stephen warns against introducing "black races" to Australia, advocating for the country to remain populated by the "English race."
- 1847–1853: Around 3,500 Chinese indentured laborers, primarily from Fujian province, arrive in Australia to work as shepherds, rural laborers, cooks, and gardeners.

=== 1850s ===
- 1853: Over 5,000 people, including seven Chinese individuals, sign the "Bendigo Goldfields Petition" demanding improved conditions on the goldfields.
- 1854: The Eureka Stockade rebellion takes place, involving mainly European miners, though Chinese miners are also present in limited numbers.
- 1854–1855: The Goldfields Commission introduces anti-Chinese immigration laws, including residential head taxes, passenger limits, and restrictions on Chinese residential areas.
- 1857: The Buckland River riots result in the deaths and expulsion of approximately 2,000 Chinese miners. The Chinese community in Ballarat grows to 5,000.
- 1859: The "Red Ribbon" movement, protesting discriminatory laws, gains traction, with thousands of Chinese residents participating in marches in Bendigo and Castlemaine. A petition is presented to the government.
- 1859: The first recorded arrival of a Baloch cameleer from what is now Pakistan.

=== 1860s ===
- 1861: The Chinese population in the Ararat district declines from 3,000 to 500 due to punitive taxes. Local residents, including both Chinese and European, petition for a reduction in the £4 tax.
- 1862: Anti-Chinese legislation, enacted in 1855, is suspended.
- 1863: Chinese shopkeepers and merchants in Ballarat petition for the cessation of gambling at Golden Point.
- 1866: The See Yup Temple in South Melbourne is rebuilt in permanent form, having been established in the 1850s.
- 1868: William Young (Tsze Hing) conducts a survey, discovering that around 800 Chinese residents are engaged in seasonal harvesting and other industries like mining, shearing sheds, and running Chinese stores.
- 1860s: Many cameleers from regions like Sindh, Peshawar, Baluchistan, and Punjab (now part of Pakistan) arrive in Australia, often misidentified as "Afghan" by colonial authorities.

=== 1870s ===
- 1871: Despite the formal abolition of "camps," many Chinese residents remain in areas like Ballarat East (700 people) and Bendigo's Ironbark (400 people). Over 3,000 Chinese live outside major gold mining regions.
- 1872: Queen Victoria condemns the exploitation of Pacific Islanders in her address to the British Parliament.
- 1872: Filipino “Manila-men” begin arriving in Australia to work in the Queensland sugar industry and as pearl divers in the Torres Strait and Western Australia.
- 1874–1877: The influx of Chinese miners during the Palmer River Gold Rush in Queensland sparks concerns over labor control in the far north.
- 1876: Queensland Premier John Douglas acknowledges the utility of Chinese labor for developing tropical resources, though concerns about their numbers persist.
- 1878: The Seamen's Strike, protesting the replacement of European seafarers with Chinese workers, ignites anti-Chinese sentiment, with support from Queensland sugar planters.
- 1879: Queensland politician Arthur Hunter Palmer becomes Colonial Secretary, advocating for the use of "coloured labour," which influences Sir Henry Parkes's push for federation.
- October 1879: Sir Henry Parkes publishes a proposal for a federation of Victoria, South Australia, and New South Wales, excluding Queensland due to its reliance on "coloured labour."

=== 1880s ===
- 1880s: European Australians join Chinese protesters in advocating for the rights and social standing of Chinese residents, opposing further immigration restrictions.
- January 1880: Western Australia's Legislative Council offers subsidies to import Chinese laborers, provoking protests from other Australian colonies.
- November–December 1880: An Intercolonial Conference in Melbourne, involving Victoria, South Australia, and New South Wales, focuses on border tariffs and unification.
- January 1881: The Intercolonial Conference in Sydney discusses a unified stance on Chinese immigration, with South Australia agreeing but later exempting the Northern Territory from its anti-Chinese legislation.
- 1881–1887: The South Australian House of Assembly passes five bills to restrict Chinese immigration to the Northern Territory, but all are blocked in the Legislative Council.
- 1883: Over 2,500 Chinese laborers enter Queensland to address labor shortages caused by Pacific Islander workers. This leads to the introduction of stricter immigration laws.
- 1885: Chinese resistance to French military aggression and subsequent modernization heightens strategic concerns in Australia.
- 1885: The Filipino community on Thursday Island reaches 147 people.
- 1886: South Australia passes a Gold Fields Act, excluding Chinese miners from newly discovered goldfields for two years.
- 1886–1887: A surge of Chinese workers arrives in the Northern Territory to construct the Pine Creek railway, raising concerns in other colonies.
- January 1887: Chinese diplomat "Marquis" Tseng criticizes Australia for discriminating against Chinese people and occupying land it cannot defend.
- 1889: The first recorded contact between Australia and Korea occurs when missionaries from Australia arrive in Busan.

=== 1890s ===
- 1890: The formation of the Australian Labor Federation and its success in Western Australian elections leads to the passage of the Chinese Immigration Restriction Act, largely driven by opposition to Chinese immigration.
- 1891–1893: Debate intensifies regarding the employment of Chinese laborers, with growing polarization over Australia's stance on racial exclusivity.
- 1896–1897: The first significant protest against the White Australia policy arises, with Chinese, Japanese, and Indian residents petitioning for better treatment.
- 1897: Prime Minister Edmund Barton introduces the first immigration restriction legislation, marking the official beginning of the "White Australia" policy.
- 1889: The first recorded contact between Australia and Korea occurs when Australian missionaries arrive in Busan.

=== 1900s ===
- 1901: The Immigration Restriction Act solidifies the White Australia Policy, limiting the possibilities for the development of the Northern Territory through "coloured labour."
  - Deputy Prime Minister Alfred Deakin defends the Act, citing racial determinism and national self-preservation as key justifications.
  - The Chinese community in Victoria erects an archway to celebrate the Federation of Australia.
  - Prominent Chinese leaders advocate for amendments to the national immigration laws that restrict Chinese migration.
  - By 1901, around 7,500 Chinese people reside in Victoria, with one-third living in Melbourne's Little Bourke Street Chinatown, working in a variety of professions, including as merchants, professionals, and domestic workers.
- 1902: The Chinese Times, a Chinese-language newspaper, begins publication in Melbourne.
- 1912: The Chinese furniture trade in Melbourne reaches its peak, particularly in the Little Bourke Street area.
- 1920s: The Chinese furniture trade begins to decline due to the impact of World War I, the rise of European youth and female labor, and increasing mechanization.
  - Travel between Australia and China doubles from pre-World War I levels.
  - Approximately 25% of Chinese women in Australia are born to mixed Chinese and non-Chinese parents.
- 1930s: The median age of Chinese women reaches the typical marriage age, indicating a trend towards family stability in the community.

=== 1901–1945 ===
- Japan, through diplomatic efforts, secures slight adjustments to the White Australia Policy, such as the use of a “dictation test” and temporary entry for merchants, students, and visitors. Similar concessions are later made to India and China.
- Despite some adjustments, the underlying racial ideologies of the White Australia Policy remain largely intact.

=== 1930s ===
- 17 March 1934: John Latham, Deputy Prime Minister and Minister for External Affairs, embarks on the first Eastern Goodwill Trade Mission, aiming to develop new export markets in Asia following the Great Depression.
- 1935: Australia appoints trade commissioners to Shanghai, Tokyo, and Batavia, signifying an increased focus on strengthening trade ties with Asia.
- 1936: The Department of External Affairs is established, marking a significant shift in Australia's diplomatic focus towards Asia.
- 1937-1946: The Austral-Asiatic Bulletin, published by the Australian Institute of International Affairs, highlights the growing interest in understanding and engaging with Australia's Asian neighbours.
- Pre-World War II: Several hundred Chinese residents return to Australia after fleeing Japanese occupation of China.

=== 1940s ===
- 1940s: The Chinese-Australian population begins to recover, with approximately 3,500 wartime arrivals.
  - An influx of students from across the Asia-Pacific region begins, reaching around 10,000 by the late 1950s.
- 1945: World War II ends, and the rise of Asian nationalism challenges Western colonial dominance.
  - Australia, under Prime Minister Ben Chifley’s Labor government, cautiously supports the independence movements in Southeast Asia.
  - The Sydney Morning Herald acknowledges the shifting international landscape and advocates for a more flexible immigration policy, though still emphasizing the exclusion of non-Europeans.
  - Australia participates in drafting the UN's anti-discrimination clause but maintains its right to determine its racial composition.
- 1946: The Philippines formally establishes diplomatic relations with Australia and appoints Roberto Regalato as the first Philippine Consul General.The Philippines gains independence from the United States.
- 1947: Immigration Minister Arthur Calwell initiates mass migration from Europe to maintain Australia's "white British" character.
  - Calwell extends temporary entry provisions for Chinese businessmen, balancing diplomatic relations with China while asserting the primacy of the White Australia Policy.
  - Calwell also authorizes the forced repatriation of Asian wartime refugees, which sparks public controversy.
- 1947: Australia participated in the UN Commissions on Korea.
- 1949: The Liberal-Country Party Coalition, led by Robert Menzies, wins the election.
  - Harold Holt replaces Calwell as Immigration Minister.
  - Holt cancels deportation orders against remaining wartime refugees but reiterates his commitment to preserving Australia's racial homogeneity.
  - The Communist Party wins in China, and the Cold War begins to extend into Asia.
  - The Philippines opens a consulate in Sydney.

=== 1950s ===
- January 1950: External Affairs Minister Sir Percy Spender stresses the importance of Asia and the Pacific in Australia's foreign policy during the Conference of Commonwealth Foreign Ministers.
- 9 January 1950: The Colombo Plan, aimed at promoting economic and social development in Asia, is established, marking the beginning of stronger Asia-focused engagement in Australia.
- 1951: R.G. Casey assumes the portfolio of External Affairs and actively promotes the Colombo Plan, emphasizing its role in fostering mutual understanding between Australia and Asia.
- 1952: The Australia-China Friendship Society is founded to promote positive relations between Australia and China.
- 1953: The ROK Consulate-General in Sydney was opened.
- 1954: Jim Cairns, future Labor treasurer, criticizes Australia's immigration policy as an impediment to better relations with Asia.
- 1956: The first issue of Asiana: Asian-Australian Forum is published to promote understanding between Australia and Asia.
- 1956: The Australian-Asian Association of Victoria (AAAV) is officially established to foster relations between Australia and Asia.
- 1956: The Philippine consulate in Sydney gains embassy status.
- 1957: The AAAV expands to Sydney and Adelaide, and the Hemisphere magazine is launched to highlight Australian involvement in Asia.
- 1959: The Immigration Reform Group forms at the University of Melbourne, advocating for changes to the immigration policy to allow greater Asian migration.
- 1959: The Pakistan Australia Association is formed.
- 1950-1953: Australia participated in the Korean War.

=== 1960s ===
- 1962: The Immigration Reform Group publishes the pamphlet Control or Colour Bar, challenging the White Australia policy.
- 1962: The Philippine Embassy is moved to Canberra.
- 1963: Sir Edward “Weary” Dunlop becomes president of the AAAV, a position he holds until 1993.
- 1967: The AAAV refocuses its mission to promote mutual understanding between Australians and Asian Australians.
- 1968: The Korean Society of Sydney, the first of its kind in Australia, was established in Redfern. The society is now based in Campsie and Croydon Park and claims to be the largest Korean Society in the southern hemisphere.
- 1969: Dr Ashfaque Amad establishes the Australia Pakistan Association of South Australia.

=== 1970s ===
- 1971: Fewer than 500 Korean-born residents were recorded in the Australian census. The majority of these individuals were students or domestic workers who had arrived after 1921. Only 72 Korean-born people, including immigrants from both South and North Korea, were recorded as living in Victoria.
- 1972-1975: The first significant wave of Korean immigration to Australia. This wave, consisting of approximately 500 people, primarily settled in Sydney. This influx of Koreans was influenced by the withdrawal of South Korean citizens from military and non-military service in the Vietnam War. Instead of returning to Korea, many sought work opportunities in other countries, with a significant number arriving in Australia on tourist visas. Many of these individuals overstayed their visas and found employment.
- 1973: The Whitlam government introduces legislation to allow all migrants, regardless of nationality, to obtain Australian citizenship, effectively ending the White Australia policy.
- 1973: The Family Reunion Program further increases Filipino migration to Australia.
- 1974: The Whitlam Labor government introduced the first amnesty provision for visa overstayers and their families. This amnesty allowed approximately 500 "illegal immigrants" to obtain residency, while many others were deported. Sydney's first ethnic Korean church was also established this year.
- 1975: The fall of South Vietnam led to many Koreans working for military contract firms migrating to Australia under relaxed tourist visa conditions. Some of these individuals were granted permanent residency through amnesty arrangements.
- 1979: Koreans who had been working outside of Korea in countries like Iran, Saudi Arabia, Paraguay, Uruguay, and Argentina, arrived in Australia with hopes of obtaining residency.
- 1970s: The Australian-Asian Community Welfare Association is formed to support Asian Australian communities.

=== 1980s ===
- 1980: The last amnesty provision for visa overstayers in Australia. By this time, the number of Korean-born residents in Victoria had increased to 389, including immigrants from both South and North Korea.
- 1981: The Australian census records 116 Pakistani-born South Australians.
- 1982: Rob Lucas, born to a Japanese mother, is elected to the South Australian Legislative Council, becoming the first Asian Australian member of an Australian state or territory parliament.
- 1984: Professor Geoffrey Blainey’s controversial comments on Asian immigration spark the "Blainey affair," igniting debates about racism and immigration.
- 1984: The Asian Australian Action Committee is formed in Brisbane to advocate for the rights of Asian Australians.
- 1985: The Asian Community Information and Resource Centre (AARC) is established in Melbourne to support Asian Australians and lobby for social justice.
- 1985: The Pakistani Association of South Australia is founded.
- 1986: The first Korean Buddhist temple was established in Sydney.
- 1986-1987: The AARC holds multiple conferences focused on the growing Asian Australian community and its challenges.
- 1987-1988: Filipino migration to Australia peaks.
- 1980s: Two distinct groups of Korean migrants arrived in Australia. These groups are often referred to as "container migrants" because they arrived with resources and skills, differentiating them from the "empty-handed" amnesty migrants of the 1970s.
  - Mid-1980s: An influx of skilled migrants arrived. These skilled migrants often faced challenges in finding employment commensurate with their qualifications due to language barriers.
  - Late 1980s: A wave of business migrants, driven by government initiatives to boost investment in a struggling economy.

=== 1990s ===
- 1990s: Filipino migration declines due to new restrictions.
- 1990s: Immigration from Pakistan increases significantly, with most immigrants arriving under the Humanitarian Program and the Skilled and Family Migration Streams.
- 1991: The Human Rights and Equal Opportunity Commission publishes a report on racist violence in Australia, focusing on the challenges faced by Asian Australians.
- 1991: The Australian census began counting immigrants from South Korea separately, recording 1,544 South Korean-born individuals in Victoria.
- 1993: By this year, over 70 Korean church congregations were established in Australia, with more than 50 of them located in Sydney.
- 1997: The Asia Society Australia is launched, enhancing Australia's engagement with Asia across business, policy, culture, and education.
- 1997: The Asian Economic Crisis significantly impacted the Korean community in Sydney. Although the number of Koreans arriving on working holiday and visitor visas decreased after 1997, many of these individuals were no longer students but rather unemployed, bankrupt, or displaced citizens of Korea, leading to increased competition for jobs within the Korean community and tensions between established and newly arrived Korean migrants.
- 1999: The AARC disbands, and the Asian Australian Studies Research Network is informally established.
- 1999: Filipinos serve in the Australian-led INTERFET peacekeeping force in East Timor.
- 1999: Chinese-born Tsebin Tchen is elected to the Australian Senate, becoming the first Asian Australian member of the Parliament of Australia.

=== 2000s ===
- 2006: The Asian Australian Studies Research Network is formally established, signifying the growing academic interest in Asian Australian experiences and identity.
- 2006:Over 55,000 Victorians are part of a 206,000-strong China-born population in Australia, making it the third-largest overseas birthplace group and one of the fastest-growing.
  - 190,000 Victorians declare Chinese ancestry, with origins spanning over 30 countries, including Hong Kong, Malaysia, Vietnam, Taiwan, and Singapore.
  - Over half of this group use Chinese languages at home, highlighting the enduring cultural influence of Chinese migration in Australia.
- 2006-2016: Skilled and education-related migration from India more than doubled the Indian-born population in Australia, driven in part by labor shortages during the mining boom. This influx made the Indian diaspora a relatively young community compared to those in the UK, Canada, Singapore, and the US.
- 2006: The Australian census recorded 1,943 residents in Strathfield and 1,429 residents in Campsie claiming Korean ancestry.
- 2007: The Asian Australian Association of Bennelong is formed, demonstrating the emergence of localized Asian Australian organizations focused on community-specific issues and political representation.
- 2007: Malaysian-born Penny Wong is appointed Minister for Climate Change, becoming the first Asian Australian member of the Cabinet of Australia.
- 2000s: The growth of the Korean community in Sydney became increasingly reliant on temporary migration, with a surge in the number of Korean students and working holiday visa holders, while permanent migration declined.

=== 2010s ===
- 2011: The Asian Australian Film Forum and Network is founded, promoting the work of Asian Australian filmmakers and fostering greater representation in the screen industry.
- 2011: The Australian census recorded 10,192 Korean-born people living in Victoria.
- 2012: The Australian government publishes the Australia in the Asian Century White Paper, outlining a strategic vision for Australia's engagement with Asia, with a strong emphasis on economic opportunities.
- 2013: The Asian Australian Alliance is formed, advocating for greater social justice and equity for Asian Australians.
- 2013: The Asian Australian Lawyers Association is established, aiming to promote diversity and inclusion within the legal profession.
- 2013: The Abbott Coalition government launches the New Colombo Plan, a program to promote educational exchange and cultural understanding between Australia and Asia.
- 2014: The Asian Australian Democracy Caucus is founded, highlighting the increasing political engagement of Asian Australians and their desire to influence policy and decision-making processes.
- 2016: The Indian-born population in Australia reached 455,389, becoming the fourth-largest and one of the fastest-growing migrant communities.
- 2018: The Chinese community celebrates 200 years of settlement in Australia.
- 2020: Filipinos are the fifth-largest group of overseas-born residents in Australia.
- 2021: The 75th anniversary of formal diplomatic relations between the Philippines and Australia.
- 2021: The number of people claiming Indian ancestry in Australia increased to approximately 976,000.
- 2022: The Indian-born population in Australia reached 753,520, making it the second largest migrant community after the United Kingdom.

== Timeline of key legislation and judicial rulings ==
- 1855 Chinese Immigration Act, which imposed a tax on Chinese immigrants in Victoria.
- 1861 Chinese Immigration Act, imposed a tax on Chinese immigrants in an effort to restrict their migration to Australia, is later amended to exclude "all Chinese from entering the colony".
- 1870 Naturalization Act, which granted British subjects the right to become naturalised citizens of Australia, but excluded "any person of Asiatic race" from this right.
- 1877 Chinese Immigration Amendment Act, which extended the tax to all of Australia and required Chinese immigrants to obtain a certificate of exemption from the tax before landing.
- 1881 Influx of Chinese Restriction Act, which imposed a tax on Chinese immigrants in an attempt to limit their numbers in Australia.
- 1901 Immigration Restriction Act, effectively bans non-European immigration to Australia.
- 1914 War Precautions Act, restricted the freedom of groups and individuals thought to be a threat, including those critical of Australia's involvement in World War I. These measures required individuals with connections to enemy nations to register as 'aliens' and many were interned in camps across the country. During World War II, Japanese Australians, many of whom were Australian citizens, were also interned as "enemy aliens" and sent to camps in New South Wales, Queensland, and South Australia.
- 1945 Darwin Lands Acquisition Act, forcibly acquired land owned by Chinese Australians in Darwin, ending the local Chinatown. Proposed as a means of "eliminating undesirable elements," the act resulted in the destruction of homes and businesses in the area.
- 1948 Nationality and Citizenship Act, established Australian citizenship as a legal status separate from British nationality. It also established the process for acquiring Australian citizenship through birth, descent, adoption, or naturalisation. The act also included provisions for the loss of Australian citizenship, such as through marriage to a foreign national or through membership in a foreign military organization.
- 1958 Migration Act, which established the legal framework for the management of immigration to Australia.
- 1975 Racial Discrimination Act, made it unlawful to discriminate against a person on the grounds of their race, colour, descent, or national or ethnic origin. This act also established the Human Rights and Equal Opportunity Commission (HREOC) to deal with complaints of racial discrimination and to promote understanding and acceptance of the principle of equal rights. The act applies to various areas of public life, including employment, education, and the provision of goods and services.

This is not an exhaustive list, and there may be other legislation and judicial rulings that are relevant to the history of Asians in Australia.

== See also ==
- Asian Australians
- Asian immigration to Australia
- History of Asian Americans
