= Penny Wong =

Australian politician (born 1968)

Senator the Honourable; Penny Wong
- 黃英賢
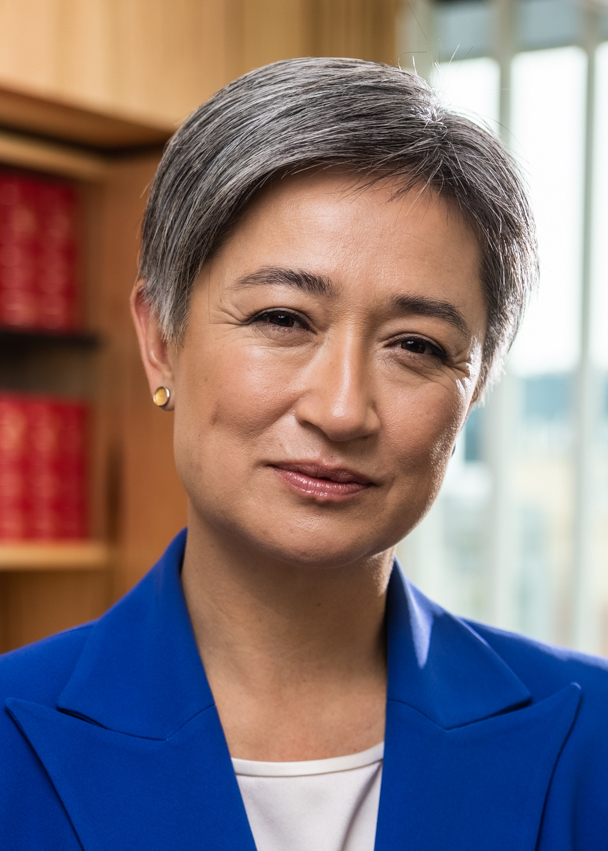
- Official portrait, 2021

Minister for Foreign Affairs
- Incumbent
- Assumed office 23 May 2022
- Prime Minister: Anthony Albanese
- Preceded by: Marise Payne

Leader of the Government in the Senate
- Incumbent
- Assumed office 1 June 2022
- Prime Minister: Anthony Albanese
- Deputy: Don Farrell
- Preceded by: Simon Birmingham
- In office 27 June 2013 – 18 September 2013
- Prime Minister: Kevin Rudd
- Deputy: Jacinta Collins
- Preceded by: Stephen Conroy
- Succeeded by: Eric Abetz

Leader of the Opposition in the Senate
- In office 18 September 2013 – 23 May 2022
- Deputy: Stephen Conroy; Don Farrell; Kristina Keneally
- Leader: Bill Shorten; Anthony Albanese
- Preceded by: Eric Abetz
- Succeeded by: Simon Birmingham

Minister for Finance and Deregulation
- In office 14 September 2010 – 18 September 2013
- Prime Minister: Julia Gillard; Kevin Rudd
- Preceded by: Lindsay Tanner
- Succeeded by: Mathias Cormann

Minister for Climate Change
- In office 3 December 2007 – 14 September 2010
- Prime Minister: Kevin Rudd; Julia Gillard
- Preceded by: Office created
- Succeeded by: Greg Combet

Senator for South Australia
- Incumbent
- Assumed office 1 July 2002
- Preceded by: Chris Schacht

Personal details
- Born: Penelope Ying-Yen Wong; 5 November 1968 (age 58) Kota Kinabalu, Sabah, Malaysia
- Citizenship: Australia; Malaysia (until 2001)
- Party: Labor
- Spouse: Sophie Allouache (m. 2024)
- Children: 2
- Education: University of Adelaide (BA, LLB); University of South Australia (LPC)
- Website: pennywong.com.au

Chinese name
- Traditional Chinese: 黃英賢
- Simplified Chinese: 黄英贤
Transcriptions
Standard Mandarin
- Hanyu Pinyin: Huáng Yīngxián
Hakka
- Pha̍k-fa-sṳ: Vòng Yîn-hèn
Yue: Cantonese
- Yale Romanization: Wòhng Yīng-yìhn
- Jyutping: Wong4 Jing1-jin4

Penelope Ying-Yen Wong (born 5 November 1968) is an Australian politician who has served as the minister for foreign affairs and the leader of the Government in the Senate in the Albanese government since 2022. A member of the Labor Party, she has been a senator for South Australia since 2002, and served as a minister in the Rudd, Gillard, and second Rudd governments.

Born in Kota Kinabalu, Sabah, Malaysia, to a Chinese-Malaysian father from the town of Sandakan and an English-Australian mother from Adelaide, Wong was educated at Scotch College prior to attending the University of Adelaide, graduating with Bachelor of Arts and Bachelor of Laws degrees. She then worked as a lawyer and political advisor. Wong entered politics by winning a Senate seat in the 2001 election.

Following Labor's victory in the 2007 election, she was appointed Australia's first-ever Minister for Climate Change, going on to represent the country at the landmark 2009 UN Climate Change Conference in Copenhagen. Following the 2010 election, Wong was moved to become Minister for Finance and Deregulation, and in June 2013, she was elected by her colleagues to become Leader of the Government in the Senate. Following Labor's defeat in the 2013 election, Wong held several roles in the shadow cabinets of both Bill Shorten and Anthony Albanese, serving as Leader of the Opposition in the Senate throughout. Upon Labor's victory at the 2022 election, Wong was appointed Minister for Foreign Affairs, and resumed her role as Leader of the Government in the Senate.

In 2008, she became the first Asian-Australian in an Australian cabinet. She was also the first female openly LGBTI Australian federal parliamentarian, and was an instrumental figure in the legalisation of same-sex marriage in Australia in 2017, reversing her previous endorsement of Labor Party policy that had opposed it. On 6 March 2024, Wong became the longest-serving female cabinet minister in the history of the Australian Parliament.

== Early life and education ==
Penelope Ying-Yen Wong was born on 5 November 1968 in Kota Kinabalu, the capital of Sabah, which had become part of the Federation of Malaysia in 1963. Her parents were Jane (née Chapman) (died 2024), an English Australian whose forebears first reached South Australia on Cygnet in 1836, and Francis Wong (1941–2023), a Chinese-Malaysian architect-cum-town-planner who hailed from Sandakan, the former capital and second-largest city or town located in the state's east coast. Penny Wong's parents had met in the early 1960s, when Francis Wong was studying architecture at the University of Adelaide under the Colombo Plan. Wong grew up speaking Bahasa Malaysia (particularly the Sabahan dialect) and Chinese (her native vernacular dialects of Cantonese and Hakka), in addition to English which was her first language and the primary language spoken at home by her mixed-race parents. At five years old, she began attending the Kinabalu International School. After her parents separated, she moved to Adelaide, South Australia, at the age of eight with her mother and younger brother.

After starting at Coromandel Valley Primary School, Wong gained a scholarship to Scotch College, Adelaide, where she studied chemistry, physics and mathematics. During her time at Scotch College, Wong toured New Caledonia as part of her French-language studies, performed in school productions of plays such as Six Characters in Search of an Author, and co-captained the hockey team.

She was accepted into the Bachelor of Medicine, Bachelor of Surgery at the University of Adelaide, but after spending a year on exchange in Brazil, found she had an aversion to blood. She then studied and graduated with a Bachelor of Arts in Jurisprudence and a Bachelor of Laws with Honours at the University of Adelaide in 1993, followed by a Graduate Diploma of Legal Practice at the University of South Australia.

=== Student politics and activism ===
Through her friendship with David Penberthy, who had also been on exchange in Latin America, Wong joined the Socialist Workers Party-sponsored Committee in Solidarity with Central America and the Caribbean (CISCAC) while at university in 1987, but was not an active member. Wong's connections with CISCAC brought her in contact with a broader group of left-wing activists who opposed the Hawke Labor government's planned changes to university fees. In a July 1988 election, Wong won a position on the board of the Adelaide University Union as part of the newly formed Progressive Education Team. One month later, while protesting outside a state Labor Party convention at the Adelaide Trades Hall, Wong had a conversation with Young Labor member Lois Boswell, who told her that "if you wanted to really make a difference, you had to be inside the room having that battle." Wong joined the Labor Party that day; she credits her decision to her conversation with Boswell, and the Liberal-National Coalition's new "One Australia" policy opposing multiculturalism and Asian immigration.

Wong became involved with the leadership of the Adelaide University Labor Club, and has been a delegate to the South Australian Labor Party State Convention every year since 1989 (with the exception of 1995).

She also worked part-time for the Construction, Forestry, Mining and Energy Union (CFMEU), and won a position on the National Executive of the National Union of Students. A number of her contemporaries at university went on to become Australian politicians, including former senator for South Australia, Natasha Stott Despoja; former Premier of South Australia, Jay Weatherill; and health minister Mark Butler.

== Professional career ==
After graduation, Wong continued her association with the CFMEU as an industrial officer. She was admitted to the South Australian Bar in 1993. During 1995 and 1996, Wong acted as an advisor to the CFMEU and to the newly elected New South Wales state government, specializing in the area of forest policy in the middle of the fierce 1990s environmental battles over logging in NSW.

On returning to Adelaide, Wong began practising law, working as a solicitor at the firm Duncan and Hannon (1996–1999). From 1999 to 2002, she worked as a legal officer with the Liquor, Hospitality and Miscellaneous Union. During this time she also won a position on the ALP's state executive.

During her legal career (1996–2002), Wong appeared as counsel in eleven published decisions of the Australian Industrial Relations Commission, 15 published decisions of the South Australian Industrial Relations Court, eight published decisions of the South Australian Industrial Relations Commission, three published decisions of the South Australian Workers Compensation Appeal Tribunal and ten published decisions of the South Australian Workers Compensation Tribunal.

== Political career ==
=== Election to the Senate ===
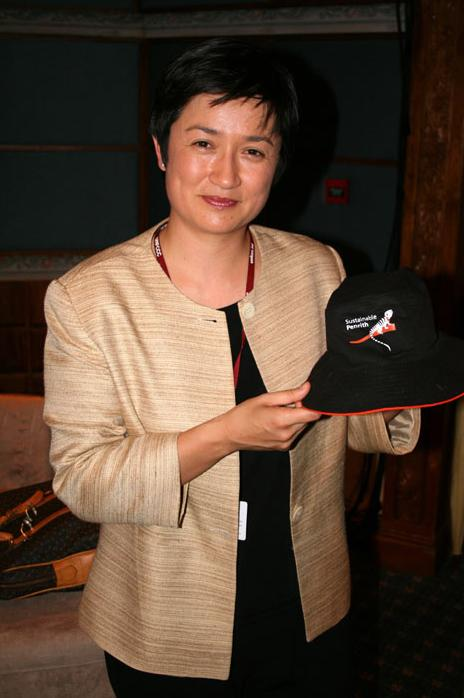
Wong in 2007

Wong ran for pre-selection for the Senate in 2001, and was selected for the top position on the Labor Party's South Australian ticket. She was elected at the 2001 election, her term commencing on 1 July 2002. Wong is a member of Labor Left, and is a member of EMILY's List Australia, the support network for Labor women, and sat on a number of Senate committees, primarily those related to economics.

In June 2005, Wong was appointed Shadow Minister for Employment and Workforce Participation, and Shadow Minister for Corporate Governance and Responsibility. Following the reshuffle in December 2006, she became responsible for the portfolios of Public Administration and Accountability, Corporate Governance and Responsibility, and Workforce Participation.

=== First Rudd government (2007–2013) ===
In December 2007, in the wake of the Labor Party victory in the 2007 election, Wong was appointed to the Cabinet of Australia in the first Rudd government as the Minister for Climate Change, the first person to hold this role in an Australian cabinet. She accompanied then Prime Minister Kevin Rudd to Bali for the international climate change talks. Wong led final negotiations as Chair of the United Nations Working Group in the closing days of the United Nations Climate Change Conference in December 2007, shortly after her appointment as minister.

=== Gillard and Second Rudd governments (2010–2013) ===
Shortly after the commencement of the Gillard government in June 2010, Julia Gillard promoted Wong to succeed Lindsay Tanner as Minister for Finance and Deregulation. At this time, Wong said she agreed with the Labor Party policy on marriage because there was a, "cultural, religious and historical view of marriage being between a man and a woman".

In February 2013, Wong was elected as the ALP's deputy Senate leader following the resignation of Chris Evans, thus becoming Deputy Leader of the Government in the Senate. Wong retained the position of Minister for Finance after Kevin Rudd's successful leadership spill in June 2013. Following Stephen Conroy's resignation and the beginning of the second Rudd government, she also became the Leader of the Government in the Senate. She was the first woman to be elected as ALP Senate leader, and the first woman to serve as Leader of the Government in the Senate. Wong held these roles until Labor's defeat at the 2013 federal election.

=== Opposition (2013–2022) ===
Following Labor's defeat at the 2013 Australian federal election, Wong was elected Leader of the Opposition in the Senate, becoming the first woman to hold the position. She was also appointed Labor's trade and investment spokesperson, before later taking over responsibility for the foreign affairs portfolio from Tanya Plibersek. In these roles, she helped negotiate Australia's interests in the Trans-Pacific Partnership which was ratified in late 2018. In March 2019, Wong was named the 2018 McKinnon Political Leader of the Year.

Following the 2019 Labor leadership contest, Wong retained her positions as Leader of the Opposition in the Senate and Shadow Minister for Foreign Affairs in the new cabinet of Anthony Albanese. At this point she was named part of Albanese's four-person ALP leadership team, along with Richard Marles and Kristina Keneally.

=== Albanese Government (2022–present) ===
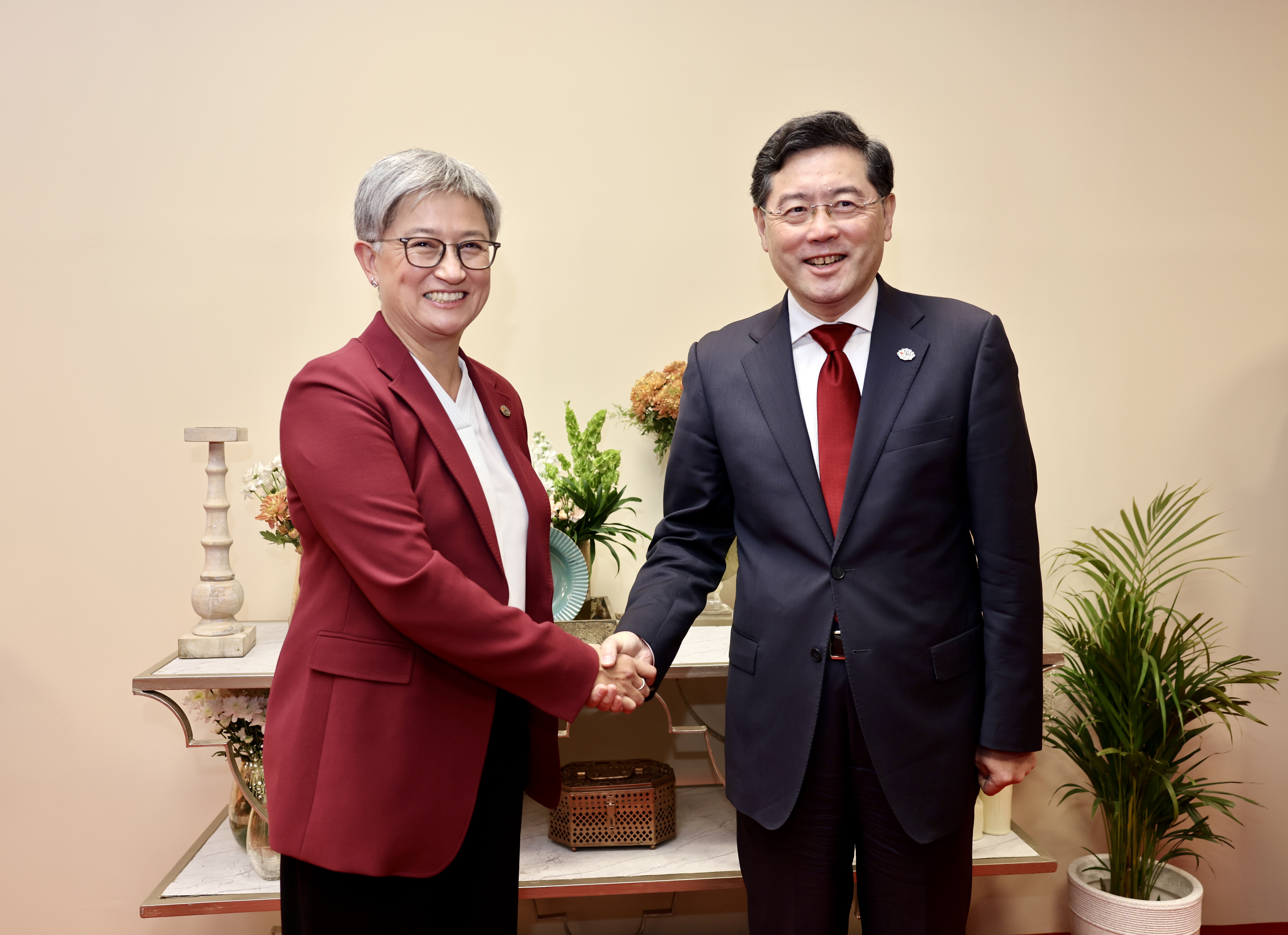
Wong with Chinese Foreign Minister Qin Gang, 2 March 2023

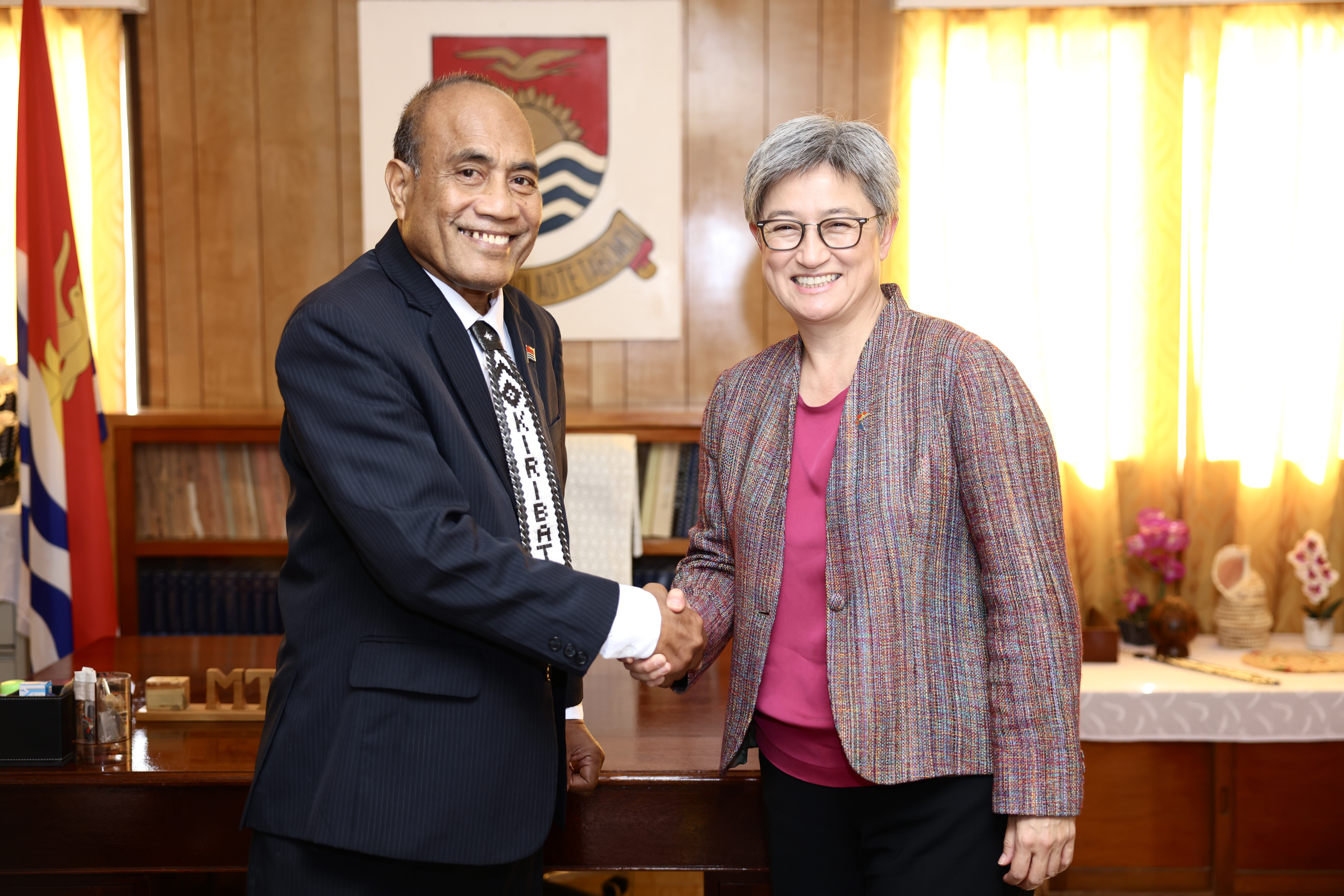
Wong with Kiribati President Taneti Maamau

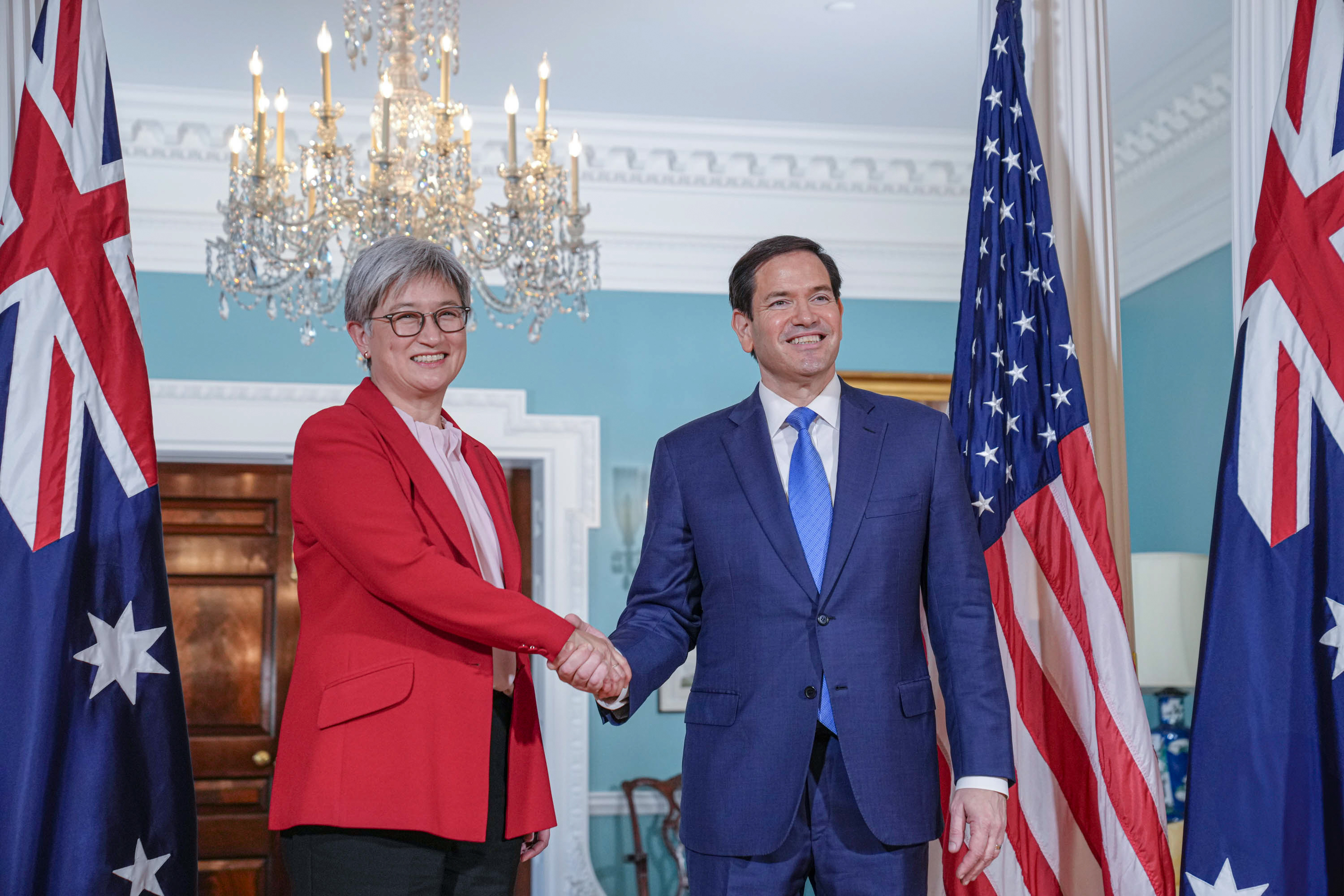
Wong with US Secretary of State Marco Rubio, 1 July 2025

With Labor winning government in the 2022 Australian federal election, Wong became Minister for Foreign Affairs. She was sworn in on 23 May 2022, only two days after the election and before final results were known, in order to attend a pre-scheduled meeting of the Quadrilateral Security Dialogue with newly elected Prime Minister Anthony Albanese. Wong is the first Asian Australian and the first openly LGBTI person to hold the office of Australian Foreign Minister.

On 6 March 2024, Wong became longest-serving female cabinet minister in the history of the Australian Parliament, setting a new record as she served her 2,769th day in cabinet and exceeding the number of days served by former Liberal senator Amanda Vanstone.

==== China ====
Wong sought to improve the relationship between Australia and China, which deteriorated after the previous Australian government under Scott Morrison wanted to investigate the origins of the COVID-19 pandemic and condemned China's mistreatment of ethnic Uyghurs. In December 2022, Wong met Chinese Foreign Minister Wang Yi, becoming the first Australian cabinet minister to visit China since 2019.

In response to Chinese naval exercises in the Tasman Sea in February 2025, Wong met Wang Yi at the G20 summit in South Africa to raise Australian concerns about Chinese naval activities near Australia.

==== Iran ====
During the 2025–2026 Iranian protests, Wong stated that "Australia stands with the brave people of Iran" in their struggle against an "oppressive regime". She strongly condemned the massacres of Iranian protesters.

==== Israel–Palestine ====
In October 2022, Wong announced that the Albanese government would be reversing the previous Morrison government's decision to recognise West Jerusalem as Israel's capital, adding that Jerusalem's status should be decided through peace negotiations between Israelis and Palestinians. In August 2023, Wong confirmed that Australia would revert to its pre-2014 policy of designating the West Bank, East Jerusalem and the Gaza Strip as "Occupied Palestinian Territories" and the Israeli settlements there as "illegal".

Following Hamas' attack on Israel on 7 October 2023, Wong has repeatedly expressed support for Israel during the Gaza war and called for Hamas to release Israeli hostages. Wong also paused funding to the United Nations Relief and Works Agency (UNRWA) in February 2024 after Israel alleged that 12 of the UNRWA's 13,000 staff were either involved in the attacks by Hamas on 7 October or had links to Hamas. She said she was waiting for Israel to provide evidence for the allegations and said that the UNRWA was the only organisation providing substantive support to the occupied Palestinian territories. A report by Channel 4 in the UK said that a dossier provided by Israel to the United Nations contained no evidence to support its allegations; at the same time Wong said that Israel's allegations were serious, noting that UNRWA itself had stated that an investigation was warranted. Wong also expressed concerns about Israel's planned Rafah offensive in February 2024, describing it as "unjustifiable".

In early April 2024, Wong said that the Albanese government was considering recognising Palestinian statehood as a means of facilitating a two-state solution for Israel and Palestine. Her comments attracted criticism from the Executive Council of Australian Jewry President Daniel Aghon but were welcomed by the president of the Australia Palestine Advocacy Network, Nasser Mashni. After the Albanese government voted in favour of a United Nations General Assembly resolution supporting Palestinian membership of the United Nations in May 2024, Wong clarified that the vote did not mean that Australia would recognise Palestinian statehood but was rather about extending "modest additional rights to participate in United Nations forums". She reiterated that Australia would only recognise Palestine "when we think the time is right" and that a reformed Palestinian Authority, not Hamas, should "lead its people" in a future Palestinian state.

In August 2024, Wong joined several world leaders in condemning Israeli Finance Minister Bezalel Smotrich's statement about "starving'" Palestinians in Gaza until hostages are returned. After the International Criminal Court (ICC) issued arrest warrants against Israeli Prime Minister Benjamin Netanyahu and Defence Minister Yoav Gallant, and Hamas military commander Mohammed Deif, Wong stated that the Australian government "respects the independence of the ICC and its important role in upholding international law".

On 11 June 2025, Wong announced that the Australian government would be joining New Zealand, Canada, the United Kingdom and Norway in banning and freezing the assets of two far-right Israeli government ministers Itamar Ben-Gvir and Smotrich for advocating violence and the displacement of Palestinians. When asked in July 2025 about exporting parts for F-35 fighter jets to Israel, Wong said that Australia only exports "non-lethal" parts for the jets.

In late July 2025, Wong joined 14 other foreign ministers including her Canadian and New Zealand counterparts in issuing a joint statement condemning Hamas for its role in the 7 October attacks on Israel and expressing support for recognising a Palestinian state at the next United Nations General Assembly meeting in September 2024. On 9 August 2025, Wong joined her German, Italian, New Zealand and British counterparts in issuing a joint statement condemning Netanyahu's plan to invade and occupy Gaza City. In September 2025, Wong declined to answer whether she would describe the situation in the Gaza Strip as a genocide.

==== The Pacific and New Zealand ====
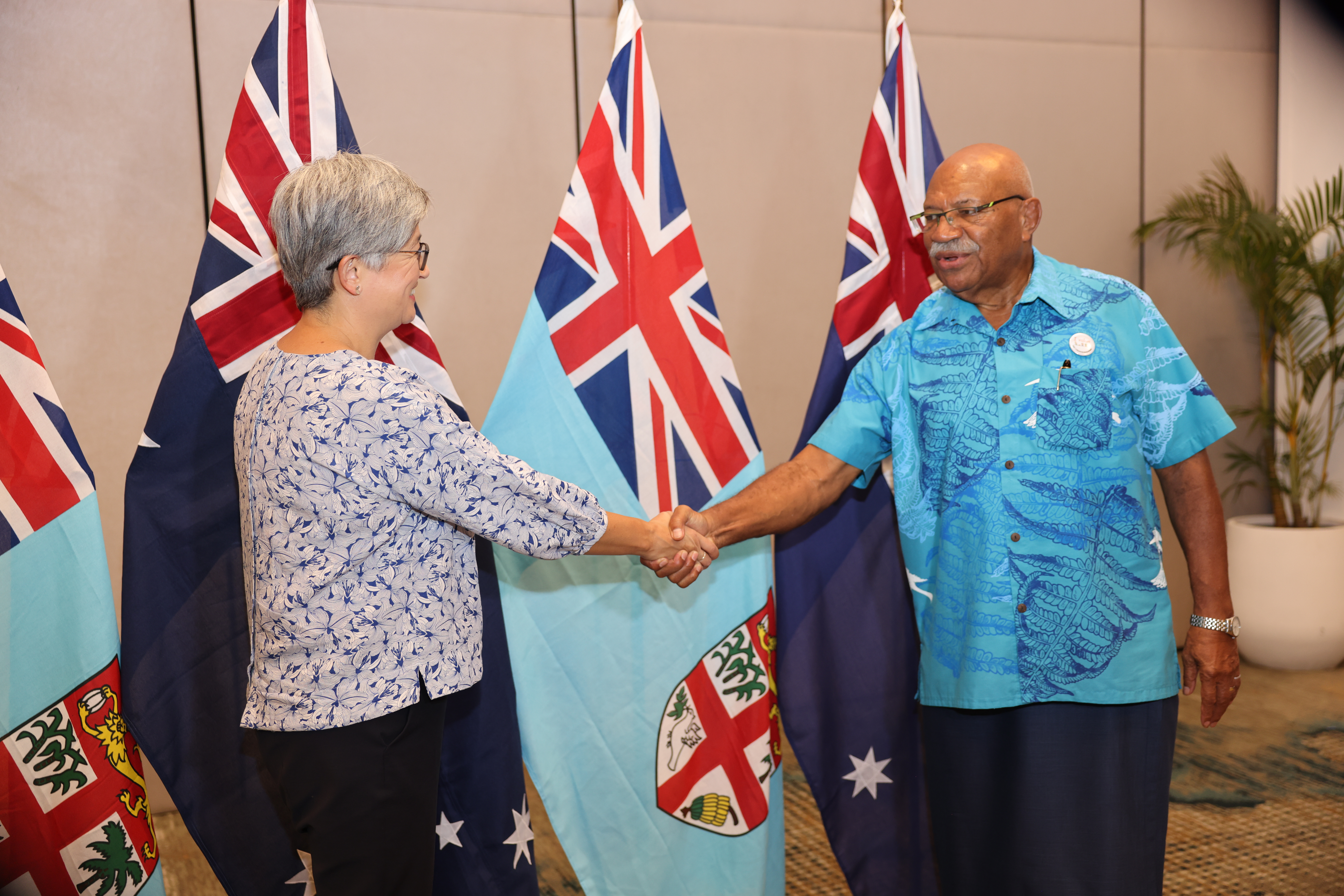
Wong with Fijian Prime Minister Sitiveni Rabuka, 21 February 2023

Within a few days of being sworn into office, Wong visited several Pacific countries to emphasise the new government's approach to climate change and relations with nations in the region, including Fiji (where she addressed the Pacific Islands Forum), Samoa and Tonga.

On 16 June 2022, Wong visited New Zealand Foreign Minister Nanaia Mahuta to reaffirm bilateral relations and cooperation in the areas of climate change, indigenous and Indo-Pacific issues. Wong also stated that her government would consider New Zealand's concerns about Australia's Section 501 deportation policy, which had strained relations between the two countries.

On 1 February 2024, Wong and Defence Minister Richard Marles hosted their New Zealand counterparts Winston Peters and Judith Collins for a joint bilateral meeting of foreign and defence ministers in Melbourne. During the meeting, Marles confirmed that Australia would brief New Zealand about AUKUS Pillar Two, which would focus on advanced military technology, including quantum computing and artificial intelligence. The Australian and New Zealand governments also committed to boosting bilateral security and defence cooperation.

In mid-June 2024, Wong and several cabinet colleagues, including Marles and Pat Conroy, attended the 30th Australia–Papua New Guinea Ministerial Forum in Port Moresby. During the visit, the Albanese government also announced several initiatives under a bilateral security agreement with Papua New Guinea.

==== Southeast Asia ====
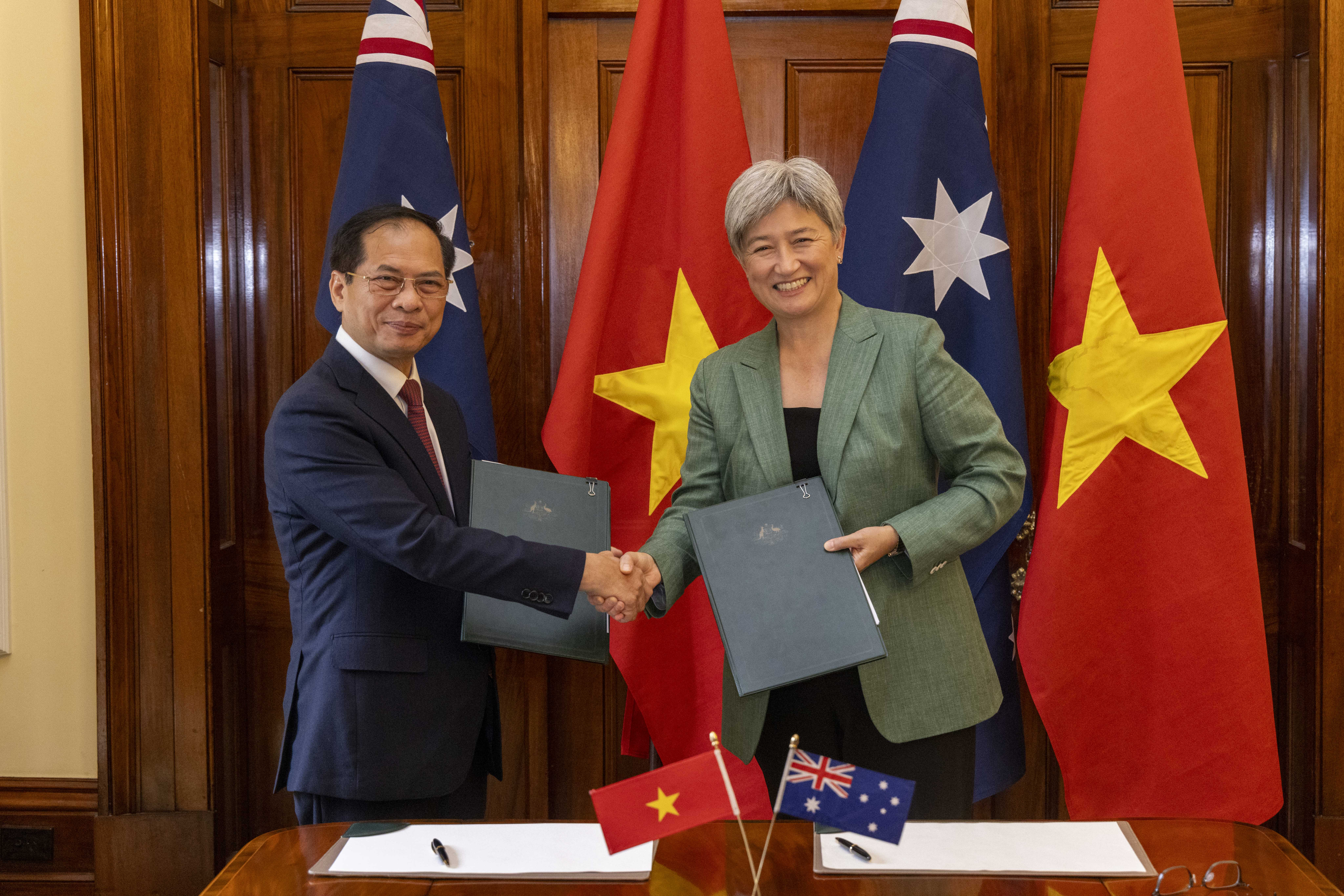
Wong with Vietnamese Foreign Minister Bùi Thanh Sơn, 18 October 2024

On 6 June 2022, Albanese along with Foreign Minister Wong, Trade Minister Don Farrell and Industry Minister Ed Husic visited Indonesian President Joko Widodo in Jakarta to reaffirm relations with Indonesia and ASEAN (Association of Southeast Asian Nations).

Between 4–6 March 2024, Australia hosted a "special summit" between Australia and the member nations of ASEAN to mark 50 years of diplomatic dialogue relations. During the summit, Wong exchanged a memorandum of understanding affirming the Australian–Malaysian comprehensive strategic partnership with Malaysian Foreign Minister Mohamad Hassan at the second Australia-Malaysia annual leaders' meeting. Several diplomatic and economic initiatives were also reached at the summit, including a $2 billion "Southeast Asia Investment Financing Facility", a $140 million infrastructure development partnership, and expanded business visa programs. On 15 December 2024, Wong along with Albanese and Tony Burke, confirmed that surviving Bali Nine members Matthew Norman, Scott Rush, Martin Stephens, Si Yi Chen, and Michael Czugaj had been repatriated to Australia after serving over 19 years in prison in Indonesia. The five had been convicted of attempting to import over eight kilograms of heroin from Bali in 2005.

==== United States ====
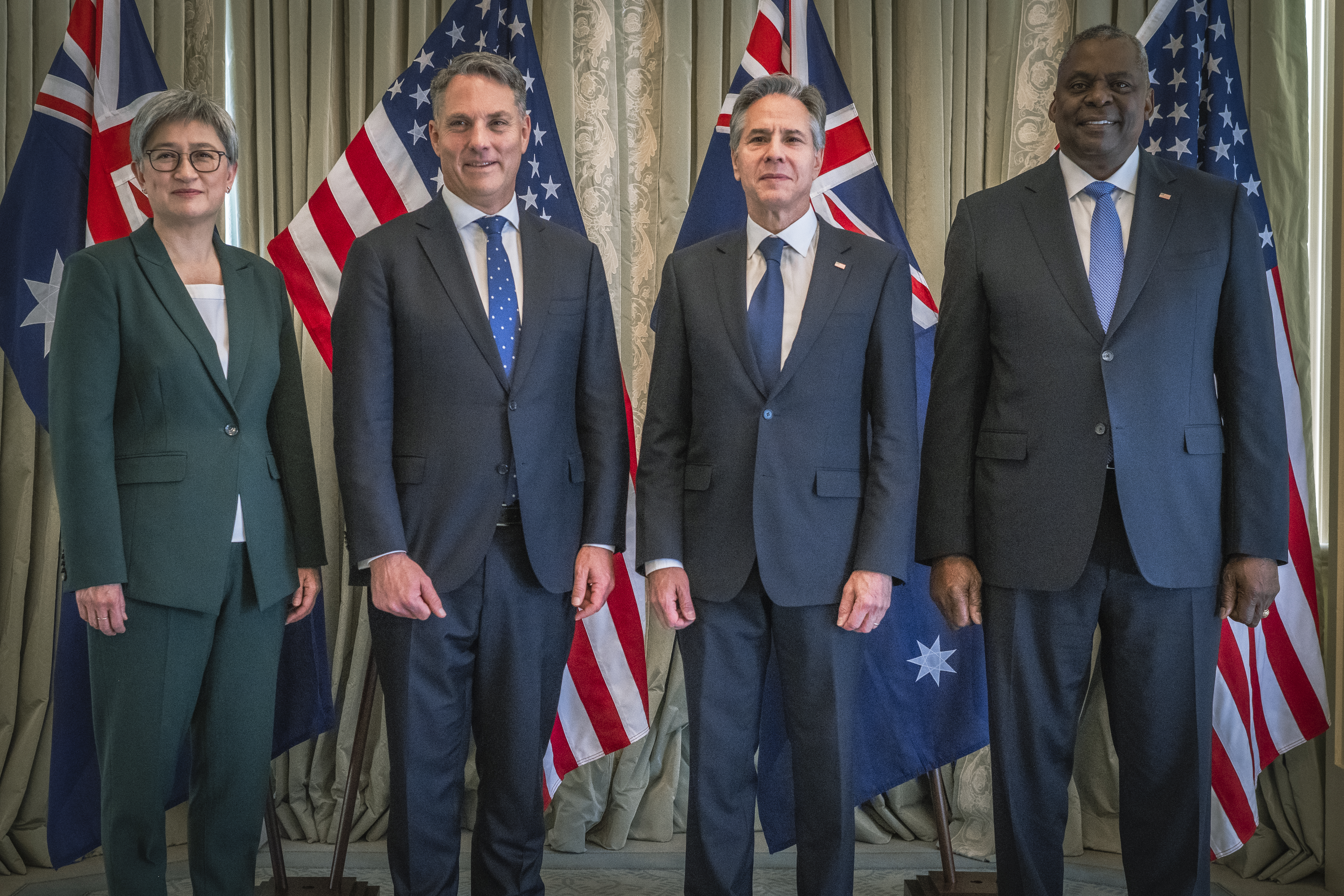
33rd annual Australia–United States Ministerial Consultations (AUSMIN) in Brisbane on 29 July 2023

During a 2023 Senate estimates hearing, Wong was asked about the presence of nuclear weapons aboard nuclear-capable B-52s and B2 Spirits U.S. bombers, which operate regularly out of northern Australia. When U.S. bombers visit Australia, the U.S. government does not tell the Australian government whether the aircraft are carrying nuclear weapons. Wong said the Australian Government "understand[s] and respect[s] the longstanding U.S. policy of neither confirming or denying". She also said the government wanted a greater U.S. military presence in the Indo-Pacific region.

== Public image ==
Wong has been described by her biographer as "principled, intellectual, private, restrained and sane". In 2022, Reuters described her as a "high-profile" figure with "a reputation for plain language and maintaining composure during heated debates."

Several studies and surveys have consistently found Wong to be the most trusted politician in Australia among respondents. Wong has been consistently named as Australia's most trusted politician through studies and opinion polling. Polling conducted by The Australia Institute in 2019 found that Wong was the most trusted federal legislator, though then-Prime Minister of New Zealand Jacinda Ardern topped the poll altogether. Studies taken in March 2022 and December 2023 by Roy Morgan Research found Wong to be Australia's most trusted politician. Wong was deemed the most effective minister in the Albanese government in a survey of Australian Financial Review readers in 2022 and 2023. Opinion polling undertaken by The Sydney Morning Herald and The Age in December 2023 also found Wong to be the most liked politician in the country.

== Personal life ==
Wong is a practising Christian and a member of the Uniting Church. She has said "I do not ever remember having the sense that I denied the existence of God." Others in her wider family from Sabah are Buddhist, but she also has Christian relatives on her paternal side. She held Malaysian citizenship before renouncing it in 2001.

Wong is a lesbian and came out publicly a month after she assumed her Senate seat in 2002. In 2010, Wong was selected by readers of Samesame website as one of the 25 most influential lesbian Australians.

Wong's wife, Sophie Allouache, is a public servant and former University of Adelaide Students' Association president. In December 2011, Allouache gave birth to their first child, after announcing the IVF-assisted pregnancy. Allouache gave birth to their second daughter in 2015. Wong and Allouache married in 2024.

Wong received media attention on a visit to Indonesia in June 2022 for speaking fluent Indonesian in a 52-second video clip.

== See also ==
- History of Australian foreign policy
- First Rudd ministry
- First Gillard ministry
- Second Gillard ministry
- Second Rudd ministry
- First Albanese ministry
- Second Albanese ministry
- Notable AFS exchange students

Parliament of Australia
Preceded by Chris Schacht	Senator for South Australia; 2002–present	Incumbent
Political offices
Preceded by Office created	Minister for Climate Change; 2007–2010	Succeeded by Greg Combet
Preceded by Lindsay Tanner	Minister for Finance and Deregulation; 2010–2013	Succeeded by Mathias Cormann
Preceded by Stephen Conroy	Leader of the Government in the Senate; 2013	Succeeded by Eric Abetz
Preceded by Eric Abetz	Leader of the Opposition in the Senate; 2013–2022	Succeeded by Simon Birmingham
Preceded by Simon Birmingham	Leader of the Government in the Senate; 2022–present	Incumbent
Preceded by Marise Payne	Minister for Foreign Affairs; 2022–present	Incumbent
Party political offices
Preceded by Stephen Conroy	Leader of the Labor Party in the Senate; 2013–present	Incumbent
