= Immigration history of Australia =

The immigration history of Australia began with the initial human migration to the continent around 80,000 years ago when the ancestors of Aboriginal Australians arrived on the continent via the islands of Maritime Southeast Asia and New Guinea. From the early 17th century onwards, the continent experienced the first coastal landings and exploration by European explorers. Permanent European settlement began in 1788 with the establishment of a British penal colony in New South Wales. From early federation in 1901, Australia maintained the White Australia Policy, which was abolished after World War II, heralding the modern era of multiculturalism in Australia. From the late 1970s there was a significant increase in immigration from Asian and other non-European countries.

Australia is also a signatory to the Convention Relating to the Status of Refugees and recognises the right of asylum.

== Original inhabitants ==
The first inhabitants in Australia were the ancestors of the present Indigenous people. Whether these first migrations involved one or several successive waves and distinct peoples is still subject to academic debate, as is its timing. The minimum widely accepted time frame places presence of humans in Australia at 40,000 to 43,000 years Before Present (BP), while the upper range supported by others is 60,000 to 70,000 years BP.

In any event, this migration was achieved during the closing stages of the Pleistocene epoch, when sea levels were typically much lower than they are today. Repeated episodes of extended glaciation resulted in decreases of sea levels by some 100–150 metres (330–490 ft). The continental coastline therefore extended much further out into the Timor Sea than it does today, and Australia and New Guinea formed a single landmass (known as Sahul), connected by an extensive land bridge across the Arafura Sea, Gulf of Carpentaria and Torres Strait.

It is theorised that these original peoples first navigated the shorter distances from and between the Sunda Islands to reach Sahul; then via the land bridge to spread out through the continent. Archaeological evidence indicates human habitation at the upper Swan River, Western Australia by about 40,000 years ago; Tasmania (also at that time connected via a land bridge) was reached at least 30,000 years ago.

The ancestral Australian Aboriginal peoples were thus long established and continued to develop, diversify and settle through much of the continent. As the sea levels again rose at the terminus of the most recent glacial period some 10,000 years ago the Australian continent once more became a separated landmass. However, the newly formed 150-kilometre-wide (93 mi) Torres Strait with its chain of islands still provided the means for cultural contact and trade between New Guinea and the northern Cape York Peninsula.

Several thousand years ago the Melanesian Torres Strait Islander peoples were established in the Torres Strait Islands, and commerce and contact was continued via this route although there is little evidence to suggest immediate influences extended much further south. A more sporadic contact along the northern Australian coast was maintained by seafarers across the Timor and Arafat Seas, with substantial evidence of Macassan contact with Australia in the centuries prior to European arrival, and also evidence of earlier contacts and exchanges by other groups. However, these exchanges do not appear to have involved any extended settlement or migrations of non-Aboriginal peoples to the region.

According to a 2013 German study by a team of researchers on Indigenous Australian DNA genes reveal that a wave of migrants from India arrived in Australia about 4,230 years ago. It shows that the Indian migrants settled in Australia before Captain James Cook's first recorded contact with the Australian coastline. The study also suggests that up to 11 per cent of Aboriginal Australians DNA derives from Indians. During the migration period, dingos first appeared in the fossil suggests that the Indians took their dingos with them and they may also have brought stone tools called microliths. This study overturns the view that Australian continent was isolated from the time it was first colonised about 45,000–50,000 years ago until Europeans discovered Australia in the eighteenth century. Mark Stoneking from the Max Planck Institute for Evolutionary Anthropology says the DNA link could have been by people actually moving, physically travelling from India directly to Australia, or their genetic material could have moved in terms of contact between India and neighbouring populations who then had contact with other neighbour populations and eventually, there would have been contact with Australia. Alan Cooper from the University of Adelaide's Centre for Ancient DNA says that the Indian influence may well have played a role in the development of the Australian Aboriginal culture. It has taken a while for the Indian influence to be discovered because Indigenous Australians have been hesitant to participate in these kinds of genetic studies.

== British colonisation and settlement: 1787–1850s ==
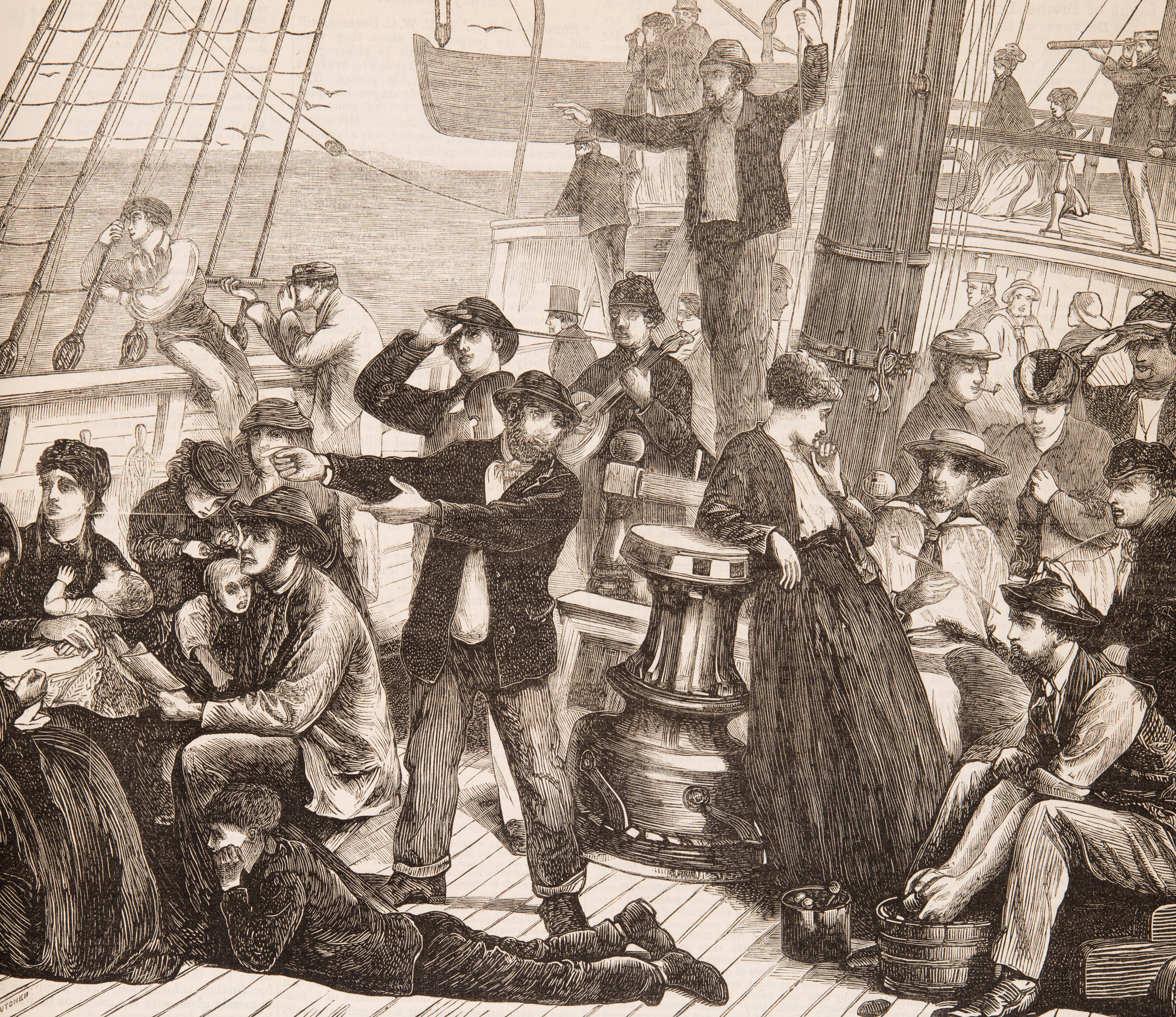
Australian emigrant ship, woodcut print, 1873

After the loss of the United States, Britain experienced overcrowding of its prisons and sought to ease the problems by transportation of its prisoners. In 1787 the First Fleet of 11 ships and about 1350 people under the command of Captain Arthur Phillip sailed for Australia. On 26 January 1788 a landing was made at Sydney Cove. The new colony was formally proclaimed as the Colony of New South Wales on 7 February. Other transport fleets bringing further convicts, as well as free settlers, to the colony followed. As a result of agitation by the free settlers in Sydney, transportation of convicts to Sydney ended in 1840, but continued to the colonies of Van Diemen's Land (where settlement began in 1803) and Moreton Bay (founded 1824, and later renamed Queensland) for some years longer. The settlement of Perth, Western Australia, founded in 1829 by free settlers, received small numbers of juvenile offenders from 1842, and convicts from 1850 until 1868 by which time convicts outnumbered free settlers. In contrast, South Australia, with its capital Adelaide founded in 1836, and Victoria, with its capital Melbourne founded in 1839, were settled only by free settlers. South Australia not only received British migrants, but also a significant influx of Prussian farmers and tradesmen, initially seeking freedom from religious persecution. By the time penal transportation ended in 1868, approximately 165,000 people had entered Australia as convicts.

From about 1815, Sydney began to grow rapidly as free settlers arrived from Britain and Ireland and new lands were opened up for farming. Despite the long and arduous sea voyage, settlers were attracted by the prospect of making a new life on virtually free land. Many settlers occupied land without authority; they were known as squatters and became the basis of a powerful landowning class.

== Gold rushes ==
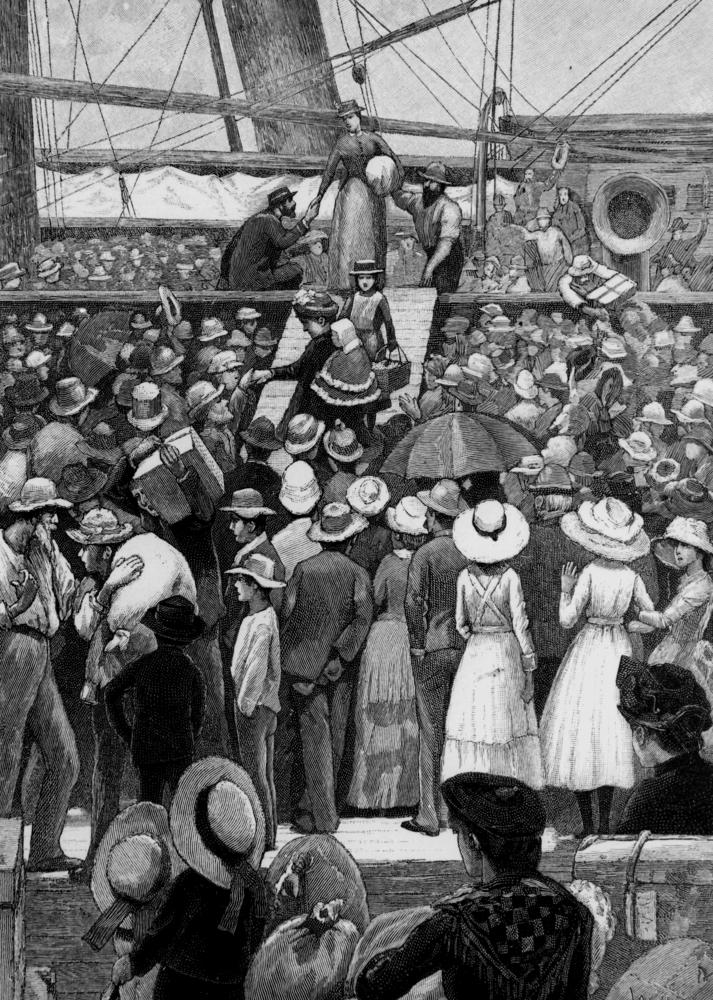
Drawing of migrants disembarking from a ship, ca. 1885

The discovery of gold, beginning in 1851 first near Bathurst in New South Wales and then in the newly formed colony of Victoria, transformed Australia economically, politically and demographically. The gold rushes occurred hard on the heels of a major worldwide economic depression. As a result, about two per cent of the population of the British Isles emigrated to New South Wales and Victoria during the 1850s. There were also a significant number of continental Europeans, North Americans and Chinese.

In 1851 the Australian population was 437,655, of which 77,345, or just under 18%, were Victorians. A decade later the Australian population had grown to 1,151,947 and the Victorian population had increased to 538,628; just under 47% of the Australian total and a sevenfold increase. The rapid growth was predominantly a result of the gold rushes.

During the later half of the 19th century, several colonies funded the immigration of skilled immigrants from Europe, starting with the assistance of German vintners to South Australia. The government found that if it wanted immigrants it had to subsidise migration; the great distance from Europe made Australia a more expensive and less practical destination than Canada, the United States, Brazil or Argentina.

The number of immigrants needed during different stages of the economic cycle could be controlled by varying the subsidy. Before federation in 1901, assisted migrants received assistance from colonial government funds; the British government paid for the passage of convicts, paupers, the military and civil servants. Few immigrants received colonial government assistance before 1831. In Queensland many immigrants passed through the Yungaba Immigration Centre in Brisbane. The facility was built shortly after a period when immigration had been at an all-time high.

Annual average assisted immigrants to Australia
| Period | Australia | NSW | Vic | Qld | SA | Tas | WA |
|---|---|---|---|---|---|---|---|
| 1831–1860 | 18,268 | 5,355 | 8,796 | 479 | 2,728 | 710 | 200 |
| 1861–1900 | 10,087 | 1,912 | 1,304 | 5,359 | 1,161 | 119 | 232 |

== Early federation: 1901–1945 ==
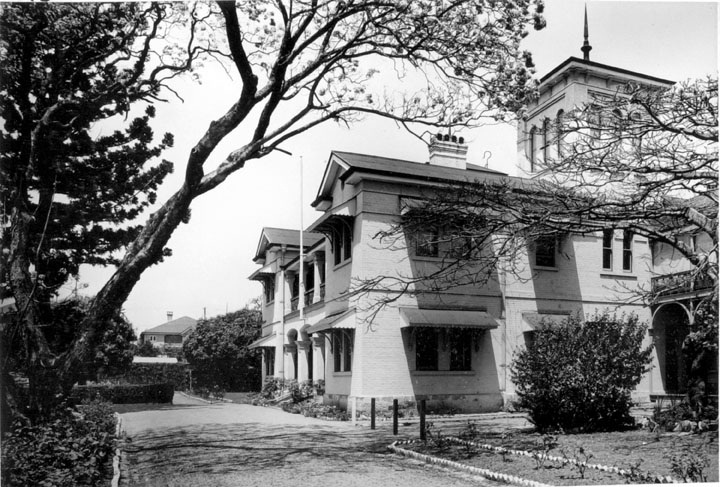
The Yungaba Immigration Centre in Brisbane, 1950

One of the motives for creating a federated Australia was the need for a common immigration policy. There was much resistance to Chinese immigration and the use of indentured workers from New Caledonia to work in the Queensland sugar industry.

The White Australia policy involved the exclusion of all non-European people from immigrating into Australia, and was the official policy of all governments and all mainstream political parties in Australia from the 1890s to the 1950s, and elements of the policy survived until the 1970s. Although the expression 'White Australia policy' was never in official use, it was common in political and public debate throughout the period.

By 1938, many Jews were seeking to leave Germany and Austria due to the Nazi policy of Judenrein, the forced removal of Jews. In June 1938 the Evian Conference was held in France to discuss the Jewish refugee crisis by which time there were hundreds of thousands of Jewish seeking to immigrate. Although many nations attended the conference and expressed their concerns for the refugees, no progress was made towards re-settlement of the refugees. Australia agreed to accept 15,000 Jewish refugees over three years with Australia's delegate, Tomas W. White saying "as we have no real racial problem, we are not desirous of importing one."

A predominantly European nation on the periphery of Asia, historically many white citizens of Australia feared being demographically overwhelmed by the heavily populated Asian countries to the north. Following the attacks on Darwin and the associated fear of Imperial Japanese invasion in World War II, Minister of Immigration Arthur Calwell stated in 1947: "We have 25 years at most to populate this country before the yellow races are down on us." This concern about Australia's demographic vulnerability was a driving force behind the country's massive post-war program of European immigration.

== Post-war immigration ==
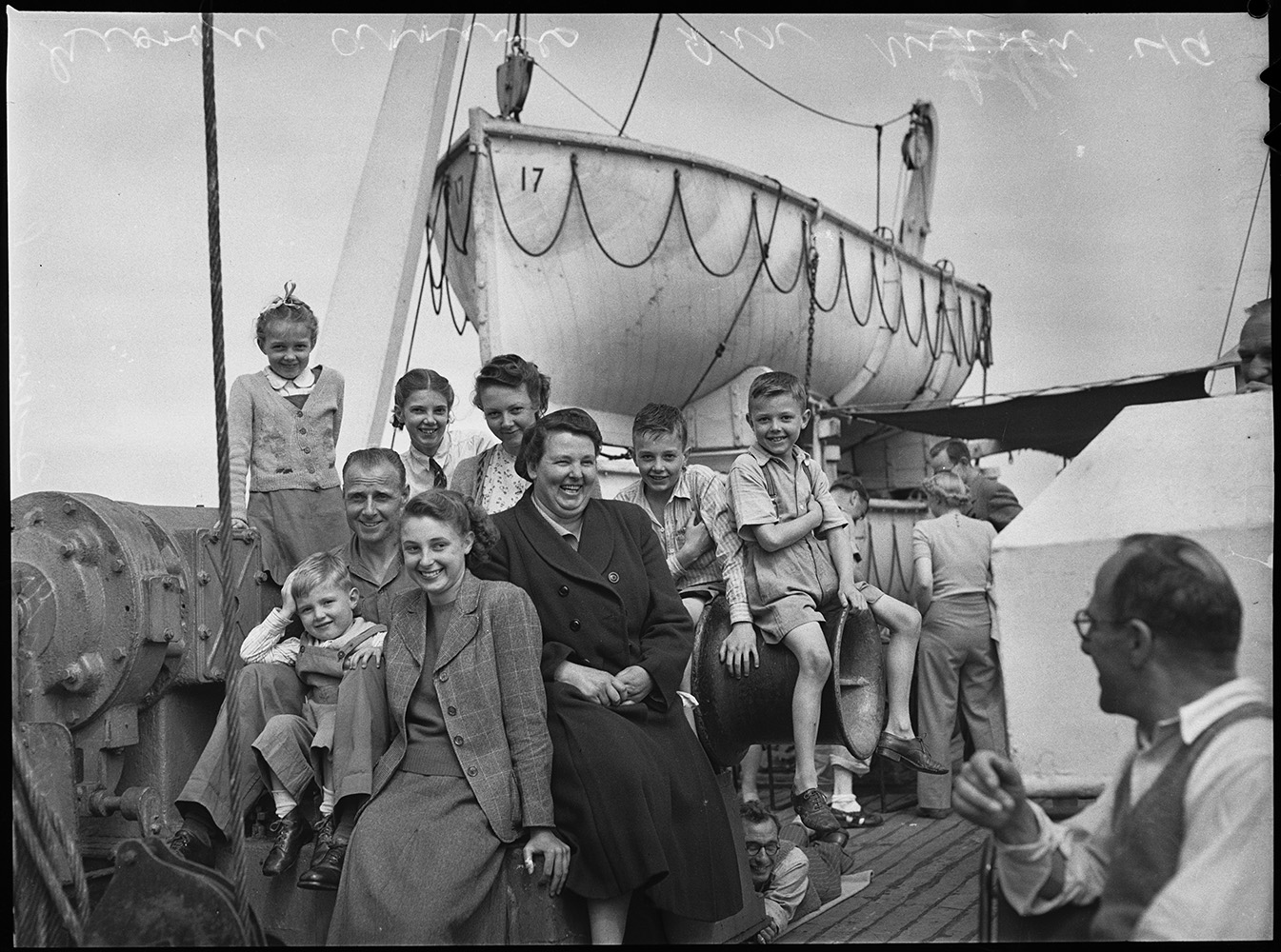
British migrants on the deck of Georgic, Australia, 1949, by Norman Herfort

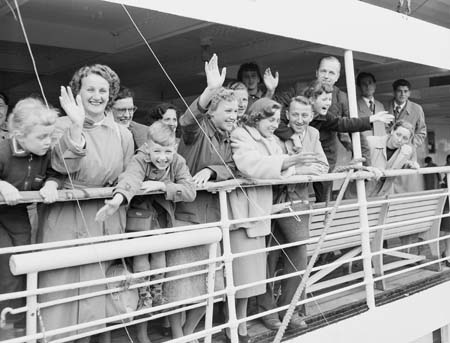
In 1954 the 50,000th Dutch migrant arrived; Maria Scholte is to the right of the picture

After World War II, Australia believed that it must increase its population to avoid the threat of another invasion and launched an immigration program whose goal was to increase Australia's population with the slogan "populate or perish". Hundreds of thousands of displaced Europeans immigrated to Australia with more than three million people immigrating from Europe during the late 1940s until the 1960s. The Immigration Minister, Arthur Calwell, introduced the Assisted Passage Migration Scheme in 1945. The government was still trying to increase Australia's population, especially with people who have skills in the secondary industry sector. As the world was transforming into a more industrial and technological world, Australia needed to keep up.

Australia looked first to Britain for migrants. In the beginning the assisted immigration scheme was popular among young married couples and single people. It was inexpensive, an adventure and an opportunity. After only a year, however, there was a shortage of ships and numbers dropped. The immigration targets were not being met. For the first time, in a revolutionary step for both Australian society and international relations, Australia looked outside Britain for migrants. In 1947, Calwell agreed to bring 12,000 people every year from Estonia, Latvia, Lithuania, and Poland. Many of these people were refugees who were being cared for by the International Refugee Organization (IRO). They were accepted on humanitarian grounds with the condition that they would remain in Australia for two years and work in government selected jobs. 182,159 people were sponsored by the IRO from the end of World War II up to the end of 1954 to resettle in Australia from Europe.

Over the next twenty years, patterns of immigration continued to change. The government encouraged more people to come to Australia and many more assisted agreements were made with countries. In the late 1950s, more immigrants began to be accepted from the Middle East. In 1958, under the Migration Act 1958, the dictation test was removed and a new universal visa scheme or entry permits introduced. This allowed non-Europeans to immigrate. Their entry was now based on what they could contribute to Australia and if it could be shown that they could integrate into Australian society. This attracted many professionals and highly qualified people who added to Australia's relatively small tertiary industry.

The Australian government assisted many of the refugees, such as helping them find work (due to an expanding economy and major infrastructure projects, the Snowy Mountains Scheme being the most famous). This growth of immigration greatly changed the national image regarding the Australian way of life which, before the war, had been dominated by Anglo-Saxons. Immigration was still strict in allowing non-Europeans to immigrate into the country due to the White Australia Policy.

The White Australia Policy began to be abandoned in 1966, under Prime Minister Harold Holt. The last reside of the policy was finally abolished in 1973 under the Government of Gough Whitlam.

== Modern era ==
During the 1970s and 1980s, around 120,000 southern Asian refugees migrated to Australia. During that twenty years, Australia first began to adopt a policy of what Minister of Immigration Al Grassby termed multiculturalism. The development of Australia's multicultural policy was heavily influenced by the Galbally Report of 1978, which addressed issues with living in and planning for a multicultural Australian society.

Migration to Australia in the late twentieth century was influenced by a number of world events, including:

- The fall of Saigon in 1975, the start of migration waves from Indo-China to Western countries and Australia.
- The fall of East Timor to Indonesian's troops in 1975, which led many East-Timorese to seek refuge in Australia.
- Dictatorships in South America, which led political dissidents from Chile, Argentina and Uruguay to flee military regimes during the 1970s and seek refuge in Australia.
- The Lebanese Civil War of 1975–1990, which saw many Lebanese refugees come to Australia.
- Tiananmen Square massacre in June 1989, as a result of which many Chinese students in Australia were granted permanent residency.
- The Yugoslav Wars in the Balkans from 1991 to 2001, which drove many Albanians, Bosnians, Croats, Serbs, to settle in Australia.
- The Jakarta riots of May 1998, which led migrants from Jakarta to trickle into major cities in Australia.

Monthly arrivals of permanent settlers since 1976

In 1994–95, Australia accepted 87,000 immigrants, the last financial year before the Howard government was elected. Planned immigrant intake was reduced to 68,000 following the election of John Howard in 1996.

In 2004–05, Australia accepted 123,000 new settlers, a 40% increase over the past 10 years. The largest number of immigrants (40,000 in 2004/05) moved to Sydney. The majority of immigrants came from Asia, led by China and India. There was also significant growth in student numbers from Asia, and continued high numbers of tourists from Asia. Planned immigrant intake in 2005-06 had more than doubled compared with the intake of 1996.

As at 2007 immigration accounted just over half the overall growth in Australia's population. In New South Wales and South Australia about three-quarters of the population growth could be attributed to immigration. The planned intake for 2007-08 was almost 153,000, plus 13,000 under the humanitarian program and in addition 24,000 New Zealanders were expected to migrate under specific trans-tasman agreement.

Since the 1988 Fitzgerald Inquiry, the quota for skilled and business migrants has risen compared with the quota for family reunions. Refugees that are granted a protection visa are eligible for standard social security benefits such as New start and Rent Assistance.

| Period | Migration Programme |
|---|---|
| 1998–99 | 68,000 |
| 1999–00 | 70,000 |
| 2000–01 | 76,000 |
| 2001–02 | 85,000 |
| 2002–03 | 108,070 |
| 2003–04 | 114,360 |
| 2004–05 | 120,060 |
| 2005 | 142,933 |
| 2006 | 148,200 |
| 2007 | 158,630 |
| 2008 | 171,318 |
| 2011 | 185,000 |
| 2012 | 190,000 |

== Asylum seekers ==
In the early 1990s Australian immigration legislation was changed dramatically, introducing the concept of mandatory detention of unauthorised arrivals, who were popularly referred to as boat people. With a sharp rise in unauthorised boat arrivals in the late 1990s, mostly from war-torn countries such as Iraq and Afghanistan, the Howard government enforced the mandatory detention policy created by the previous Paul Keating government. This came to international attention during the Tampa affair of 2001.

During the 2001 election campaign, immigration and border protection became the hot issue, as a result of incidents such as the Tampa affair, the Children overboard affair, and the sinking of the SIEV-X. This was a major factor contributing to the victory of the Coalition, deemed impossible only a few months earlier, and also marked the beginning of the controversial Pacific Solution.

After the election, the government continued with its hard line on unauthorised arrivals of asylum seekers. Legislation was developed to excise certain islands from Australia's migration zone meaning that if asylum seekers landed on an excised island, Australia was not required to provide access to the Australian courts or permanent settlement. Australia still adheres to its international obligations by considering such refugee applications offshore and providing temporary protection visas to those in genuine need of protection.

By 2004, the number of unauthorised boat arrivals had been reduced dramatically. The government argued that this was the result of its strong policy towards asylum seekers. Others argued that the decrease was the result of global factors, such as changing circumstances in the primary source nations of Afghanistan and Iraq.

== Opposition to immigration ==
In March 1984, Professor Geoffrey Blainey, an Australian historian, made a speech criticizing what he saw as disproportionately high levels of Asian immigration to Australia. Blainey's remarks touched off a flood of debate and controversy about immigration and multiculturalism, known as the 'Blainey debate'. In 1984, he wrote a book outlining his ideas on immigration and multiculturalism titled All for Australia. Blainey remained a persistent critic of multiculturalism throughout the 1980s, claiming multiculturalism was a "sham", "anti-British" and threatened to transform Australia into a "cluster of tribes".

Blainey's views were echoed by some politicians. In August 1988, John Howard, then opposition leader, launched the One Australia policy, stating that he believed the rate of Asian immigration into Australia should be slowed for the sake of social cohesion. He stated: "I do believe that if it is – in the eyes of some in the community – that it's too great, it would be in our immediate-term interest and supporting of social cohesion if it were slowed down a little, so the capacity of the community to absorb it was greater."

In her maiden speech to the House of Representatives after her election in 1996, Pauline Hanson expressed her concern that Australia "was in danger of being swamped by Asians". This message exposed a population deeply divided on the issue of immigration. Hanson went on to form the One Nation Party, which subsequently won nearly one quarter of the vote in Queensland state elections. Hanson claimed government policies were favoring migrants (multiculturalism) and indigenous Australians. The issue of immigration remains highly sensitive in Australia.

A 2018, Lowy Institute Poll found that a majority of Australians oppose the current rate of immigration to Australia. In 2018, 54% of Australians say that ‘the total number of migrants coming to Australia each year is too high’. A minority say it's ‘too low’ (14%). These results represent a significant rise in opposition to the existing migration rate – up 14 points since last year, and up 17 points since we first asked this question in 2014. Immigration to Australia came to a halt during the COVID-19 pandemic, which in turn saw a shrinkage of the Australian population for the first time since World War I.

== See also ==
- Demographics of Australia
- Europeans in Oceania
- History of Australia
- Immigration to Australia
- 457 visa (1996-2018)
