= Asian immigration to Australia =

Immigration of Asian nationals to Australia

Asian immigration to Australia refers to immigration to Australia from part of the continent of Asia, which includes East Asia, Southeast Asia, and South Asia.The first major wave of Asian immigration to Australia occurred in the late 19th century, but the exclusionary White Australia policy, which was implemented to restrict non-European immigration, made it difficult for many Asian immigrants to migrate to the country. However, with the passage of the Migration Act 1958, the White Australia policy began to be phased out and Asian immigration to Australia increased significantly. Today, Asian immigrants from a wide range of countries play an important role in the cultural and economic landscape of Australia.

== History ==
=== Early immigration, 2300–2000 BCE ===
A study of Indigenous Australian DNA has found that Indigenous Australians may have mixed with people of Indian origin about 4,200 years ago, around 2000 BCE. This is supported by evidence of flint tools and Indian dogs being introduced from India at this time, as well as changes in tool technology and food processing in the Australian archaeological record.

There are two theories for this migration of genes from India to Australia. One theory is that some Indians had contact with people in Indonesia, who eventually transferred those genes from India to Aboriginal Australians. The other theory is that a group of Indians migrated directly from India to Australia and intermingled with the locals. This mixed ancestry may also explain the facial similarities between the Vedda people of Sri Lanka and Australo-Melanesians, as both groups share ancestry with Andamanese aborigines and Indo-Aryan migrants. It is now clear that this mixed ancestry also includes Dravidians, as the Andamanese people also intermixed with the now extinct Elamites.

=== Pre-colonial era, 1627–1787 CE ===
It is also known that northern Aboriginal Australians had interactions with ethnic Chinese traders, though the extent of these interactions is debated. The first recorded link between China and Australia occurred during the establishment of the Colony of New South Wales. Three ships of the First Fleet, Scarborough, Charlotte and Lady Penrhyn, sailed to Canton after depositing their convicts in the colony to purchase tea and other Chinese goods to sell on their return to Britain. Seamen from eastern Indonesian ports such as Kupang and Makassar also visited Australia's northern coast, collecting trepang or sea cucumber to trade with China. Although they did not settle in Australia, some of these seamen took Indigenous wives and their descendants can be found in many north coast populations today.

=== Colonial era, 1788-1900 CE ===
==== Indian immigration to Australia ====
The first Indians arrived in Australia with the British settlers who established a new colony in 1788. These people included seamen, marines, their families, government officials, and convicts, including women and children. Many of these convicts were from other parts of Great Britain, including Ireland, and about 1% were from the British outposts in India and Canada, Maoris from New Zealand, Chinese from Hong Kong, and slaves from the Caribbean. Between 1788 and 1868, approximately 164,000 convicts were transported to the Australian colonies on 806 ships, some of which stopped in India on their journey.

==== Malay immigration to Australia ====
Malay labourers were brought to Australia to work in the copra, sugarcane, pearl diving, and trepang industries. The Cocos Islands saw the arrival of Malays as slaves under Alexander Hare in 1826, but they were later employed as coconut harvesters for copra. Ajoup, a 22-year-old Malay convict, may have been the first Malay immigrant to Australia, arriving in Sydney on 11 January 1837. Ajoup was sentenced in Cape Town, South Africa, to 14 years transportation to New South Wales, and received his ticket of leave (i.e. his freedom) in the colony in 1843.

=== Indentured Labour, 1848–1853 ===
==== Chinese Immigrants ====
Between 1848 and 1853, over 3,000 Chinese workers on labour contracts arrived in Sydney for employment in the New South Wales countryside. There was resistance to this cheap labour due to racist opposition towards the ethnicity of the Chinese immigrants. Some Chinese immigrants stayed for the duration of their contracts and then returned home, but there is evidence that others spent the rest of their lives in New South Wales, marrying and starting families. The British government often overruled attempts by the Australian colonies to exclude Chinese immigration to avoid upsetting the Qing dynasty.

==== Indian Immigrants ====
In the late 1830s, more Indians began to arrive in Australia as indentured labourers when the transportation of convicts to New South Wales slowed down and eventually stopped altogether in 1840. The demand for foreign labour increased, and this was partially filled by the arrival of Indians who had an agrarian background in India and were able to fulfill tasks as farm labourers on cane fields and shepherds on sheep stations. In 1844, P. Friell brought 25 domestic workers from India to Sydney, including a few women and children. A census from 1861 shows that there were around 200 Indians in Victoria, 20 of which were in Ballarat. Many more Indians came to Australia and worked as hawkers, traveling from town to town and selling a variety of products.

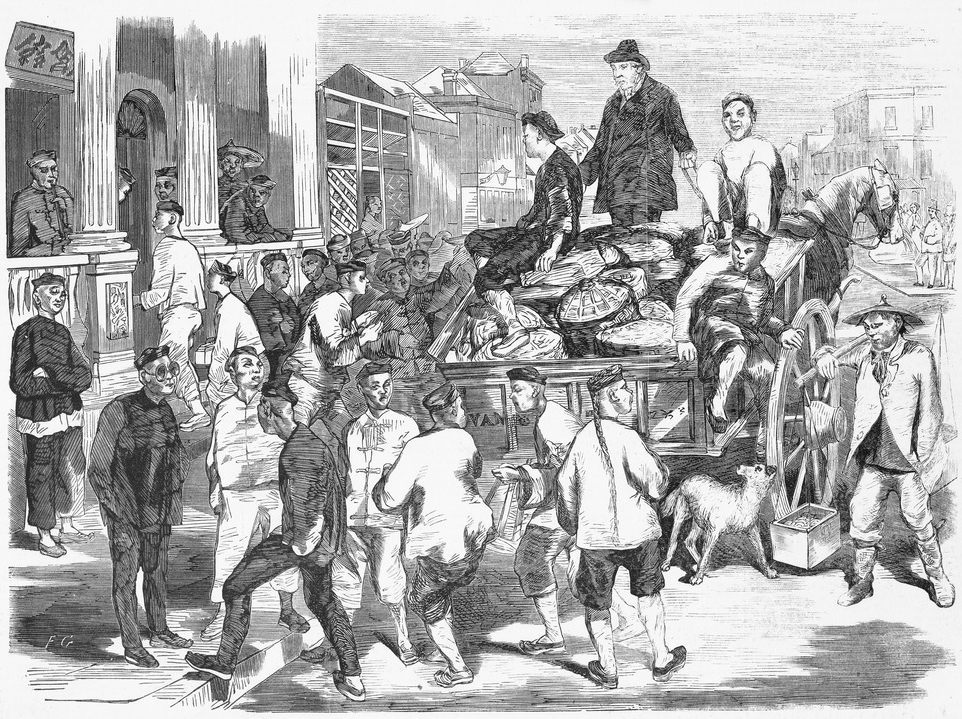
Chinese immigrants arriving in Melbourne's Chinatown, located on Little Bourke Street, 1866

=== Gold rush, 1850s–1860s ===
==== Singaporean Immigrants ====
Singaporean migration to Australia began during the gold rush period, which took place in the 1850s and 1860s. At the time, both Singapore and Australia were British colonies, so movement between the two territories was relatively common.

==== Pre-federation Chinese migration ====
The gold rush period of the 1850s and 1860s saw the largest pre-federation Chinese migration to Australia, with numbers peaking around 40,000. In 1857 alone, around 15,000 Chinese immigrants arrived in the first half of the year. That same year restrictions were put on Chinese migration into Australia due to lobbying and anti-Chinese sentiment. These numbers were only reached again after the abolition of the White Australia policy in 1973. Gold was found at several places in Australia in 1851, but significant Chinese migration to join the diggers only began late in 1853.

==== Origins of Chinese immigrants ====
Most of the people who came to Australia for the gold rush were from Guangdong. The Californian Gold Rush had been known as "old gold mountain" to the Chinese of Guangdong. The Australian rush was known as "new gold mountain". Chinese immigrants to Australia left such conditions as overpopulation, the declining power of the Qing dynasty, the devastation caused by the Taiping Rebellion, and the local Canton Hakka-Punti Clan Wars. These issues impacted many parts of China, but immigrants to California and the Australian colonies came mainly from the counties most proximate to the port of Hong Kong.

==== Method of travel and demographics of Chinese immigrants ====
The average voyage from Canton via Hong Kong to Sydney and Melbourne took about 3 months. It was a profitable exercise for the ship masters, and the more Chinese passengers they could fit on board, the more money they could make from the passage fares. These fares were often paid through a system of debt to clan leaders and/or to agents who accompanied them on the ship. Such methods of travel were known as credit-tickets. However, some Chinese were able to pay their own way. These were often the wealthier city-born men who were coming to Australia to be merchants or work in an industry other than gold mining. From 1853 to 1855, thousands of Chinese disembarked in Melbourne and headed for the goldfields.

Very few Chinese women came to Australia during this period. In 1861, at least 38,000 Chinese people lived in the Australian colonies with the vast majority being men. On the goldfields in Bendigo in 1861 there were 5,367 Chinese men and only one Chinese woman. By 1861, there were around 40,000 Chinese people living in Australia, constituting 3.3% of the total population.

=== Late 19th century, 1860s–1901 ===
==== Indians in Outback Australia, 1860s–1901 ====
In the late 19th century, Indians, many of whom were Sikh, worked as merchants, industrialists, and businessmen throughout outback Australia, establishing themselves as "pioneers of the inland". According to the 1881 census, there were 998 people born in India living in Australia, a number that had grown to over 1,700 by 1891.

==== Cameleers, 1860s–1900 ====
During the period from the 1860s to 1900, small groups of cameleers, mostly from British India but also from Afghanistan, Egypt, and Turkey, were shipped in and out of Australia on three-year contracts to service the inland pastoral industry. These workers, who were commonly referred to as "Afghans" or "Ghans", were responsible for carting goods and transporting wool bales by camel train. Most of the cameleers were Muslims, with a sizeable minority being Sikhs from the Punjab region. They established camel-breeding stations and rest house outposts, known as caravanserai, throughout inland Australia, creating a permanent link between the coastal cities and remote cattle and sheep grazing stations. This practice continued until around the 1930s, when the cameleers were largely replaced by automobiles.

==== Indonesians in Australia, 1870s–1901 ====
Beginning in the 1870s, Indonesian workers were recruited to work in colonial Australia, with almost 1,000 (primarily in Western Australia and Queensland) residing in the country by the time of federation in 1901. The pearl hunting industry in northern and western Australia predominantly recruited workers from Kupang, while sugar plantations in Queensland recruited migrant labourers from Java. According to the 1871 colonial census, 149 Malays were working in Australia as pearl divers, labourers in South Australian mines, and on Queensland's sugar plantations. By 1921, the number of Malay pearl divers in Australia had grown to 1,860. However, the Immigration Restriction Act 1901 significantly curtailed the growth of this community.

==== Japanese in Australia, Late 19th century – early 20th century ====
The first recorded Japanese migrant to Australia settled in the country in 1871. But it was not until the 1880s, following the lifting of restrictions, that Japanese immigration to Australia began in earnest.

=== Immigration Restriction Act 1901 and White Australia Policy, 1901–1973 ===
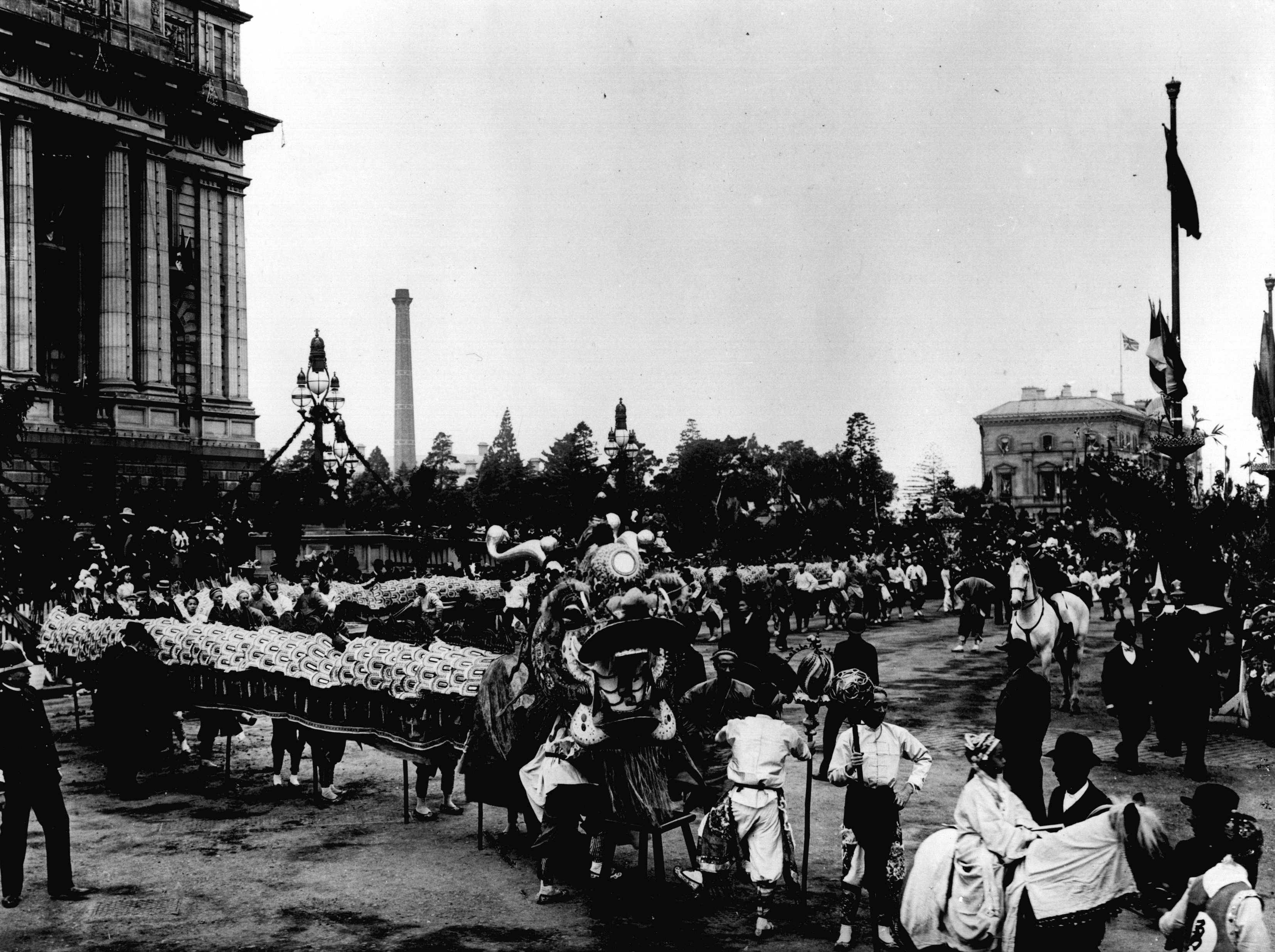
Chinese Australians took part in parades to celebrate Federation in Melbourne 1901

The Immigration Restriction Act 1901, also known as the "White Australia policy," was one of the first pieces of legislation passed following the establishment of the Commonwealth of Australia on 1 January 1901. This policy placed restrictions on non-European immigration and made it difficult for Asian immigrants to migrate to Australia. The act required that all migrants pass a European language dictation test to remain in the country, which most Asian immigrants were unable to pass due to the discretion of immigration officials. The White Australia policy was intended to keep Australia predominantly white, with 98% of the population being white at the time. In 1958, the requirement to pass the dictation test was removed, and the Racial Discrimination Act 1975 effectively ended the White Australia policy by allowing for more Asian immigration to Australia.

==== Korean immigration to Australia ====
There is evidence of a small number of Koreans in Australia as early as 1920. While it is unclear what prompted their arrival, they may have been the children of Australian Protestant missionaries who began work in Korea around 1885. A few also came to Australia between 1921 and 1941 for education. However, overall, Korean immigration was limited due to the restrictive immigration policies of the time.

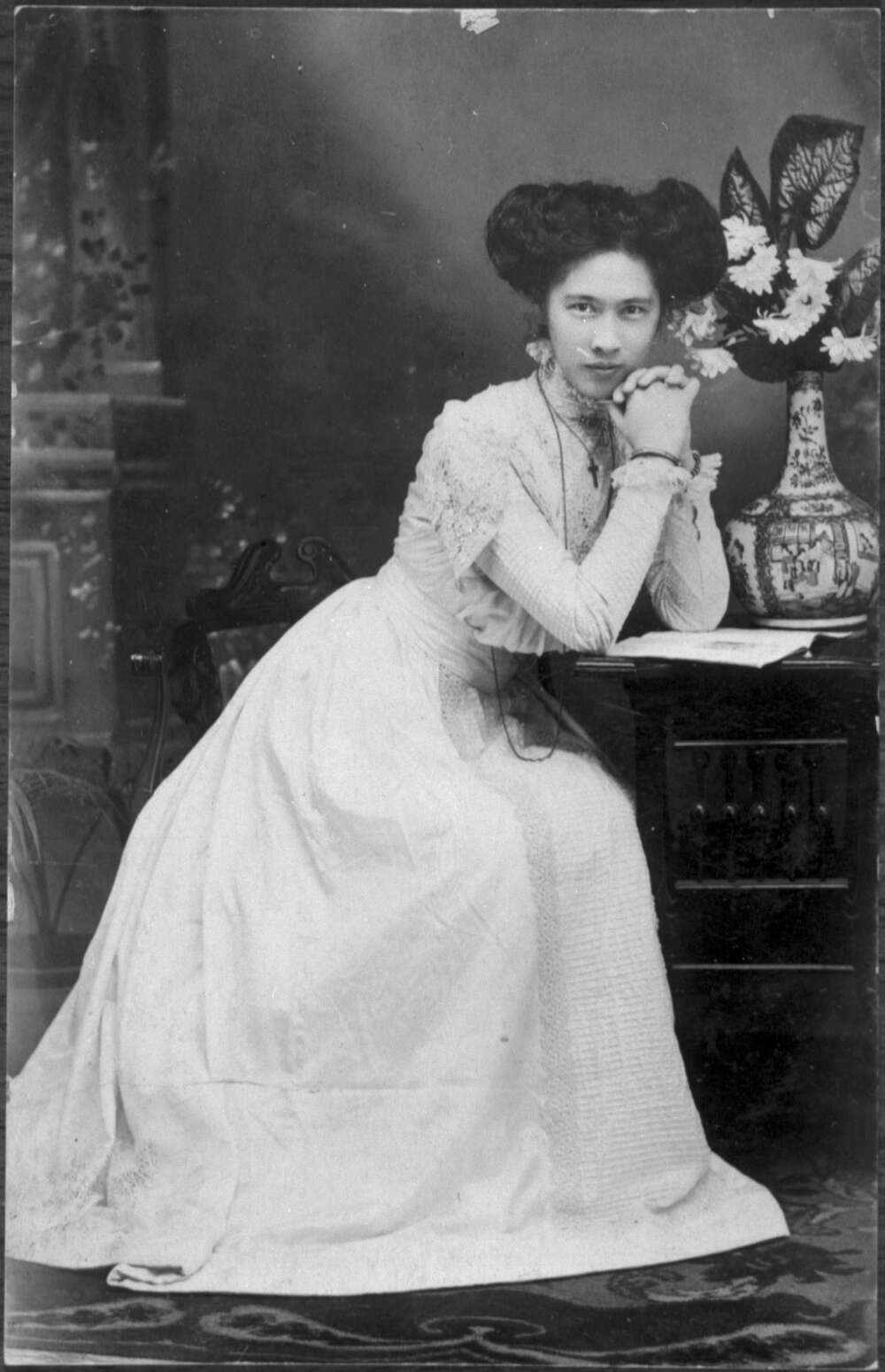
Portrait of Maud Shing, 1907

==== Chinese Australians in the 20th century ====
During the 20th century, over 200 people with Chinese heritage fought for Australia in World War I and a similar number fought in World War II. During the inter-war period, Australian-born people of Chinese background began to outnumber Chinese-born people in Australia for the first time. The anti-Japanese War also helped inspire the development of organizations focused on China and aimed at making Australians aware of the danger of Japan and the need to assist China.

==== Thai immigration to Australia ====
The first notable Thai to arrive in Australia was Butra Mahintra, sent by King Rama VI during the early 1920s to purchase racehorses. In the 1960s, a small number of Thai students came to study in Australia, and in the 1970s, a larger number of Thai people migrated to Australia as the result of political turmoil in Thailand.

==== Japanese immigration to Australia ====
Japanese immigration to Australia began in the 1880s, following the lifting of restrictions. The Immigration Restriction Act 1901 temporarily prevented further Japanese migration to Australia, but subsequent exemptions to the dictation test were applied to Japanese people, mitigating these restrictions. In Australia, many Japanese migrants worked as pearlers in northern Australia or in the sugar cane industry.

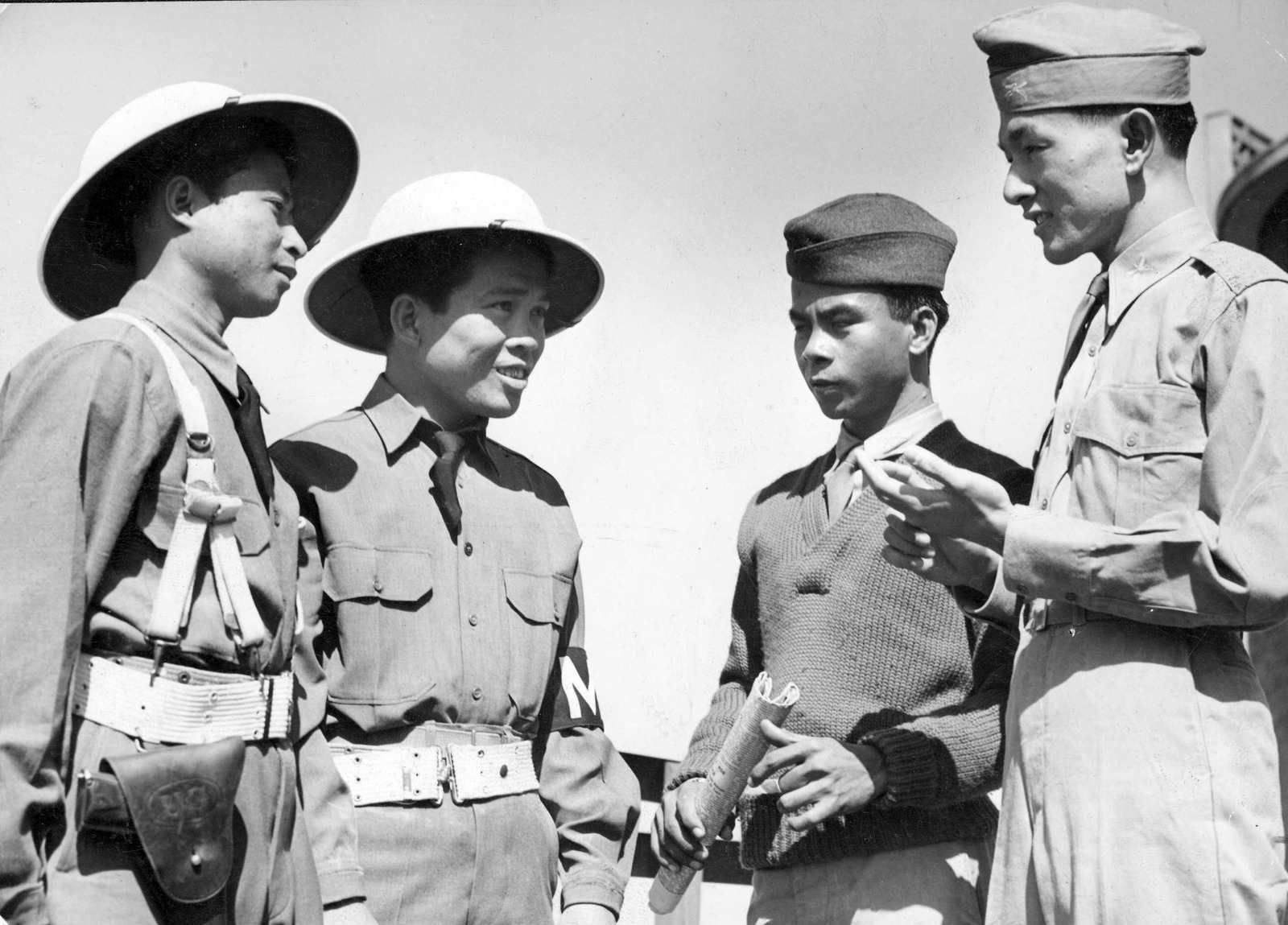
Filipino soldiers in Victoria, World War II

=== World War II, 1941–1945 ===
==== Japanese internment ====
During World War II, Japanese civilians living in Australia were interned for up to six years. This included 1141 Japanese living in Australia and an additional 3160 Japanese civilians arrested in allied countries across the Asia-Pacific region. An unknown number of Koreans were also arrested as Japanese and interned. The internment of Japanese in Australia was more racial than political, with Japanese being "evacuated" from their hometowns "for their own good" (ie, to prevent racist attacks against them by non-Japanese). After the war, all ethnic-Japanese internees who did not possess Australian nationality were repatriated to Occupied Japan, while all ethnic-Formosans were repatriated to Occupied Formosa.

==== Immigration from Southeast Asia ====
Thousands of Indonesians fled the Japanese occupation of the Dutch East Indies and took refuge in Australia. Exact landing statistics were not kept, but after the war, 3,768 repatriated to Indonesia on Australian government-provided ships.

East Timorese immigration to Australia also began during World War II, with the arrival of the first migrants from Portuguese Timor in 1943. This migration wave consisted of approximately 600 people who were evacuated from the island, with only 35 settling permanently after the war ended.

Taiwanese Australians have had a significant presence in Tatura and Rushworth, two neighbouring towns in Victoria. During World War II, Taiwanese civilians were interned in "Internment Camp No. 4" in Rushworth, along with Japanese civilians from the Southeast Asia and the Pacific region. Most of the Japanese and Taiwanese civilians were innocent and had been arrested for racist reasons. Several Japanese and Taiwanese people were born in the internment camp and received British (Australian) birth certificates from a nearby hospital.

==== Forced relocation of Chinese Australians in Darwin ====
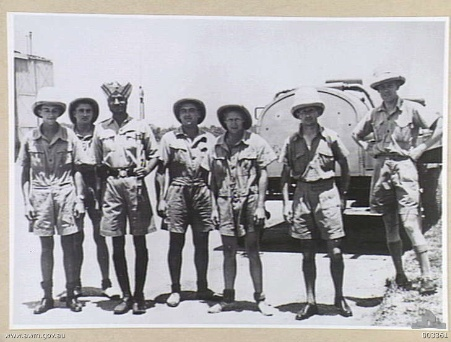
RAAF Personnel with an Indian Sikh man during WWII.

During WWII, the Chifley government passed the Darwin Lands Acquisition Act 1945, which compulsorily acquired 53 acres of land owned by Chinese Australians in Darwin. This effectively ended the local Chinatown and led to the forced relocation of its residents. The administrator of the Northern Territory, Aubrey Abbott, had written to the Department of the Interior in 1943 proposing the removal of "undesirable elements" from Darwin, stating that the compulsory acquisition and conversion to leasehold would "entirely prevent the Chinese quarter forming again". The civilian population of the territory had been largely evacuated during the war, and when the former Chinatown residents returned, they found their homes and businesses had been reduced to rubble.

=== Post-war immigration ===
The government began to expand access to citizenship for non-Europeans in 1957 by allowing access to 15-year residents, and in 1958 by reforming entry permits via the Migration Act 1958. In March 1966, the immigration ministry began a policy of allowing the immigration of skilled and professional non-Europeans, and of expanding the availability of temporary residency to these groups. These cumulatively had the effect of increasing immigration numbers from non-European countries. In 1973, prime minister Gough Whitlam took steps to dismantle the White Australia and to bring about a more non-discriminatory immigration policy—temporarily bringing down overall immigration numbers. The eventual evolution of immigration policy has been along a trajectory of non-discrimination, dismantling European-only policies, and the broadening of pathways to citizenship for Asians.

==== Repatriation of Japanese and Taiwanese Internees ====
Following the end of World War II in 1945, the Australian government implemented a policy of repatriation for Japanese internees, sending them back to Occupied Japan. However, Japanese Australians were generally allowed to remain in the country. In contrast, Taiwanese internees, many of whom originated from the Netherlands East Indies, were repatriated to Occupied Taiwan. This decision led to public outrage and the "Yoizuki Hellship scandal," as the conditions on the repatriation ship were seen as inhumane. There was also debate about the citizenship of Taiwanese internees, as some were born in Australia and therefore technically British subjects, but many were deported along with their non-citizen parents.

==== Migration from Dutch East Indies (Indonesia) ====
In the 1950s around 10,000 people from the former Dutch East Indies, who held Dutch citizenship and had previously settled in the Netherlands, migrated to Australia, bypassing the White Australia policy. In the late 1990s, many Chinese Indonesians began migrating to Australia as well, fleeing political and economic turmoil in Indonesia following the May 1998 riots and the fall of Suharto.

==== Transfer of Christmas Island and Cocos (Keeling) Islands from Singapore to Australia ====
In 1955 and 1958, the territories of Christmas Island and the Cocos (Keeling) Islands were transferred from Singapore to Australia, leading to the establishment of Singaporean Australian citizenship. This decision was met with opposition from some members of the Singaporean legislature, who felt that they were not properly consulted on the matter. However, the British government, which still managed Singapore's foreign affairs at the time, ultimately transferred the islands to Australia after addressing certain concerns about citizenship and employment for the islanders.

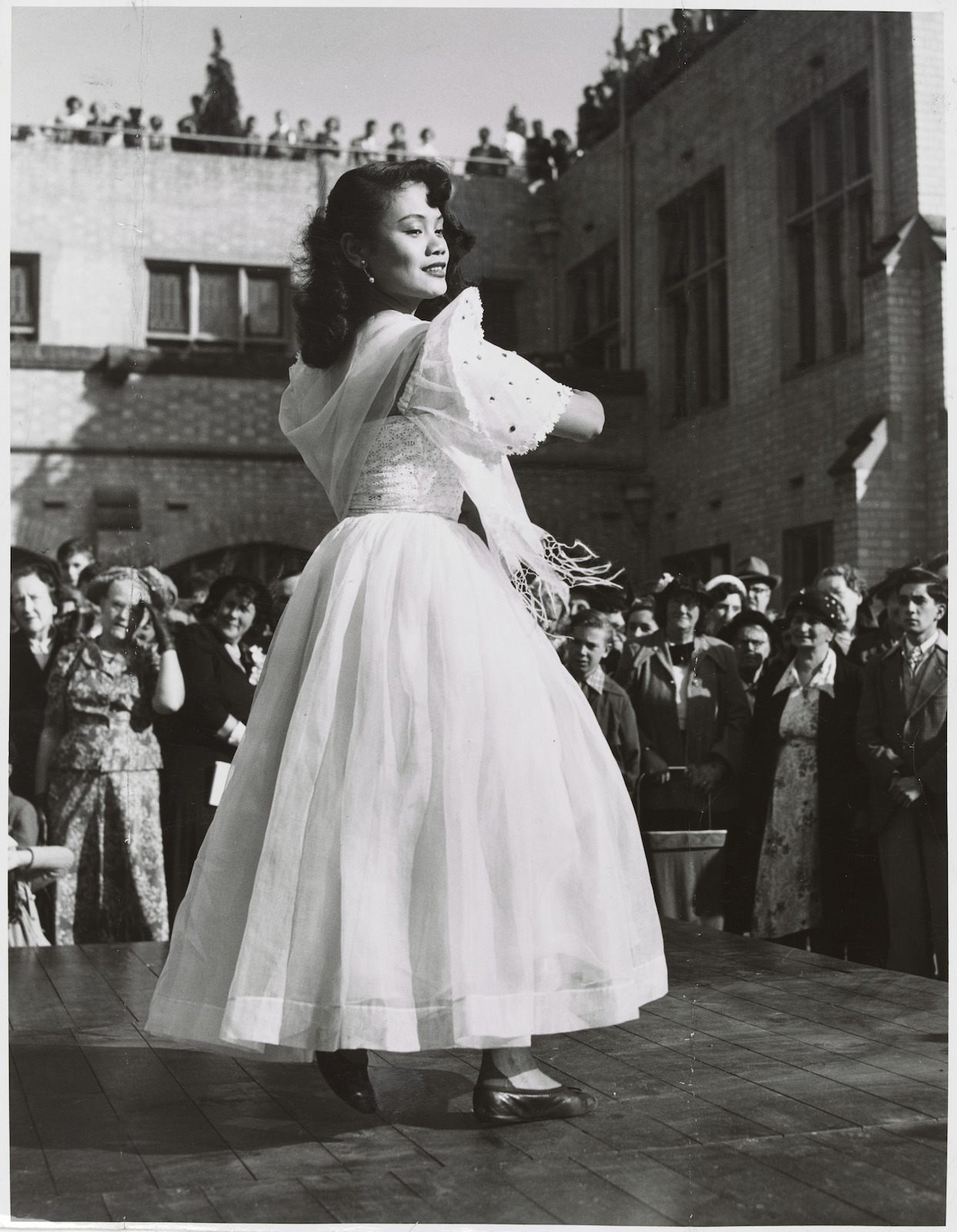
Overseas students studying in Australia, 1949–1954

===== The Colombo Plan =====
In 1950 the Australian government established the Colombo Plan, a program that sponsored Asian students to study or train in Australian tertiary institutions. The goal of the plan was to improve relations between Asian countries and Australia and to combat communism in Asia. Students from developing countries were brought to Australia for education and were expected to return to their home countries to use their newly acquired skills and knowledge to benefit their communities.

Through the Colombo Plan a small number of Laotians came to Australia, primarily as students. Prior to 1975, around 150 people of Laotian descent lived in Australia, and by the beginning of 1975, there were over 600 Indochinese students in the country.

Malaysians also came to Australia to study under the Colombo Plan, with many choosing to stay in the country after graduation. The end of the Immigration Restriction Act in 1973 also contributed to an increase in the number of Malaysians in Australia. As Malaysia's prosperity grew, more students came to Australia as self-financed students.

Between 1954 and 1989, approximately 450 Thai students traveled to Australia through the Colombo Plan. Most did not permanently settle in Australia, but their time in the country increased awareness of Australia in Thailand. Between the 1950s and 1970s, the majority of new arrivals from Thailand in Australia were students, as well as spouses of Australians and those sponsored under military traineeships.

=== Phasing out of exclusionary policies: 1960s ===
During the 1960s Australia saw a significant shift in its immigration policies with the phasing out of the exclusionary White Australia policy. This change made Australia a more attractive destination for immigrants from Asia, including Singaporean students who were drawn to the country due to its proximity. The end of the Korean War also brought Korean war brides and orphaned children to Australia, who were adopted by Australian families.

In 1969 the first Korean immigrants arrived in Sydney under the Skilled Migration Program, and by the time of the 1971 Census, there were 468 Korean-born individuals living in Australia. The end of the White Australia policy also saw the arrival of new immigrants from the Chinese Diaspora, including refugees from Vietnam and Cambodia in the 1970s and economic immigrants from Hong Kong and Taiwan in the 1980s and 1990s. These immigrants often settled in capital cities, and their arrival led to the establishment of new institutions and the revival of old ones, as well as the publication of Chinese language newspapers in capital cities.

During this time assimilation became the dominant policy in Australia, leading to the extension of rights and gradual changes to citizenship laws. Cafes replaced market gardens as the major source of employment for immigrants, both legal and illegal. These changes, along with the increase in Australian-born Chinese individuals, the return of domiciles, and the arrival of Chinese students under the Colombo Plan, marked the end of South China's dominance in the link between China and Australia that had lasted for nearly 100 years.

=== Mass migration of Asian refugees to Australia: 1970–80s ===
In the 1970s and 1980s Australia experienced a significant influx of refugees from various Asian countries. This mass migration was driven by a number of factors, including war, political instability, and economic hardship. Among the events that contributed to this mass migration were the Indonesian invasion of East Timor, the abolition of the Kingdom of Laos in 1975, the declaration of martial law in the Philippines, and the Soviet–Afghan War. Despite facing challenges and discrimination, these refugees made significant contributions to Australian society and helped to shape the country's multicultural identity.

The Convention Relating to the Status of Refugees, adopted by the United Nations in 1951, also played a role in the mass migration of Asian refugees to Australia. This convention defines the rights of refugees and sets out the obligations of states to protect them. Many of the refugees who arrived in Australia in the 1970s and 1980s were able to seek asylum under the provisions of this convention.

=== Re-migration and multiculturalism: 1990s ===
The 1990s saw the trend of migration becoming less permanent, with people moving back and forth between different countries. Students and academics were among those who followed this pattern, with many Asian immigrants returning to their home countries after completing their studies in Australia. The 1990s also saw the continuation of multiculturalism in Australia, with a variety of Asian cultural institutions, media outlets, and community organizations established to support the growing Asian immigrant populations.

In addition, the process of becoming an Australian citizen was less stringent compared to other countries, which motivated many Lao people to take up citizenship. The Citizenship Act in Australia allowed immigrants to become citizens with only two years of residence in the country, provided they had basic English proficiency skills. The act was amended in 1984 to provide exemption to individuals over 50 applying for citizenship, recognizing the difficulty for older individuals in learning English. As a result, the majority of Lao people who settled in Australia were able to attain citizenship within their first three years in the country. During this time period, more than three-quarters of Lao refugees became Australian citizens, compared to 65% of Cambodians and 63% of Vietnamese refugees. This trend reflects the relative ease of obtaining citizenship for Lao immigrants in Australia compared to other countries.

After the Tienanmen Square massacre of 1989, the Australian Government allowed students from mainland China to settle in Australia permanently. This decision contributed to an increase in immigration to Australia from both mainland China and Taiwan in the 1990s. Many Asian Australians made significant contributions to their new home, with many holding leadership positions in government, business, and other areas of public life. In the 1990s, Chinese immigrants became the third largest group among immigrants to Australia.

The Singaporean community in Australia saw significant growth in the 1990s, with many students choosing to study in the country. By 1998, the population of Singaporeans in Australia was estimated to be around 35,933 people. To support these communities, a number of Singaporean clubs and associations were established across the country.

There was a further increase in Korean immigration to Australia, with many coming under the skilled and business migration categories. By the end of the decade, more than half of the Korea-born population in Australia had arrived in the previous ten years.

Vietnam-born immigrants surpassed those arriving as refugees, with many coming under the family reunion and skilled and business migration categories. By 2000, the percentage of Vietnam-born immigrants reached 93% of the total intake of Vietnam-born arriving in Australia.

=== New waves of Asian immigration: 2000–present ===
In the 21st century, Australia has seen a boom in migration from Asia, particularly from countries such as India, China, the Philippines, and Singapore. In just twenty years, from 1996 to 2016 the percentage of the Australian population that was born in an Asian country grew from 5.5% to 13.4%. Many of these immigrants are skilled professionals, including doctors, nurses, IT specialists, and engineers, who have come to work in Australia. Indian immigrants are the largest migrant ethnic group in Melbourne and Adelaide, and are likely to become the second largest in Sydney by 2021. The Indian-born population has seen major growth from 78,000 to 455,000 in the years between 1996 and 2016. Chinese immigrants, on the other hand, are predominantly female and are concentrated in Melbourne's Docklands, Footscray, Sunshine, and Tarneit suburbs, as well as Sydney's Parramatta and neighboring suburbs.

In recent years, there has also been an explosion in the number of immigrants from China, which have frequently been Australia's largest source of new immigrants since 2000. Between 1996 and 2016 China born immigrants grew by over 400,000 in Australia and in 2015–2016, China (excluding Hong Kong and Macau) was the second largest source of immigrants to Australia, behind India. As a result, China (excluding Hong Kong, Macau, and Taiwan) is now the third largest foreign birthplace for Australian residents, after England and New Zealand.

Other Asian communities in Australia have also seen significant growth in the 21st century. The Singaporean community in Australia has grown from 43,070 in 2005 to 53,550 in 2010, and the Indonesian-born population in Victoria is estimated to be 17,806 as of 2016. These new waves of Asian immigration have resulted in 26% of the births in 2016 having at least one Asian born parent.

== Opposition to immigration ==
=== 1970s ===
In the late 1970s, The Australian National Alliance and Progressive Conservative Party were founded. They had anti-Asian immigration politics. These party's would fold in the early 1980s.

=== 1980s ===
In March 1984, Professor Geoffrey Blainey, an Australian historian, made a speech criticizing what he saw as disproportionately high levels of Asian immigration to Australia. Blainey's remarks touched off a flood of debate and controversy about immigration and multiculturalism, known as the 'Blainey debate'. In 1984, he wrote a book outlining his ideas on immigration and multiculturalism titled All for Australia. Blainey remained a persistent critic of multiculturalism throughout the 1980s, claiming multiculturalism was a "sham", "anti-British" and threatened to transform Australia into a "cluster of tribes".

In August 1988, Liberal Leader of the Opposition John Howard said that the rate of Asian immigration to Australia should be reduced in what would be called the One Australia policy. On the ABC PM program, Howard discussed the policy in relation to Asian immigration to Australia:

I do believe that if it is – in the eyes of some in the community – that it's too great, it would be in our immediate-term interest and supporting of social cohesion if it were slowed down a little, so the capacity of the community to absorb it was greater.

Howard's Shadow Finance Minister, John Stone from the National Party, elaborated, saying that "Asian immigration has to be slowed. It's no use dancing around the bushes". Ian Sinclair, National Party leader in the Coalition, also supported the policy, saying:

"What we are saying is that if there is any risk of an undue build-up of Asians as against others in the community, then you need to control it ... I certainly believe, that at the moment we need ... to reduce the number of Asians ... We don't want the divisions of South Africa, we don't want the divisions of London. We really don't want the colour divisions of the United States."

=== 1990s ===
Senator Pauline Hanson, in her 1998 maiden speech to Parliament called for the abolition of multiculturalism and said that "reverse racism" was being applied to "mainstream Australians" who were not entitled to the same welfare and government funding as minority groups. She has said that Australia was in danger of being "swamped by Asians", and that these immigrants "have their own culture and religion, form ghettos and do not assimilate". She was widely accused of racism.

== See also ==
- Asian Australians
- History of Asian Australians
- History of immigration to Australia
- Immigration history and patterns of Asian ethnic groups in Australia
  - Chinese Australians
  - Indian Australians
  - Filipino Australians
  - Vietnamese Australians
- Asian immigration to the United States
- Asian immigration to the United Kingdom
