= Radio Tarana =

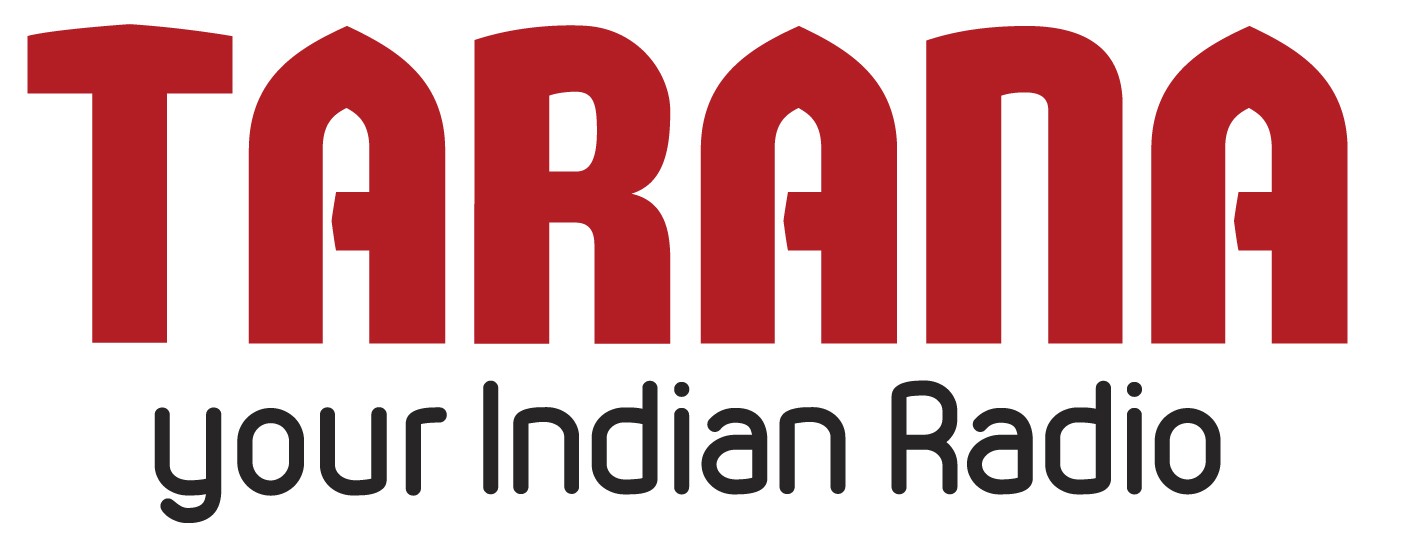

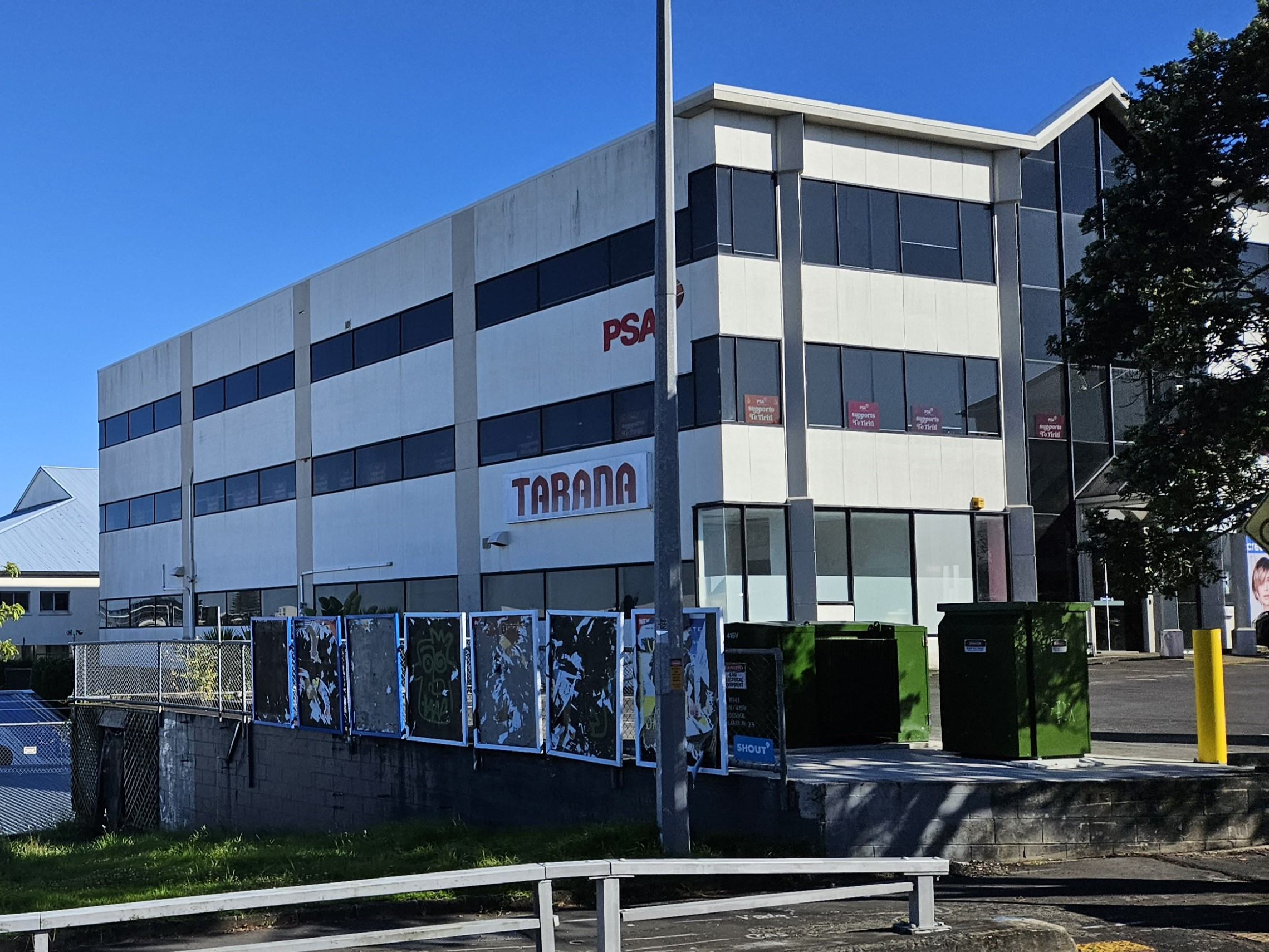
- Radio Tarana headquarters in Eden Terrace, Auckland
- New Zealand
- Broadcast area: New Zealand
- Frequency: Auckland: 1386 AM

History
- First air date: 1996

Technical information
- Transmitter coordinates: 36°50′56.7″S 174°37′46.9″E

Links
- Webcast: Live stream
- Website: tarana.co.nz

Radio Tarana is a New Zealand radio network, broadcasting in Auckland. It broadcasts a mixture of music, information, news, sports, culture, events coverage and lifestyle features. The station was the first commercial full-time New Zealand radio station targeting migrant communities. According to the 2014 TNS New Zealand radio survey, it remains the highest-rating ethnic broadcaster in the country.

Robert Khan set up the station in 1996 for Auckland's Indian and Hindi-speaking community. It now targets a broad range of Indian, Pakistani, Bangladeshi, Sri Lankan and Fijian migrants around New Zealand. The network aims to foster mutual understanding between different migrant groups with diverse interests, religions and ethnic origins. This is done in part through the coverage of religious festivals, international news events and local political issues.

Tarana broadcasts in Auckland on 1386 AM, reaching a weekly audience of 32,000 in the Auckland market during a survey in 2014. Radio agency The Radio Bureau claims these listeners have "significant spending capacity" and "high disposable incomes". With nationwide coverage through online streaming, digital radio, mobile devices, satellite radio and an estimated 22,000 weekly web browsers, it claims to reach a total audience based on about 80,000.

== History ==
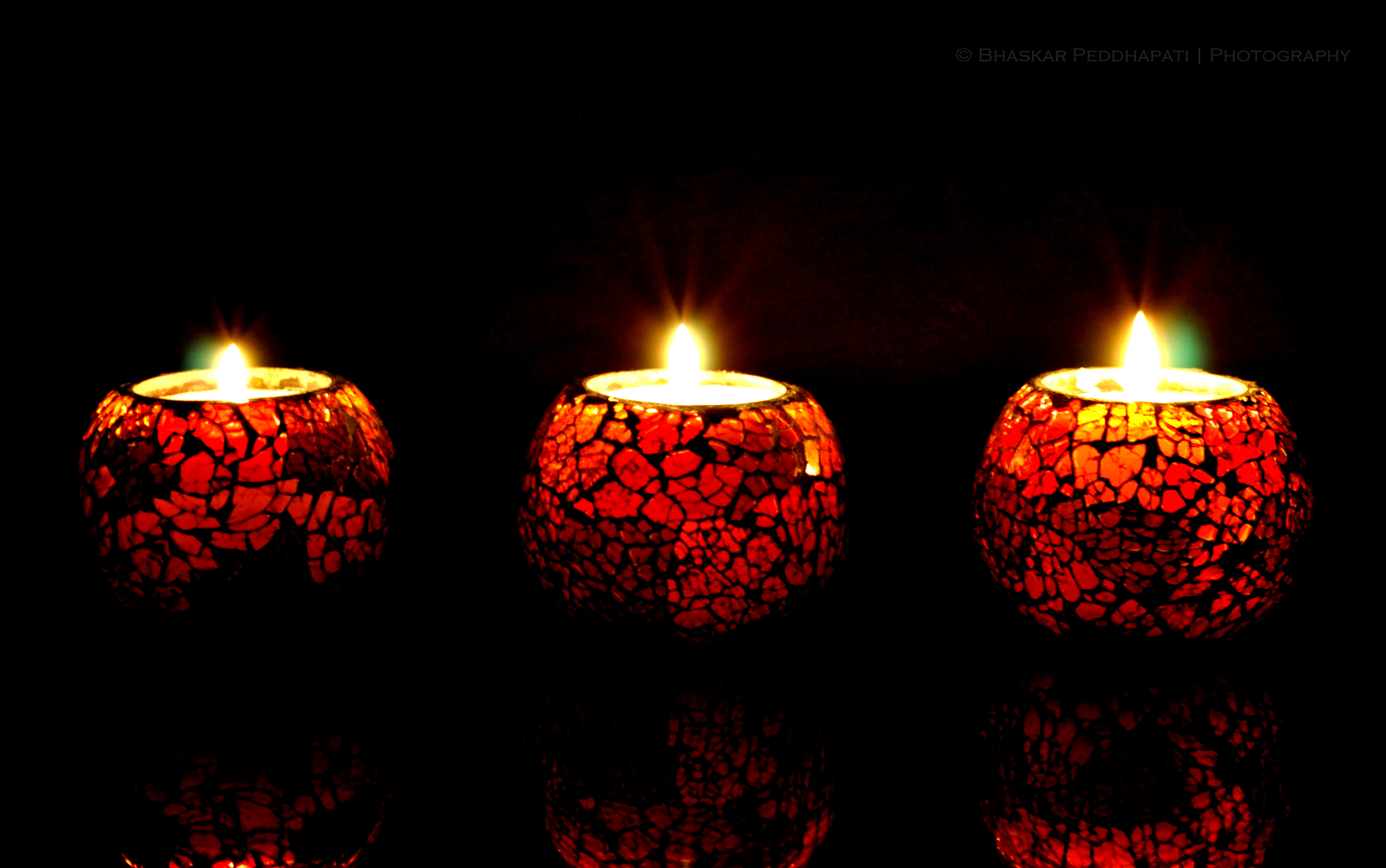
In 2014 more than 400,000 people attended events organised by Radio Tarana, including its annual Diwali festival.

Tarana began broadcasting on 15 June 1996 at 5.00pm, to showcase popular Hindi songs from the 1950s to now, including Bollywood music, popular tracks and new remixes. This includes live music and local music tracks. Other programmes include local news and sports bulletins, interviews, and discussions on local contributors covering issues affecting local migrant communities.

Tarana has supported community events and activities, and provided on-air event listings, birthday announcements, and death notices. It has sponsored the Indian Republic Day Show, Festival of India, Diwali Mela, India Independence Day Show, and similar events. The events it organised around the country in 2014 attracted more than 400,000 people. With a broad range of programming blocks, the station has tried to reach a range of age groups, social backgrounds and other segments of the audience.

=== Language use ===
Radio Tarana broadcasts in a combination of Hindi and New Zealand English. It was set up specifically to promote the Hindi language and serve Hindi-speaking communities. Many of its hosts are proficient in the Hindi language, experts in language usage, or advocates for its continued use in New Zealand. Some of the hosts have worked for overseas media outlets like Fiji Broadcasting Corporation, Radio Fiji, Radio Navtarang, Radio Sargam, Mirchi FM and the BBC. Many are prominent community figures or have been master of ceremonies at local community events.

Journalist and media commentator Thakur Ranjit Singh, the former publisher of Fiji Daily Post, has been critical of Radio Tarana's extensive use of Hindi. In 2012, he wrote Tarana had used and promoted a high quality of traditional Hindi, maintaining language decorum, sensitivity and proper usage. He suggested rival network Apna had used pidgin, slang and Fiji Hindi, and had compromised the language with "linguistic engineering". However, Singh claimed Tarana was not translating words into New Zealand English or explaining words in ways young and second generation listeners could understand. He argued this excluded listeners who had limited exposure to the Hindi language, including school children whose friends and peers were mostly Pākehā. He suggest this could undermine Tarana's efforts to promote the Hindi language.

=== Religious complaints ===
Radio Tarana has been the subject of Broadcasting Standards Authority complaints relating to its coverage of religious issues. The first related to a series about religious procedures following the death of a Muslim person. A Muslim priest argued the dates and times of making supplications did not need to be fixed, and a Muslim commentator they did. The host argued the priest was right, and was accused of being unfair and derogatory to the Muslim commentator. Radio Tarana disputed the claim, accusing the commentator of being derogatory towards the priest, and said the programme was no longer on air. The broadcaster was unable to provide tapes of the programme, and the authority found it could not determine the case. It asked Tarana to keep recordings of future programmes.

Another complaint related to Zinadgi Forever, a Christian radio programme produced by Navjaveen Ministries International and broadcast on Radio Tarana. The programme's host had discussed his conversion from Hinduism to Christianity on air, saying after he received a Bible he "never walked in darkness again" and "never walked in untruth again". He was accused of discriminating against and denigrating the Hindu religion and breaching responsible programme standards in 2009. However, the authority ruled the host was entitled to discuss his personal views and experiences with Christianity, and the programme did not encourage denigration or discrimination against Hindu people.

== News ==
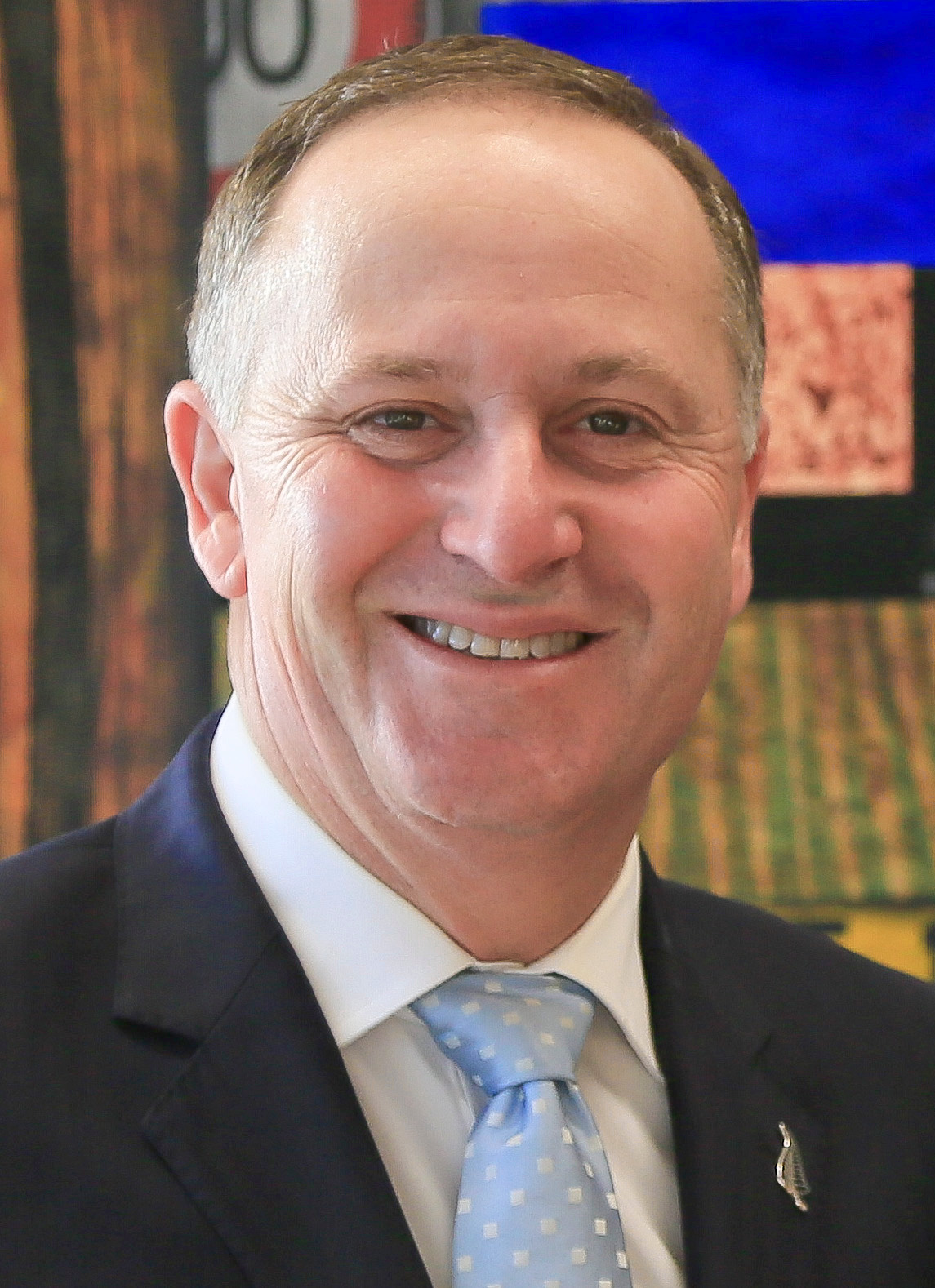
Radio Tarana regularly interviews New Zealand prime minister John Key.

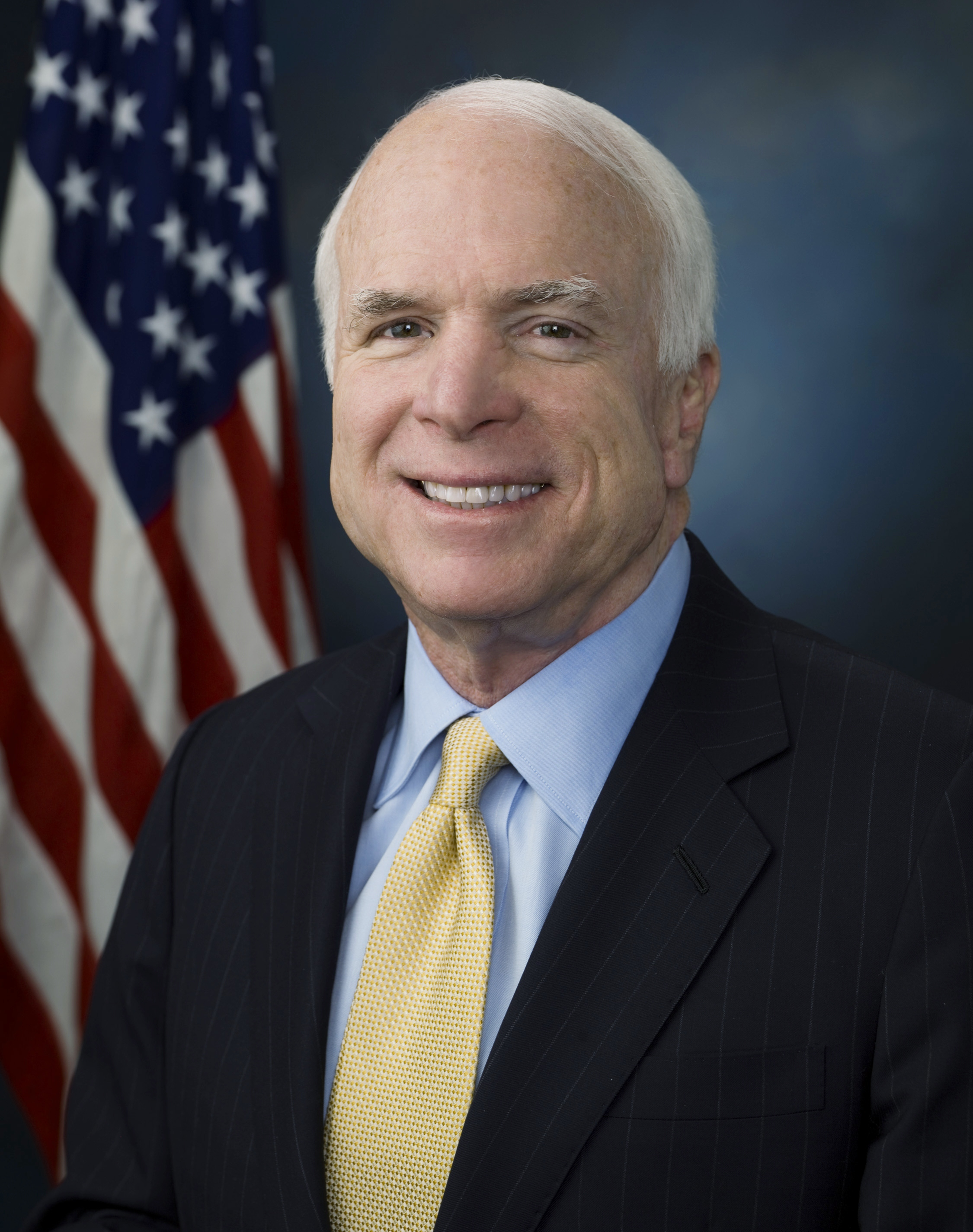
A Tarana journalist has interviewed US Senator John McCain.

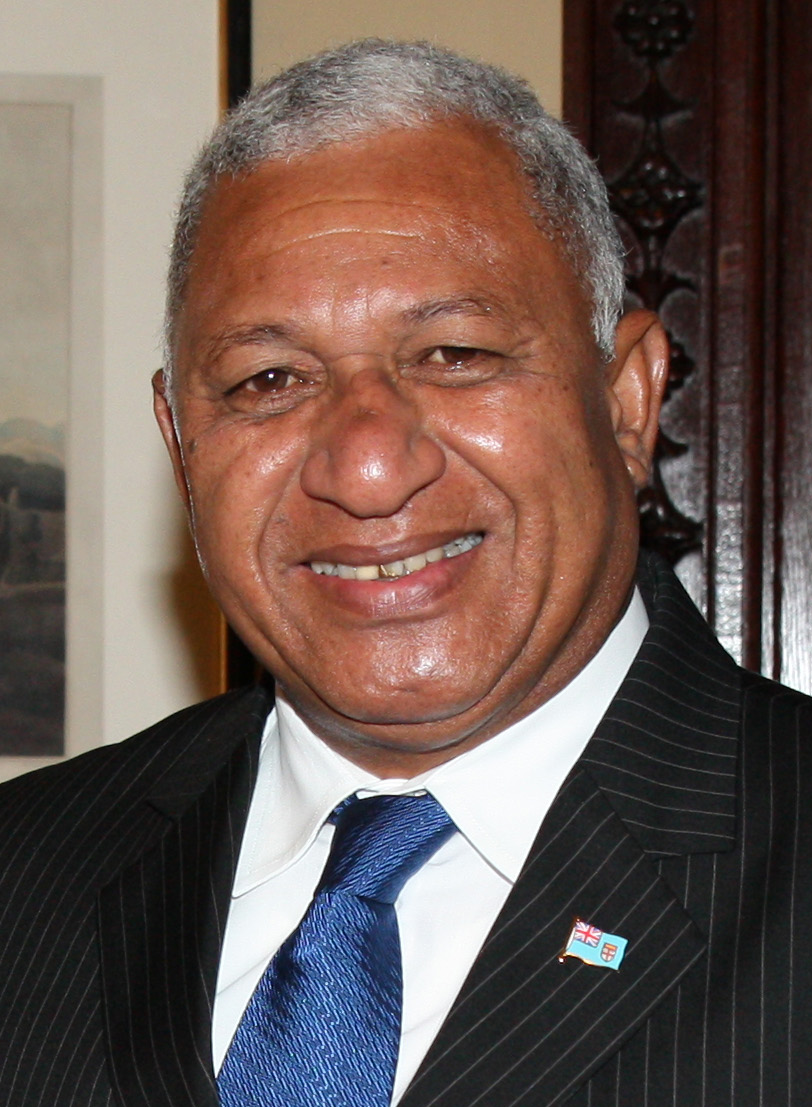
Tarana also broadcasts a weekly interview with Fijian prime minister Frank Bainimarama.

Radio Tarana has covered national and international news events, including New Zealand elections, 2000 Fijian coup d'état, 2001 Indian Parliament attack 2001 Gujarat earthquake, 2004 Indian Ocean earthquake and tsunami, 2006 Fijian coup d'état and 2014 Fijian general election. Its journalists and hosts have interviewed politicians and journalists, like US Senator John McCain, New Zealand prime minister John Key, and United Nations Development Programme administrator Helen Clark. Winston Peters and Phil Goff have also done interviews with Tarana.

The station provides coverage of cricket, soccer and rugby. Its website also includes live feeds from stuff.co.nz, Times of India, Fiji Times, Cricket Next, Bollywood Hungama and BBC News. Tarana broadcasts BBC News Hindi, BBC News Urdu and Fiji News every weekday afternoon, and broadcasts BBC News Hindi every evening of the week.

=== Fiji coverage ===
Radio Tarana covers Fijian news, political issues and events including the 2000 and 2006 coups and the 2014 general election. It is the only media outlet in the world to secure a weekly interview with Fijian prime minister Josaia Voreqe Bainimarama. Journalist Sanjesh Narayan has conducted the phone interview since Bainimarama took power. In 2011, he said it was often hard to secure the prime minister at a specific allotted time, but Bainimarama always took part. At the end of a two-hour interview at his Suva office, Bainimarama said Tarana served as a "good bridge between Fiji and New Zealand" and Narayan was a "pleasant man" he had never met.

=== Complaints ===
In 2014, the Broadcasting Standards Authority refused to uphold complaint against Radio Tarana from Fiji government minister Rajesh Singh. Tarana had broadcast a news item about District Court proceedings involving Singh, over a dispute about rent allegedly owned to the landlord of a building he leased. Singh argued the story was an unfair, inaccurate and unbalanced account of a controversial issue. He also believed the story was discriminatory, was denigration, and went against good taste and decency. However, the authority found the story was a straightforward, brief news report, and gave proper airtime to the complainant's position.

Later the same year, the authority received a complaint about Tarana's stories on the Sanil Kumar Medical Fund, which had been set up the support the treatment of a young Fijian-Indian man in New Zealand who had died after being deported back to Fiji. Radio Tarana News reported some people, including the immediate family of Kumar, had made allegations the fund was being misused by its directors. The complainants, Pradeep Chand, Asheelta Kumar, Ashok Kumar and Kamta Prasad, argued the reporting was unbalanced, inaccurate, unfair, denigrating, and likely to cause panic among the public. The authority rejected the claims, ruling the broadcaster made been reasonably balanced, fair and accurate, and the story was no discriminatory or irresponsible.

== Programmes ==
=== Weekdays ===
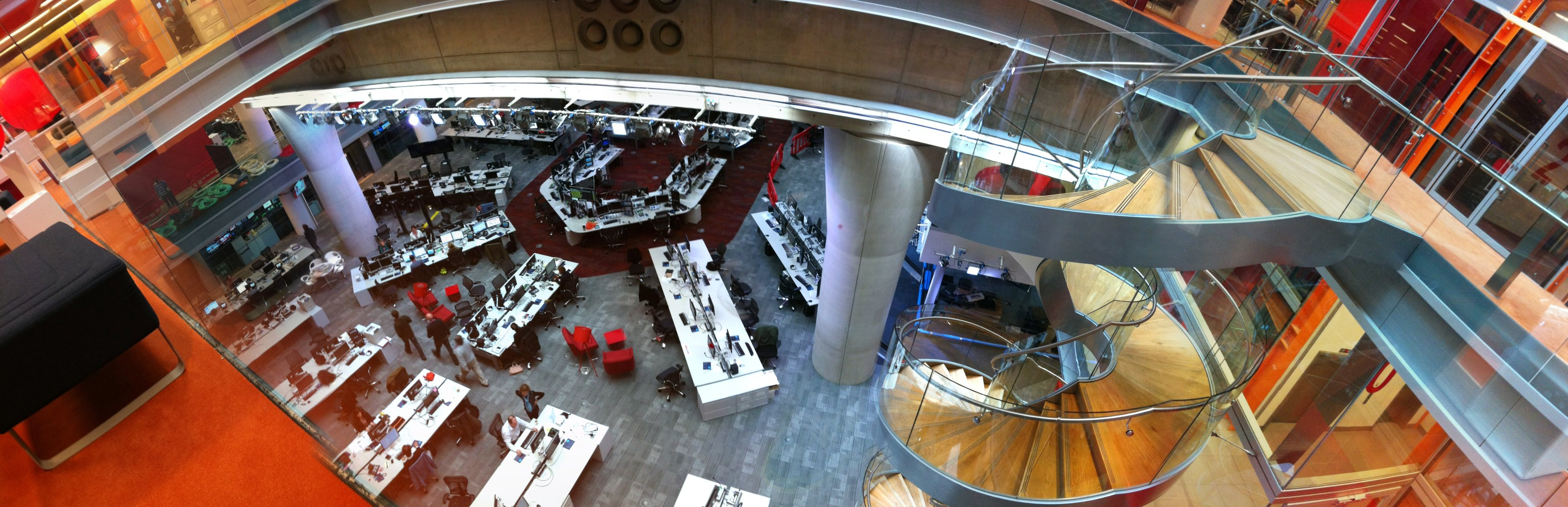
Radio Tarana broadcasts BBC News Hindi every weekday at 1.00pm and everyday at 7.00pm, direct from New Broadcasting House in London.

Radio Tarana begins each weekday morning with overnight song requests and competitions with Haseen Lamhe from 12.00am. Religious music show Devotional Music airs from 5.00am, with a Muslim version of the show on Friday mornings. The station's breakfast show, Morning No 1 with Neha and Sanjesh, airs from 6.30am and features music, news, weather, community notices, traffic reports and competitions. The morning show, Khushboo Pyar Ki with Pawan Rekha, airs from 10.00am and includes music, news and competitions. BBC News Hindi, BBC News Urdu and Fiji News are broadcast at 12.00pm. Jilesh Desai hosts afternoon show Tezz Gaadi from 1.00pm, featuring music, news and competitions. Satend Sharma hosts drive show Tarana Drive from 4.00pm, featuring news, music, birthdays, weather, community messages and BBC News Hindi.

The Broadcasting Standards Authority received a complaint about the Tarana Drive in 2012, over a Hindi language talkback segment Drive Time Chit Chat dedicated to "promiscuity". The host asked listeners to give their opinions on whether men or women were more flirty. He accessed the Facebook account of a woman who had left her account open on his phone, and read out her private conversations with a Fijian man. The woman said her Facebook profile had been accessed without permission, and the reading of her Facebook messages on air was a breach of her privacy. She also raised concerns about another episode of the programme two days later. The authority ruled she was not "identifiable beyond family and close friends" who would already know about the issue. However, the authority criticised the host for broadcasting content from social media without considering how he had found it, what he read out, and the way he was broadcasting it.

=== Weeknights ===
On Monday nights Meri Pasand hosts the Hemant Parikh music and live dedications show from 7.30pm, and Gaano Ka Khazana hosts the Hemant Parikh featured artists and dedications show from 8.00pm. On Tuesday nights, Azim hosts from 7pm, a show about soulful music, observations, love and relationship talkback, competitions and giveaways. On Wednesday nights, Manish host the Wednesday Night Fever show from 7.30 pm, with music and live dedications. On Thursday nights, Jilesh Desai presents Unplugged Guruvaar from 7.00pm, featuring mesmerizing Bollywood unplugged music, interviews, music, and live dedications, On Friday night, Nishita leads into the weekend with Tarana Bar - a show combining sports, comedy and giveaways from 7pm till midnight.

=== Weekends ===
Saturday morning shows include song requests and competitions with Haseen Lamhe from 12.00am, Punjabi Devotional Music with Kulwant Singh from 5.00am, and Zindagi Forever Christian Devotional with Navjaveen Ministries International from 7.00am. Shalend hosts Tarana Bazaar, a news, music and birthdays magazine show, from 7.30am. Neha presents Metro Talk, a music and competitions show, from 12.00pm. Nirmal Jeet Singh hosts Rangla Punjab, a Punjabi news and music show, from 4.00pm. Dr. Parmjeet Parmar presents Mehfil, a music and competition show that incorporates BBC News Hindi, airs from 6.00pm. Shalend, Mona and Satend host Saturday Night Hungama, a show of music, competitions and cross-overs to Fiji, from 8.00pm until 5.00am the next morning.

On Sunday mornings, religious programme Devotional Music airs from 5.00am and Nityanand Sundar hosts religious talk and music show Prabhu Milan from 6.30am. Sagar hosts SSS from 9.00am, and Shirley hosts Show time with Shirley from 1.00pm, with both shows featuring music, news and competitions. Sanjesh, Shalend and Mehak host Radio Tarana's Sunday night show. It includes news and interviews from 4.00pm, children's competitions and music from 5.00pm, expert life advice from 6.00pm, and birthdays and BBC News Hindi from 7.00pm. Ameen Sayani hosts Sangeet Ke Sitaron Ki Mehfil from 8.00pm, showcasing a weekly featured artist, Gopal Bhatia hosts ghazal show Ghazlon Ka Guldasta from 21.00, and Gopal Bhatia hosts music and request show Raat Ke Humsafar from 10.00pm.

=== Specialist programmes ===
Radio Tarana's range of international programmes include shows like Karishma Kapoor and Akshay Kumar, Udit Narayan, Jagjit Singh, Ghulam Ali night, Salman Khan Nite, Anuradha Paudwal and Vinod Rathod Show, Usha Uthup Show, Anup Jalota Nite, Gurudass Mann Nite, Hans Raj Hans Show, and Jaspinder Narula Nite.

Tarana also has its own programmes for Ramadan, hosted by Pawan Rekha Prasad, include the Saheri Programme from 3.00am to 6.00am, Daily Azaans five times each day, Niyat for commencing and breaking the fast, Quran Tafseer, and local, Fijian and other overseas Bayans. It also broadcasts a children's segment, quizzes, competitions and prizes.

== Other services ==
=== Events and promotions ===
Between 2010 and 2012, Radio Tarana held an annual karaoke contest for the title Radio Tarana Idol. The event was promoted as a way for musicians to showcase their talents to Indian, Indo-Fijian, Pakistani, Bangladeshi and Nepalese communities. Auditions were held in the Tarana studios during the drive programme and were open to New Zealand residents of any age. The final was held during the Friday drive programme. Tarana has also sponsored community business events, like the Indian Newslink Indian Business Awards in 2012.

=== iHeartRadio stream ===
In October 2014, New Zealand Media and Entertainment announced Radio Tarana would be included on its iHeartRadio digital platform. In a statement, the company said the Indian community was one of the fastest growing ethnic communities in New Zealand, with a population over 180,000. It also claimed Radio Tarana was "the most trusted source of information" to the community, with an engaged and loyal audience.

The live stream will make Tarana's Bollywood entertainment, news, sports, music and talkback available nationwide. Tarana managing director Robert Khan said it would add to Radio Tarana's leadership in social media, which reaches 261,000 people and engages 10,000 people each week.

=== MediaWorks partnership ===
In January 2015 Radio Tarana and MediaWorks New Zealand announced a partnership to collaborate commercially, extending the reach and client opportunities for both broadcasters. Khan said the arrangement protected the station's unique identity as an independent Indian community. The station would continue to have editorial control over its news, music, information, sports, culture, events and lifestyle programmes.

The partnership provided the opportunity to be part of the MediaWorks stable which included TV3, TV4, George FM, Mai FM, Magic, More FM, Radio Live, The Breeze, The Edge, The Rock and The Sound. MediaWorks commercial director Paul Hancox said the partnership would allow the company to take its brands and personalities into Tarana's markets, which would have otherwise been hard to reach. Writer Damien Venuto said the partnership made sense given the increase in new migrants to New Zealand since 1996, and the growing divide between broadcasters that are dedicated to ethnic minorities and those that are targeting a broad audience.

Khan claimed the station's listenership was growing rapidly, with Hindi becoming the fourth most spoken language in the country and Indian becoming the fifth largest ethnic group. He said the radio market was rapidly changing, audiences were becoming more fragmented, and major radio companies were starting to recognise the value of commercially successful niche broadcasters with a loyal client base. He said major broadcasters were struggling to maintain listeners for long periods of time on tradition platforms, while niche broadcasters were struggling to find free-to-air spectrum.
