= Asian New Zealanders =

New Zealanders of Asian origin

Total population
- 861,576 people (2023); 17.3% of New Zealand's population

Regions with significant populations
- Auckland, Wellington, Canterbury, Waikato

Languages
- New Zealand English · Asian languages

Religion
- 34.0% No religion 26.8% Christianity; 16.8% Hinduism; 6.2% Buddhism; 5.7% Sikhism; 5.7% Islam

Related ethnic groups
- Asian Americans · Asian Australians · Asian Britons · Asian Canadians · Asian people

Asian New Zealanders are New Zealanders of Asian ancestry (including naturalised New Zealanders who are immigrants from specific regions in Asia and descendants of such immigrants). At the 2023 census, 861,573 New Zealanders identified as being of Asian ethnicity, making up 17.3% of New Zealand's population.

The first Asians in New Zealand were Chinese workers who migrated to New Zealand to work in the gold mines in the 1860s. The modern period of Asian immigration began in the 1970s when New Zealand relaxed its restrictive policies to attract migrants from Asia.

== Terminology ==
Under Statistics New Zealand classification, the term refers to a pan-ethnic group that includes diverse populations who have ancestral origins in East Asia (e.g. Chinese, Korean, Japanese), Southeast Asia (e.g. Filipino, Vietnamese, Malaysian), and South Asia (e.g. Nepalese, Indian (incl. Indo-Fijians), Sri Lankan, Bangladeshi, Pakistani). New Zealanders of West Asian and Central Asian ancestry are excluded from this term.

Colloquial usage of the term Asian in New Zealand, as differentiated from the Statistics New Zealand definition, primarily refers to those of Chinese ethnicity or other people of East Asian ancestry, and excludes people who trace their ancestry to the Indian subcontinent (i.e. South Asian ethnic groups).

== Demographics ==
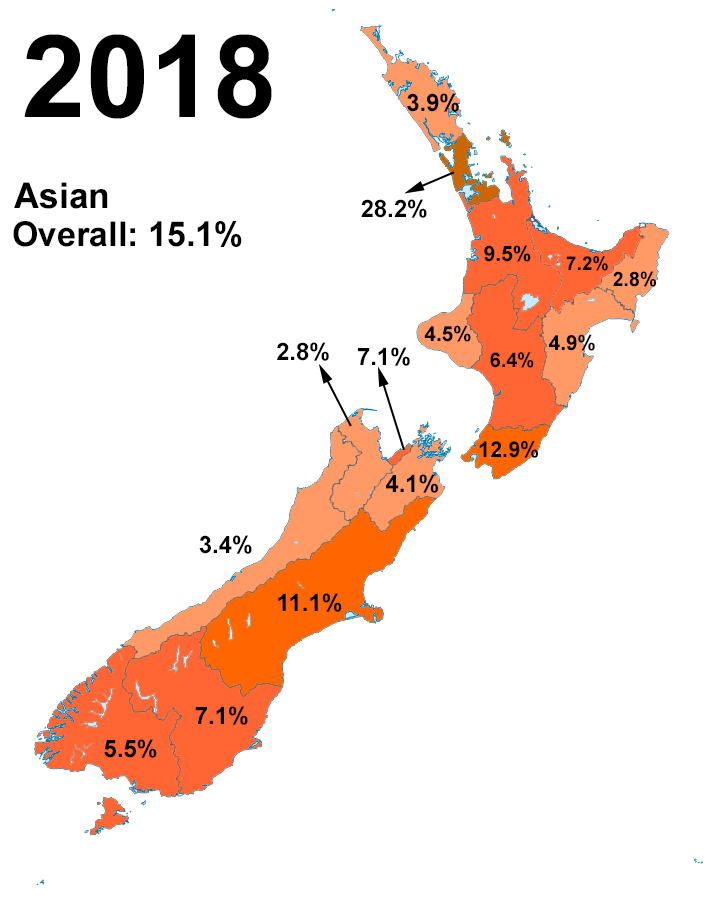
Asians in New Zealand in 2018

Asian New Zealanders population pyramid in 2018

There were 861,576 people identifying as being part of the Asian ethnic group at the 2023 New Zealand census, making up 17.3% of New Zealand's population. This is an increase of 153,978 people (21.8%) since the 2018 census, and an increase of 389,868 people (82.7%) since the 2013 census. Some of the increase between the 2013 and 2018 census was due to Statistics New Zealand starting to add ethnicity data from other sources (previous censuses, administrative data, and imputation) to the census data to reduce the number of non-responses.

The median age of Asian New Zealanders was 33.8 years, compared to 38.1 years for all New Zealanders; 178,302 people (20.7%) were aged under 15 years, 177,582 (20.6%) were 15 to 29, 438,675 (50.9%) were 30 to 64, and 67,023 (7.8%) were 65 or older.

At the 2018 census, there were 348,948 males and 358,650 females, giving a sex ratio of 0.973 males per female. 23.0% of the Asian ethnic group was born in New Zealand, up from 22.7% at the 2013 census and 20.0% at the 2006 census. Of those born in New Zealand, 64.6% were under the age of 15.

The majority of Asian New Zealanders live in the Auckland Region. As of the 2023 census, 60.1% (518,178) of Asian New Zealanders lived in the Auckland region, 25.3% (218,586) lived in the North Island outside the Auckland region, and 14.5% (124,800) lived in the South Island. Two of Auckland's local boards have a majority Asian population: Howick (52.4%) and Puketāpapa (50.4%). Hamilton City had the highest concentration of Asian New Zealanders outside Auckland at 22.8%. Great Barrier Island and the Wairoa district had the lowest concentrations of Asian New Zealanders, both at 1.7%.

Chinese, Indian, Filipino, Korean are the most commonly nominated Asian ancestries in New Zealand. Chinese New Zealanders were 4 percent of the New Zealand population (2013) and Indian New Zealanders were 3 percent of the New Zealand population (2013).

Asian Ethnic groups in New Zealand, 2001–18 census
Ethnicity	2001 census		2006 census		2013 census		2018 census	
Ethnicity	Number	%	Number	%	Number	%	Number	%
Chinese New Zealanders	100,680	2.81	139,731	3.62	163,101	4.07	247,770	5.3
Indian New Zealanders	60,213	1.68	97,443	2.52	143,520	3.58	239,193	5.1
Filipino New Zealanders	11,091	0.31	16,938	0.44	40,350	1.01	72,612	1.5
Korean New Zealanders	19,026	0.53	30,792	0.80	30,171	0.75	35,664	0.76
Japanese New Zealanders	10,026	0.28	11,910	0.31	14,118	0.35	18,141	0.39
Sri Lankan New Zealanders	6,042	0.17	7,041	0.18	9,561	0.24	16,830	0.36
Fijian Indian New Zealanders	1,983	0.06	5,616	0.15	10,929	0.27	15,000	0.32
Thai New Zealanders	4,554	0.13	6,057	0.16	8,052	0.20	10,251	0.22
Vietnamese New Zealanders	3,462	0.10	4,770	0.12	6,660	0.17	10,086	0.21
Cambodian New Zealanders	5,268	0.15	6,915	0.18	8,601	0.21	9,672	0.20
Taiwanese New Zealanders	3,768	0.11	5,448	0.14	5,715	0.14	6,570	0.14
Indonesian New Zealanders	2,073	0.06	3,261	0.08	4,137	0.10	6,033	0.13
Malaysian New Zealanders	2,052	0.06	3,537	0.09	4,797	0.12	3,729	0.08
Asian (not further defined)	3,927	0.11	2,160	0.06	4,623	0.12	11,811	0.25
Total Asian New Zealanders	238,179	6.64	354,552	9.18	471,708	11.76	707,598	15.1

== Discrimination ==
=== Immigration ===
The political party New Zealand First has frequently criticised immigration on economic, social and cultural grounds. New Zealand First leader Winston Peters has on several occasions characterised the rate of Asian immigration into New Zealand as too high; in 2004, he stated: "We are being dragged into the status of an Asian colony and it is time that New Zealanders were placed first in their own country." On 26 April 2005, he said: "Māori will be disturbed to know that in 17 years' time they will be outnumbered by Asians in New Zealand", an estimate disputed by Statistics New Zealand, the government's statistics bureau. Peters quickly responded that Statistics New Zealand had underestimated the growth-rate of the Asian community in the past. Peters' statement was proven narrowly incorrect in time; at the 2023 census, 18 years later, Asians made up 17.3% of the population while Māori made up 17.8% of the population.

In April 2008, deputy New Zealand First party leader Peter Brown drew widespread attention after voicing similar views and expressing concern at the increase in New Zealand's ethnic Asian population: "We are going to flood this country with Asian people with no idea what we are going to do with them when they come here." "The matter is serious. If we continue this open door policy there is real danger we will be inundated with people who have no intention of integrating into our society. The greater the number, the greater the risk. They will form their own mini-societies to the detriment of integration and that will lead to division, friction and resentment."

=== Anti-Asian racism due to the COVID-19 pandemic ===
Asians, specifically Chinese New Zealanders and others of East Asian origin, reported several instances of discrimination during and after the COVID-19 pandemic. In a study of 1,452 participants who identified as from Asian descent published in the New Zealand Medical Journal, 40.3% reported experiences with racism. The most common forms of racism were microaggressions and verbal attacks occurring predominantly in public places, social media, mainstream media and schools. Nearly 50% of high school and tertiary students "reported experiencing racism during the pandemic." In Rolleston, Canterbury, an email was sent to a Chinese-origin student's parent, which reportedly said, "our Kiwi kids don't want to be in the same class with your disgusting virus spreaders." Canterbury has a very small population of Asians. One significant finding from the same study, "Asian New Zealanders' experiences of racism during the COVID-19 pandemic and its association with life satisfaction," is that participants living in rural areas are significantly more likely to experience racism than participants living in urban areas. However, there are numerous reports of "racial outbursts" and "microaggressions" reported by several New Zealand news outlets.

In response to the rise in racism against Asians, the New Zealand government has commissioned reports to combat racism. According to The New Zealand Herald, "Labour MP Raymond Huo said the coronavirus had become the number one issue among the local Chinese community both for efforts to ensure safety of family members and for the incidents of racial abuse it was bringing." In response to the 2021 Atlanta spa shootings, hundreds of people marched in Auckland protesting against Asian hate and racism on 27 March 2021. During the rally, Labour MP Naisi Chen said "Racism has been part of the country for a very long time," calling on the Asian community to step forward and serve in government.

== See also ==
- List of ethnic origins of New Zealanders

=== Asians in other countries ===
- Asian Americans
- Asian Argentines
- Asian Australians
- Asian Canadians
- Asian Brazilians
- Asian Peruvians
- Asian South Africans
- Asian French
- British Asian
- East Asians in the United Kingdom
