= Sindhi Australians =

Ethnic group in Australia from Sindh

Sindhi Australians سنڌي آسٽريلين
Total population
- 2,635

Regions with significant populations
- Sydney · Melbourne

Languages
- Sindhi · English

Religion
- Hinduism (Majority) · Islam (Minority)

Related ethnic groups
- Indian Australians · Pakistani Australians

Sindhi Australians (Sindhi: آسٽريلي سنڌي (Perso-Arabic); सिंधी आस्ट्रेलियाई (Devanagari);) are Australians that have Sindhi origins. According to the SBS Australia Census Explorer, there are an estimated 2,635 Sindhis in Australia, a 65% increase since 2016, mostly in areas like Sydney and Melbourne.

== History ==
Early migrations existed before the 20th century from British India, however they were very few. In 1952, Government of Pakistan gifted Australia 10 Red Sindhi bulls.
