= Punjabi Australians =

Ethnic group in Australia

Panjābī Āsṭrēlvī

Total population
- 239,033 (2021)

Regions with significant populations
- Victoria: 56,171 (2016)
- New South Wales: 33,435 (2016)
- Queensland: 17,991 (2016)
- Western Australia: 12,223 (2016)
- South Australia: 9,306 (2016)
- Australian Capital Territory: 2,215 (2016)
- Northern Territory: 670 (2016)
- Tasmania: 489 (2016)

Languages
- Punjabi · Hindi · Urdu · English

Religion
- Sikhism · Hinduism · Islam

Related ethnic groups
- Indian Australians · Pakistani Australians

Punjabi Australians are Australians who are of Punjabi descent. According to the 2016 census, Punjabi is one of the fastest-growing languages in Australia, with 132,499 individuals identifying as Punjabi-speakers. This is an increase from 71,230 individuals in 2011 and 26,000 individuals in 2006, representing a five-fold growth in 10 years.

== Demographics ==
Percentage of people in each Australian Bureau of Statistics (ABS) statistical area 1 (SA1) of the town of Woolgoolga and nearby Sandy Beach and Safety Beach who reported speaking Punjabi at home in the 2021 census. 0–5% 5–10% 10–15% 15–20% 20–25% 25–30% 30–35% 35–40%

When ordered state-wise, the largest population of Punjabis is in Victoria (56,171 individuals), followed by New South Wales (33,435), Queensland (17,991), Western Australia (12,223), South Australia (9,306), the Australian Capital Territory (2,215), the Northern Territory (670) and Tasmania (489). Over 40 percent of Punjabi Australians are between the age bracket of 25 to 34 years. 55.6% of Punjabis are males and 44.4% are females, compared to the national average of 49.3% and 50.7% respectively. Most Punjabi-speakers earned a weekly income of $800 to $999. 8.9% of Punjabi men stated they did not earn an income, compared to 30.3% of women.

According to the 2016 census, out of the people who identified as Punjabi-speakers, the vast majority declared themselves as Sikhs (108,276 people, comprising 82.9%), followed by Hindus (16,546 people, comprising 12.7%) and Muslims (1,495 people, comprising 1.1%), while 2,214 individuals declared no religion (1.7%).

78.1% (102,661 people) of Punjabi-speakers listed India as their country of birth, followed by 17.3% (22,808 people) in Australia; 0.9% (1,192 people) in Pakistan (separately, Pakistani Australians had a population of 61,913 in the 2016 census); and another 0.9% (1,163 people) in Malaysia. Punjabi was the most commonly spoken mother tongue amongst Indian Australians, with 22 percent of all Indian-born Australians stating they spoke Punjabi at home; it was followed by Hindi, Malayalam and Gujarati. Punjabi is also amongst the top ten most spoken languages of Australia, and the seventh most common language in Melbourne, where it is spoken by 1.2% of the city's population. Over 90 percent of Punjabi-speakers reported that they spoke English "very well" or "well".

The suburb of Craigieburn in Victoria had one of the largest proportion of Punjabis, where 3,937 people or 9.8% of people identified as Punjabi, followed by Blacktown in New South Wales, where 3,243 people or 8.1% of people were Punjabis. The farming town of Woolgoolga in upper New South Wales is home to one of the earliest and largest Punjabi Sikh populations in regional Australia, dating back to the start of the 20th century. It was also the site of Australia's first gurdwara.

== See also ==
- Sikhism in Australia
- Australian Sikh Heritage Trail
- Man Mohan Singh
- "Afghan" cameleers in Australia
- Indian Australians
- Pakistani Australians
