= Australia–Pakistan relations =

- Pakistan: Australia

Monthly value of Australian merchandise exports to Pakistan (A$ millions) since 1988

Monthly value of Pakistani merchandise exports to Australia (A$ millions) since 1988

Bilateral relations exist between Australia and Pakistan. Former Pakistani President Pervez Musharraf having visited Australia in 2005, former Australian Prime Minister John Howard also visited Pakistan in 2005. In 2011, there were 30,000 Pakistani Australians.

== Overview ==
The relations between the two countries have been friendly, with former Pakistani President Pervez Musharraf having visited Australia in 2005 and the then Prime Minister of Australia, John Howard, having visited Pakistan in 2005 as well, following the 2005 Kashmir earthquake which had targeted the northern areas of Pakistan. He also announced 500 new scholarships for Pakistani students to study in Australia.

Over 500 scholarships have been given to Pakistani students for postgraduate studies in Australia.

== Pakistani Australians ==
According to the Department of Immigration and Citizenship of the Government of Australia, the 2011 Australian census states that there were 30,221 Pakistan-born people in Australia, an increase of 77.8 per cent from the 2006 Census. The 2011 distribution by state and territory showed New South Wales had the largest number, with 13,382, followed by Victoria (9187), Western Australia (2521) and Queensland (2357). According to the Pakistan Embassy in Canberra, the number of Pakistanis in Australia is closer to 70,000 as the Department of Immigration and Citizenship does not include the children of Pakistanis who are born in Australia.

== Trade ==
Pakistan's exports to Australia reached their peak in 2011 by reaching US$167 million while imports in the same period reached US$437 million. Both countries vowed to take the bilateral trade to US$1 billion with some concerted efforts at public and private levels.

== Military relations ==
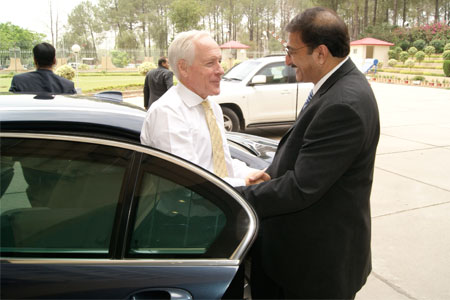
George Timothy, Australian High Commissioner to Pakistan

Both Australia and Pakistan were a part of the South East Asian version of NATO called SEATO, also known as a 'mutual defence pact'. The two countries have held bilateral defence and security talks since 2006. The 1.5 Track Security Dialogue was initiated in 2010. The talks involve the two governments, while the 1.5 Track Dialogue involves a number of key decision makers and think tanks from both sides. Defence cooperation has increased considerably as a result of the two mechanisms. The focus of cooperation has been on training programmes. Some have argued that Australia should modestly diminish its defence cooperation with Pakistan in order to focus on higher strategic priorities.

== Sporting relations ==
The two countries are particularly known for their long sporting history in cricket, and the contests between their national sides.

== Diplomatic missions ==
The High Commission of Australia in Islamabad is the diplomatic mission of Australia to Pakistan. The High Commission was established in Karachi in 1948, with Australia's first High Commissioner to Pakistan appointed in 1949. When the Pakistani government moved its capital from Karachi to Islamabad in 1966, the Australian High Commission also moved.

== See also ==
- Foreign relations of Australia
- Foreign relations of Pakistan
- Pakistani Australian
- Australians in Pakistan
- Karachi To Melbourne Tram
