= Australia–Bangladesh relations =

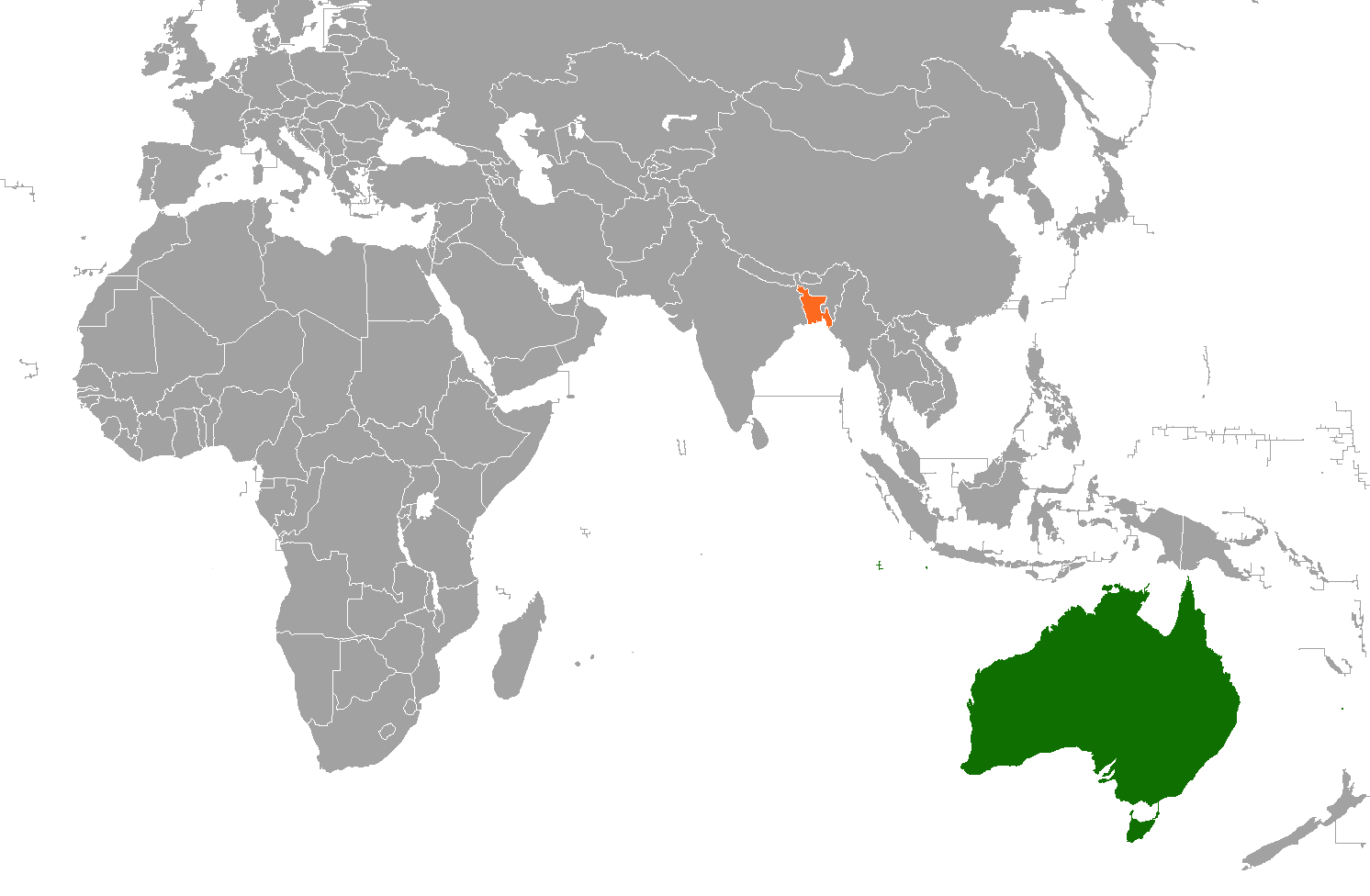

- Australia: Bangladesh

Monthly value of Australian merchandise exports to Bangladesh (A$ millions) since 1988

Monthly value of Bangladeshi merchandise exports to Australia (A$ millions) since 1988

Bilateral relations exist between Australia and Bangladesh.

== History ==
Australia was the fourth country, and the first in the developed world, to recognise Bangladesh's independence in 1971. A high commission was opened in Dhaka and relations have been warm since then.

== Trade and investment ==
Australian Oil and Gas company Santos is a major investor in Bangladesh's natural resources sector. In 2014 trade between the two countries crossed AUD 1 billion mark, of which 450 million came from Bangladesh's exports to Australia. Australia enjoying a surplus of AUD 160 million dollar on trade.

== Diplomacy ==
High Commissioner of Bangladesh in Australia is Kazi Imtiaz Hossain as of 2015. Previous high commissioner was Lieutenant General (retired) Masud Uddin Chowdhury. VFS Global collects applications for Australian Visa in Bangladesh. In 2016, Julia Niblett was appointed Australian High Commissioner in Bangladesh, preceded by Greg Wilcox.

== Defence and security cooperation ==
The two countries participate in joint military exercises.

== Sports ==
The two countries are cricket Test playing nations and regularly compete against each other in tournaments, series and cricket world cup.

== Human rights ==
Australia and Bangladesh are one of the few countries that provide the option of third gender on their passports. Australia Bangladesh Solidarity Network is a human rights organisation working for the garment workers in Bangladesh.

== See also ==
- Foreign relations of Australia
- Foreign relations of Bangladesh
- Bangladeshi Australians
