= Bangladeshi Australians =

Australian citizens or residents having full or partial heritage of Bangladesh

অস্ট্রেলীয় বাংলাদেশী
- Boishakhi Mela, celebrated by Bangladeshi Australians, at Sydney Olympic Park in 2010.

Total population
- 51,491 (by birth) (2021)

Regions with significant populations
- New South Wales: 29,600 (2021)
- Victoria: 10,295 (2021)
- Queensland: 3,304 (2021)
- South Australia: 2,246 (2021)
- Western Australia: 2,816 (2021)
- Tasmania: 595 (2021)
- Northern Territory: 701 (2021)
- Australian Capital Territory: 1,938 (2021)

Languages
- Australian English · Bangladeshi English · Bengali

Religion
- 87.1% Muslim; 7.1% Hinduism; 2.2% No religion 1.5% Catholic

Related ethnic groups
- Asian Australians · Bangladeshi diaspora · Bangladeshi New Zealanders
- Includes not answer (3.4%) and not stated (1.8%)

Bangladeshi Australians (Bengali: অস্ট্রেলীয় বাংলাদেশী) refers to Australian citizens or residents who have full or partial Bangladeshi heritage or people who emigrated from Bangladesh and reside in Australia. There are around 51,491 people born in Bangladesh living in Australia, according to the census in 2021. Additionally, there is a significant number of Bangladeshi descent Australians (born in Australia), but their numbers are uncertain. The largest Bangladeshi communities are mainly present in the states of New South Wales and Victoria, with large concentrations in the cities of Sydney and Melbourne.

== History ==
Bangladeshis are relatively new migrants to Australia. After the liberation of Bangladesh in 1971, migration has steadily increased with the majority arriving under the Skilled Migration Program. Most Bangladesh-born have settled in the urban areas of New South Wales while smaller numbers settled in other states and territories.

In the late 1990s, 2000s and early 2010s early Bangladeshi migrants settled in more affordable suburbs in Sydney and Melbourne, notably Lakemba, Rockdale, and Eastlakes, forming communities there. More recently, there has been a shift to suburbs farther from CBDs with larger average dwelling sizes, such as Macquarie Fields, Tarneit, Minto and Ingleburn.

== Demography ==
The latest census in 2021 recorded 51,491 Bangladesh-born people in Australia, an increase from the 2016 census which recorded 41,233. A total of 53.5% were male and 46.5% were female, while 67% overall were Australian citizens.

A total of 68.4% of Bangladeshi-Australians aged 15 or above had attained a bachelor's degree or higher, notably higher than the national average of 26.3%. 71.9% were in the workforce, higher than the national average of 61.1%. Bangladeshi-Australians also had a median household weekly income of $1,940, higher than the national average of $1,740.

A total of 87.2% recorded Islam as their religious affiliation, while 7.1% recorded Hinduism.

== Notable people ==
- Tanveer Ahmed, psychiatrist and television presenter
- Mohammad Shahe Zaman Titu - Former Liberal Councillor (Canterbury-Bankstown) & Community Leader
- Arka Das, actor and director
- Robin Khuda, billionaire and founder of AirTrunk
- Tanzil Rahman, Northern Territory Country Liberal Party politician

== See also ==
- Australia–Bangladesh relations
- Bangladeshi diaspora
- Indian diaspora
- Indian Australians
- Pakistani Australians
- Bangladeshi New Zealanders
