= New Zealand–Vietnam relations =

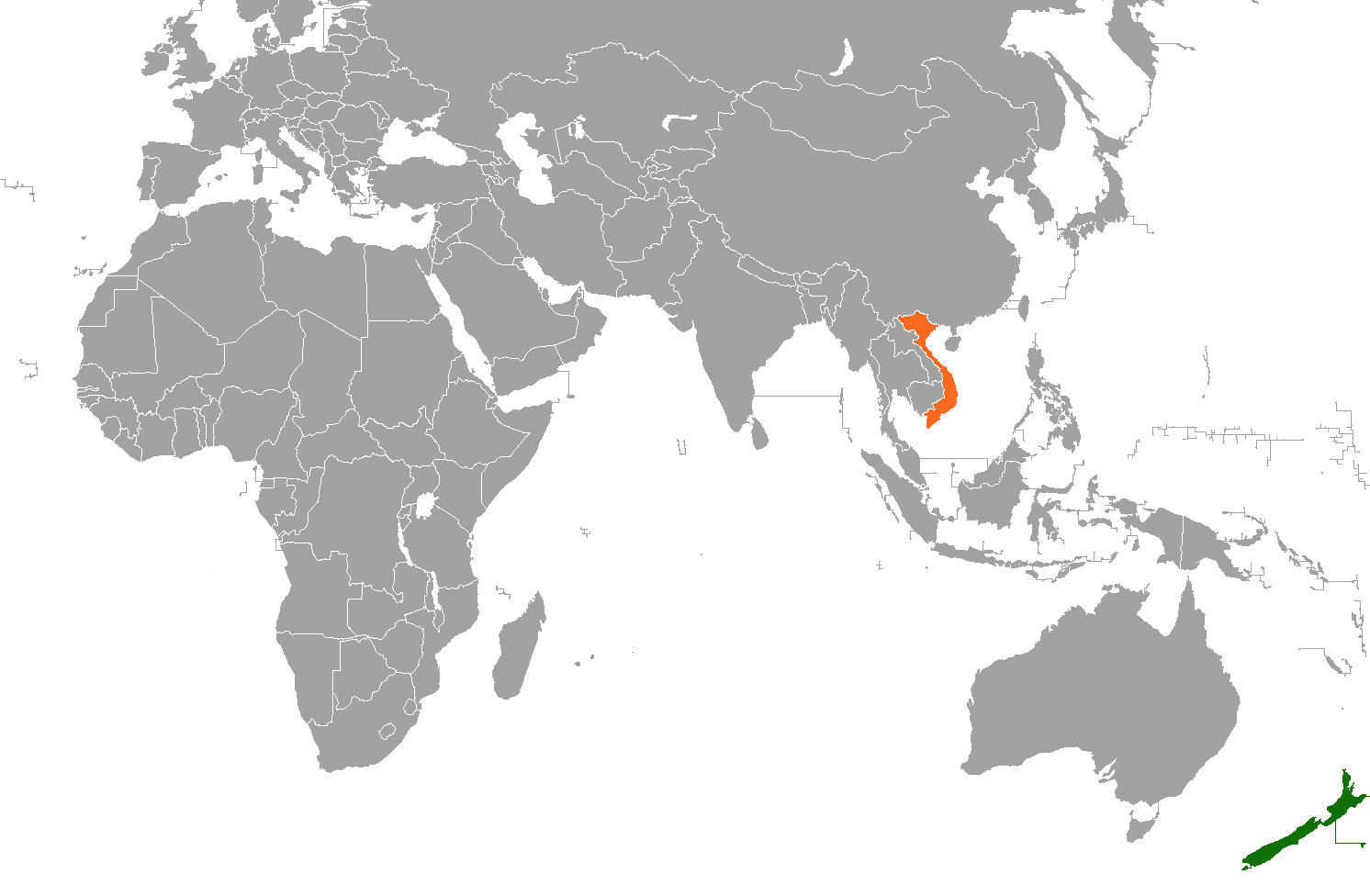

- New Zealand: Vietnam

New Zealand–Vietnam relations refers to the bilateral relations between New Zealand and Vietnam. New Zealand has an embassy in Hanoi and a consulate-general in Ho Chi Minh City. Vietnam has an embassy in Wellington.

== History ==
Diplomatic ties were established in 1975, with New Zealand being one of the first nations to establish diplomatic ties with the newly unified Vietnam. New Zealand and Vietnam established Comprehensive Partnership in 2008. Since then, there have been a growth in political exchanges, bilateral trade and education links. The two nations celebrated their 40th anniversary of diplomatic relations in 2015. Direct flights between the two nations started in 2016. In 2025, Two prime ministers, Pham Minh Chinh and Christopher Luxon held a joint press conference on the results of their talks for upgrade bilateral ties to comprehensive strategic partnership.

=== Vietnam War and aftermath ===
New Zealand participated in the Vietnam War. The country sent 3000 military and civilian personnel.

== Trade ==
As of November 2015, Vietnam was New Zealand's fastest-growing export market and its 19th largest export market; this led to agreements on aviation, healthcare and education being made between the two nations. Earlier that year, a goal was set by both countries to double trade between the two of them, as both countries were set on signing the Trans-Pacific Partnership amidst criticism.

== Migration ==
New Zealand also has a relatively small Vietnamese community of around 6,000 people, which consists of refugees and their families, economic migrants, and students.

"Boat People" from Vietnam (1979) expressed concern over the "Boat People":

== Diplomatic representatives ==
=== Vietnamese ambassadors to New Zealand ===
South Vietnam ambassadors to New Zealand

1. Trần Văn Lắm (1962–1964, resident in Canberra)
2. Nguyễn Văn Hiếu (1964–1966, resident in Canberra)
3. Trần Kim Phượng (1967–1970, resident in Canberra)
4. Nghiêm Mỹ (1969–1972, Chargé d'affaires, resident in Wellington)
5. Đoàn Bá Cang (1972–1974, the first resident Ambassador)
6. Nguyễn Hoàn (1974–1975, until the Fall of Saigon)

== See also ==
- Foreign relations of New Zealand
- Foreign relations of Vietnam
- Vietnamese New Zealanders
