= Australians in Pakistan =

Ethnic group in Pakistan

Total population
- 600 (2001)

Regions with significant populations
- Islamabad · Karachi · Lahore

Languages
- Australian English · Urdu

Religion
- Christianity · Islam

Related ethnic groups
- Australian diaspora

Australians in Pakistan comprise Australian citizens residing in Pakistan, which includes expatriates and immigrants, as well as their locally-born descendants.

== History ==
Australian officials and military personnel were present in the region during the British Raj period, before the independence of Pakistan. Since the early twentieth century, Australian Defence Force soldiers have received military training at the Command and Staff College in Quetta. The first Australian attended the college in 1907. Notable Australian soldiers who graduated from the college include Field Marshal Thomas Blamey and Major-General George Alan Vasey.

== Demographics ==
There were over 600 Australians living in Pakistan as of late 2001, based on registrations with the Australian Department of Foreign Affairs and Trade. By May 2002, this figure was at over 500.

A small Australian community is based in Karachi, while the remaining are scattered in Islamabad, Lahore and other cities.

== Community ==
Many Australian expatriates work for multinational companies. There are currently over 80 Australian companies from different sectors with operations in Pakistan, including large firms such as BHP.

A small number of Australians work for development agencies and non-governmental organisations such as World Vision. Others are social workers involved in various types of community work.

For Australian expatriates living in Islamabad, the Coolabah Club attached with the Australian High Commission is a central social venue. The club has dining, swimming and recreational facilities, and a bar serving alcohol is also available for expatriates. The community celebrates Australia Day and various other cultural festivities, which are hosted by the High Commission.

== Organisations ==
The Australian community is diplomatically represented and provided services by the Australian High Commission in Islamabad. In addition, there is an Australian consulate in Karachi. There is also an Australian Cultural Centre in Lahore that is administered by Australians. The centre provides English-language courses and promotes cultural relations between both countries.

== Notable people ==
- Dav Whatmore, coach of the Pakistan national cricket team.
- Summer Nicks, film director

== See also ==
- Australia–Pakistan relations
- Pakistani Australians
