= Pakistani Australians =

Australian citizens from Pakistani origin

پاكِستانی آسٹریلوی
- (Pakistan) (Australia)
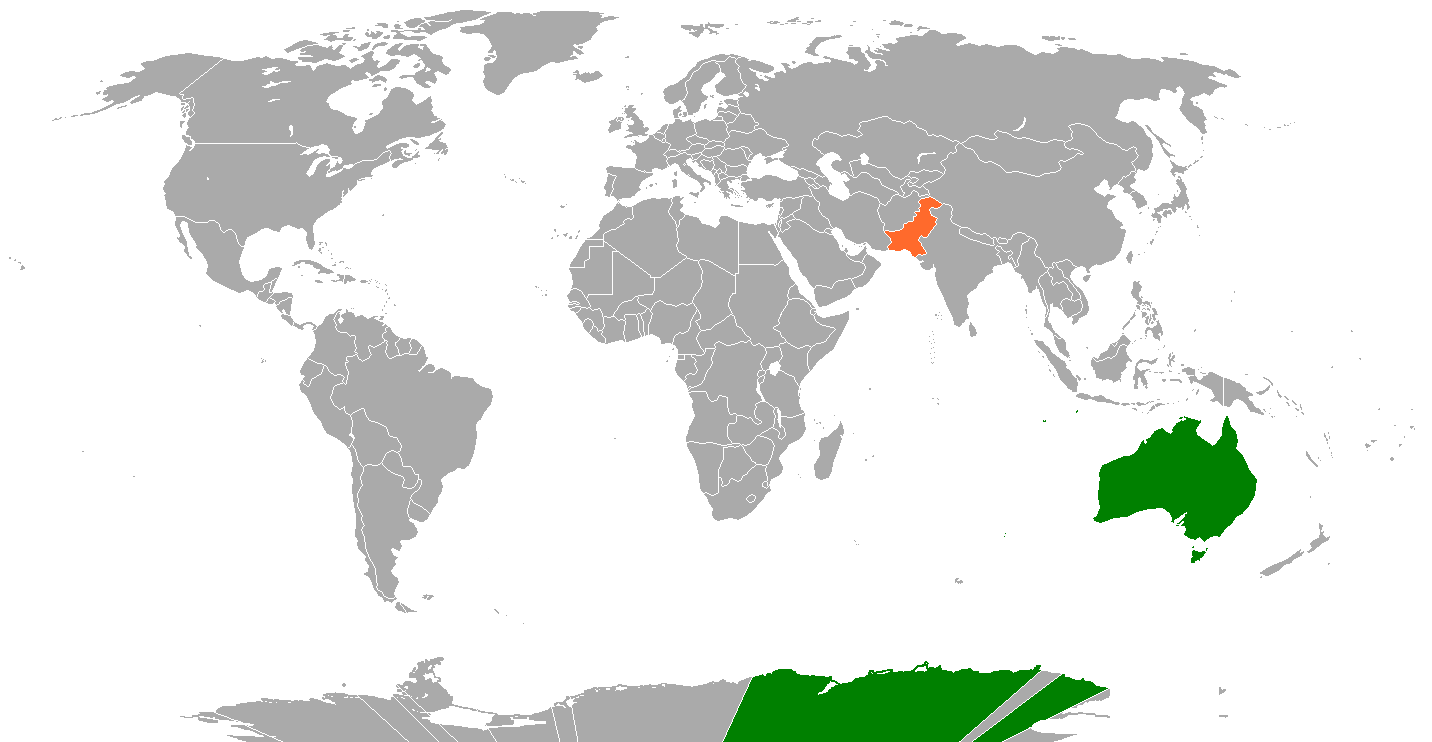

Total population
- 134,720 (born in Pakistan, 2024) (0.5% of the Australian population)

Regions with significant populations
- New South Wales: 33,902 (2022)
- Victoria: 30,945 (2022)
- Western Australia: 7,615 (2022)
- Queensland: 6,434 (2022)
- South Australia: 5,666 (2022)
- Australian Capital Territory: 2,906 (2022)
- Northern Territory: 687 (2022)
- Tasmania: 1,469 (2022)

Languages
- Australian and Pakistani English · Urdu · Punjabi · Sindhi · Pashto · Balochi · Kashmiri · others

Religion
- Predominantly Islam, with small minority of Christianity and Hinduism

Related ethnic groups
- Overseas Pakistani · Indian Australians

Pakistani Australians (Urdu: پاكِستانی آسٹریلوی) are a subgroup of the Pakistani diaspora residing in Australia. This includes both those who are Australian by birth, and those born in Pakistan or elsewhere in the diaspora. Most Pakistani Australians are Muslims by religion, although there are also sizeable Christian, Hindu and other minorities.

== History in Australia ==
Early Muslim migrants (known as "Ghans") entered Outback Australia as camel drivers in the late 1800s from Colonial India and some of those areas are now part of present-day Pakistan. Many of these men were unmarried, and intermarried with local Aboriginal women, resulting in a mixed Aboriginal Australian population with ancestry in Pakistan.

Immigration from lands that make up the historical territory of Pakistan to Australia has been occurring since the late 19 century. In the modern sense, Pakistan came into existence in 1947 as a result of the dissolution of the British Raj via the Partition of India. In the modern post-independence sense, Pakistani migrants can be dated back to the early 1950s, Immigration to Australia from Pakistan started to pick up in the 1970s. Since then the number of Pakistani immigrants increased dramatically, with thousands of Pakistanis entering Australia each year since that time.

== Demographics ==
=== Population ===
Historical population
Year	Pop.	±% p.a.
2011	33,049	—
2014	49,770	+14.62%
2016	61,913	+11.53%
2017	76,590	+23.71%
2018	84,340	+10.12%
2019	91,000	+7.90%
2021	103,121	+6.45%
2023	120,440	+8.07%

Figures from the Australian Bureau of Statistics for 2011 indicated that there were about 33,049 Pakistani Australians, of whom 30,221 were born in Pakistan. By mid-2014, the number of Pakistani-born individuals stood at 49,770. At the time of the 2016 census, the total population reached 61,913 individuals. The Pakistani community is the second fastest-growing in terms of population growth. Pakistanis are also the largest contributor of overseas-born Muslims in Australia, at 14.7 percent. Urdu is one of the most common languages in Pakistani households, and Sydney has the largest Pakistani community in Oceania. Western Suburbs of Sydney are home to biggest Pakistani Community in Australia. Some noticeable suburbs with significantly higher population of Pakistani Diaspora and Individuals born in Pakistan include Auburn, Lakemba, Wiley Park, Mount Druitt, Rooty Hill and Plumpton. Auburn Road in Auburn is also Referred as “ LITTLE PAKISTAN “ by locals because of significant presence of Pakistani Community and Pakistani owned businesses including restaurants and supermarkets . In June 2017, 76,590 Pakistani-born individuals were living in Australia. As of June 2018, the population was recorded at 84,340 by the ABS. In 2019, the population grew by eight percent to 91,000.

According to the 2006 Census in Victoria, there were an estimated 4,703 Pakistani born persons, with the majority living in Melbourne. The number has since tripled from the previous census which was in 1996. Those living in Victoria that are Pakistani-born are highly educated with more than a third working in professional positions and about half working in 'clerical, production, service, transport and sales positions'.

In 2012, 7,400 Pakistani international students were studying in Australia, an increase from close to 5,000 in 2007. Under the Australia-Pakistan Scholarship Program, 500 scholarships were available to Pakistani students from 2005 to 2010 to facilitate postgraduate studies in Australia. Australia has become one of the largest markets for Pakistani students outside the United States and United Kingdom.

Around 1,000 Pakistanis live in the federal capital, Canberra.

=== Education and qualifications ===
Pakistani Australians tend to be urban, well-educated, and professional. Most of them migrate from large cities like Karachi, Lahore, Islamabad, Rawalpindi, Hyderabad, Multan and Peshawar, and tend to be familiar with Western culture and ways of living. According to the Department of Immigration and Border Protection, around 50 percent of Pakistani-born Australians hold an undergraduate degree or higher qualification, compared to the national average of 20 percent. Similarly, 52 percent of Pakistanis fall within the age bracket of 22 to 44 years. Occupationally, 29 percent of Pakistanis are employed as professionals, 10 percent are in managerial roles, 12 percent are involved in clerical and administration roles, another 12 percent are involved in community work and personal services, nine percent are sales workers, while 13 percent are drivers/machine operators, 8 percent are labourers and 7 percent are tradespeople.

=== Religion ===
Religion of Pakistani Australians
1. Islam (92.2%)
2. Catholic (1.90%)
3. Hinduism (0.90%)
4. Others (5.10%)

In 2021, 92.2% from Pakistani Australians (89,633 people in 2021) identified as Muslim, 1.9% as Catholic, 3.3% as Atheist, 0.9% as Hindus and 1.8% as Other religion.

== See also ==
- Australia–Pakistan relations
- Australians in Pakistan
- Indian Australian
- Bangladeshi Australian
- Punjabi Australians
- Sindhi Australians
- Hazara Australians
- Baloch Australians
- Pakistani New Zealanders
