= Vietnamese New Zealanders =

Total population
- 10,086

Regions with significant populations
- Auckland, Wellington, Christchurch

Languages
- Vietnamese, New Zealand English, languages of New Zealand

Religion
- Buddhism, Christianity

Related ethnic groups
- Vietnamese people, Vietnamese Australians

Vietnamese New Zealanders (Vietnamese: Người New Zealand gốc Việt) are New Zealanders of partial or full Vietnamese ancestry.

According to the 2018 census, 10,086 New Zealanders identify themselves as with the Vietnamese ethnic group. Many of them came to New Zealand to escape religious persecution or war.

== History ==
Vietnamese people began arriving in New Zealand during the mid-1970s and early 1980s as refugees following the end of the Vietnam War owing to fear of persecution or uncertainty under a new Communist government. New Zealand was one of the countries that assisted in the resettlement of Vietnamese refugees, with the first arrivals in 1977 when 412 refugees were accepted. The largest intake of Vietnamese refugees occurred in 1979–1980 when about 1,500 arrived with approximately 4,500 Vietnamese being accepted for resettlement between 1977 and 1993. Many of them settled in large urban areas. Owing to the economic troubles of the 1980s in which many had lost their factory jobs and isolation, about 1/3 of the population moved to Australia where there were larger Vietnamese communities.

Currently, in the 2018 Census, there are 10,086 Vietnamese living in New Zealand, with the majority being concentrated in Auckland, Wellington, and Christchurch.

== Notable Vietnamese New Zealanders ==
- Lan Pham, politician and ecologist.
- Kaelin Nguyen, professional footballer

== See also ==
- New Zealand–Vietnam relations
- Vietnamese diaspora
- Immigration to New Zealand
- Asian New Zealanders
- Vietnamese Australians
