= Indian Australians =

Australian residents and citizens of Indian ancestry

Total population
- 976,000 (by ancestry, 2021) (3.8% of the Australian population); 916,330 (by birth, 2024)

Regions with significant populations
- Melbourne, Sydney, Perth, Brisbane, Adelaide, Woolgoolga and Regional Victoria

Languages
- Punjabi • Hindi • Other Indian Languages • Australian English

Religion
- Hinduism (45%) Sikhism (20.8%) Christianity (15.6%) Islam (6.6%) Buddhism , Jainism, and other Indian Religions (9.9%) Irreligion (7.4%)

Related ethnic groups
- Punjabi Australians, Bangladeshi Australians, Pakistani Australians, Nepalese Australians, Sri Lankan Australians, Indian New Zealanders, British Indians, Indian Canadians, Indian Americans, other Overseas Indian Diaspora

Indian Australians or Indo-Australians are a subgroup of the Indian diaspora residing in Australia. This includes both those who are Australian by birth, and those born in India or elsewhere in the diaspora. Indian Australians are now one of the largest groups of the Indian diaspora, with 783,958 persons declaring Indian ancestry at the 2021 census, representing 3.1% of the Australian population, and 673,352 stating that they were born in India. If all "Indian-related ancestries" (Note: Defined as "Anglo-Indian, Fijian Indian, Gujarati, Indian, Indian Tamil, Kashmiri, Malayali, Parsi, Punjabi, Sikh, and Telugu") are grouped together, that number rises to 970,000, or 3.8% of the country's population. Furthermore, by June 2024, the Australia Bureau of Statistics reported that the Indian-born population had risen to 916,330 individuals, an increase of nearly 150,000 in 3 years.

Having long been restricted from entry under the White Australia policy, the number of Indians in Australia has increased exponentially in the 21st century. Indians now form the fastest-growing community both in terms of absolute numbers and percentages in Australia, and also have the youngest average age (34 years). As of 2016, Indians were the highest-educated migrant group in Australia, with 54.6% of Indians in Australia having a bachelor's or higher degree, more than three times the Australian national average.

In the 2021 Australian census, 1,217,575 individuals declared speaking a South Asian language. Punjabi (ranked 6th with 0.94% of total population) and Hindi (ranked 8th with 0.78% of total population) are among the top 10 languages spoken in Australia. As of 2018, the main Indic religions in Australia, whose adherents also include non-Indians, are Buddhism (2.4% of total population or 563,700 people), Hinduism (1.9% or 440,300) and Sikhism (0.5% or 125,900).

== History ==
=== Pre-history migration of Indians (2300 BC–2000 BC) ===
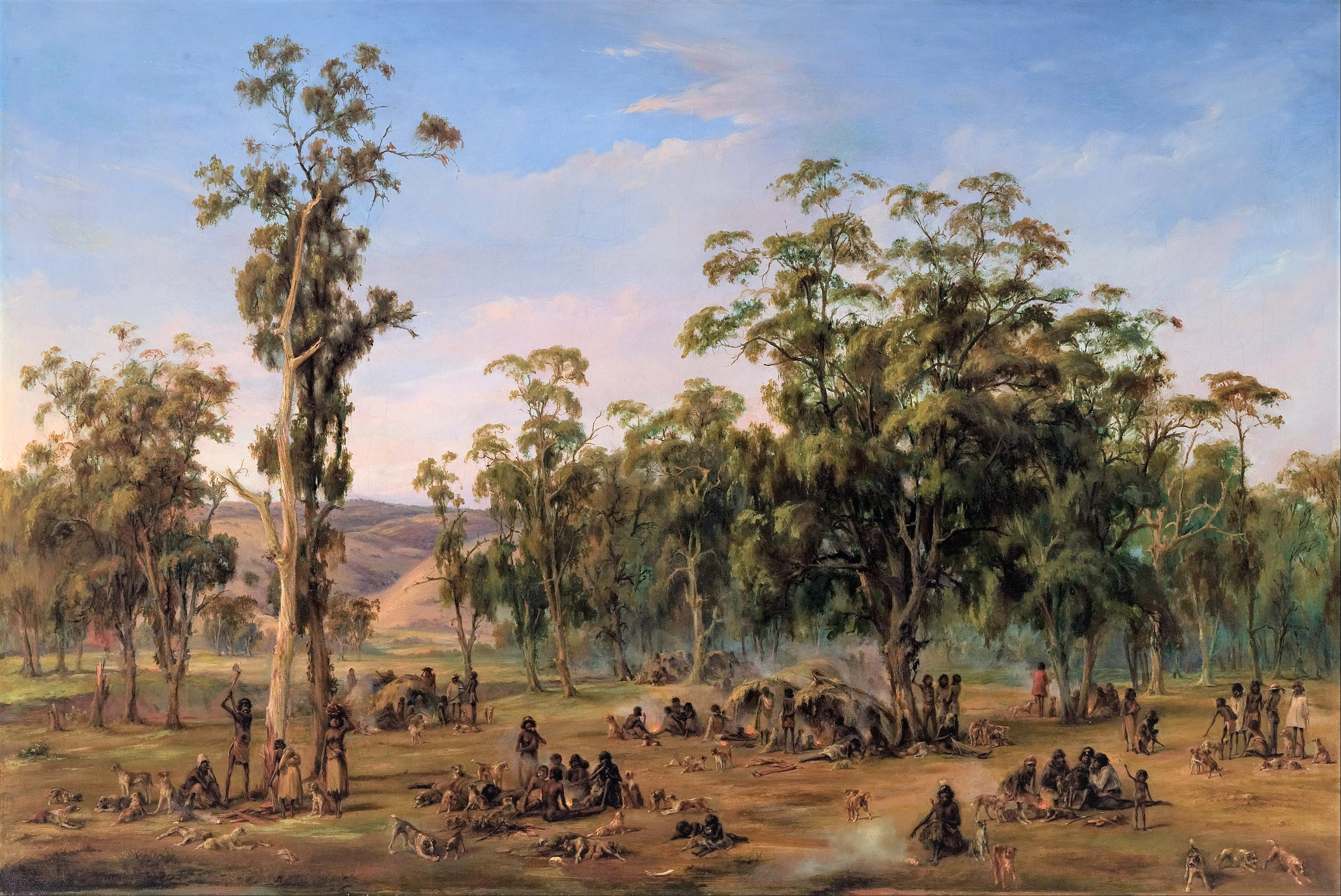
An Aboriginal encampment, near the Adelaide foothills

A study of Indigenous Australian DNA has found that Indigenous Australians may have mixed with people of Indian origin about 4,200 years ago. The same study showed that flint tools and Indian dogs may have been introduced from India at about this time. A 2012 paper reports that there is also evidence of a substantial genetic flow from India to northern Australia estimated at slightly over four thousand years ago, a time when changes in tool technology and food processing appear in the Australian archaeological record, suggesting that these may be related. One genetic study in 2012 by Irina Pugach and colleagues at the Max Planck Institute for Evolutionary Anthropology has suggested that about 4,000 years before the First Fleet landed in Australia (in 1788), some Indian explorers had settled in Australia and assimilated into the local population in roughly 2217 BC. The study by the Max Planck Institute for Evolutionary Anthropology found that there was a migration of genes from India to Australia around 2000 BC. The researchers had two theories for this: either some Indians had contact with people in Indonesia who eventually transferred those genes from India to Aboriginal Australians, or that a group of Indians migrated all the way from India to Australia and intermingled with the locals directly.

=== Indian connection with European exploration of Australia (1627–1787) ===
Most early explorations of Australia by various European colonial powers had an Indian connection. Indians had been employed for a long time on the European ships trading in Colonial India and the East Indies. Many of the early voyages to the Pacific either started or terminated in India and many of these ships were wrecked in the uncharted waters of the South Pacific. In 1606, the Dutch East India Company's ship, Duyfken, led by Willem Janszoon, made the first documented European landing in Australia. In 1627 the south coast of Australia was accidentally discovered by the Dutch East India Company explorer François Thijssen and named 't Land van Pieter Nuyts, in honour of the highest ranking passenger, Pieter Nuyts, extraordinary Councillor of India. In 1628 a squadron of Dutch East India Company ships was sent by the Governor-General of the Dutch East Indies Pieter de Carpentier to explore the northern coast. These ships made extensive examinations, particularly in the Gulf of Carpentaria, named in honour of de Carpentier.

Alexander Dalrymple (1737–1808), the Examiner of Sea Journals for the British East India Company, whilst translating some Spanish documents captured by Indian sepoys during the 1762 CE occupation of Philippines by the British India, found Portuguese navigator Luis Váez de Torres's testimony which led Dalrymple to discover and publish in 1770–1771 the existence of an unknown continent which he named as Terra Australis (or Southern Continent), this aroused widespread interest and prompted the British government in 1769 to order James Cook in HM Bark Endeavour to seek out the Southern Continent, which was discovered in June 1767 by Samuel Wallis in HMS Dolphin and named by him King George Island. The London press reported in June 1768 that two ships would be sent to the newly discovered island and from there to "attempt the Discovery of the Southern Continent". The British East India Trade Committee recommended in 1823 that a settlement be established on the coast of northern Australia to forestall the Dutch, and Captain J.J.G. Bremer, RN, was commissioned to form a settlement between Bathurst Island and the Cobourg Peninsula.

=== Colonial era (1788–1900) ===
'Podgy', a Sikh hawker in Goulburn Valley, Victoria

Indian immigration from British India to Australia began early in history of Australian colony. The first Indians arrived in Australia with the British settlers who had been living in India.

The people of the first British fleet to establish a new colony, which landed on 26 January 1788, included seamen, marines and their families, government officials, and a large number of convicts, including women and children. All had been tried and convicted in Great Britain and almost all of them in England. However, many are known to have come to England from other parts of Great Britain and, especially, from Ireland; at least 12 were identified as black (born in India, Britain, Africa, the West Indies, North America, or a European country or its colony). In 1788, Indian crews from Bay of Bengal came to Australia on trading ships. After establishment of first European colony in Sydney in Australia in 1788 by the colonial British Indian Empire under the British East India Company, the company had exclusive right on control of all trade to and from the penal colony. These colonies multiplied and expanded to include whole Australia, various Islands in Oceania, initially colonies were established under the British Indian Empire including New Zealand which was administered as part of New South Wales until 1841.

Between 1788 and 1868 on board 806 ships in all about 164,000 convicts were transported to the Australian colonies, 1% were from the British outposts in India and Canada, Maoris from New Zealand, Chinese from Hong Kong and slaves from the Caribbean. British colonial convict ships from Britain and elsewhere to Australia frequently stopped over in India, many of which were built in India, and among those ships with convicts started the initial sail from India include HMS Duchess of York which sailed from Bengal in India and arrived at Port Jackson on 4 April 1807 carrying merchandise and rice also transported two military convicts, Hunter arrived on 20 August 1810, Indian arrived on 16 December 1810, Amboyna arrived in Australia on 1 January 1822, Cawdry arrived on 1 January 1826 from India and Ceylon, Edward Lombes on 6 January 1833, and Swallow arrived on 23 October 1836. Almorah sailed from Britain and stopped over at Madras and Bengal in 1818.

In the late 1830s, more Indians started to arrive in Australia as indentured labourers when the penal transport of convicts to New South Wales (which at the time also consisted of Queensland and Victoria) was slowing, before being abolished altogether in 1840. The lack of manual labourers from the convict assignment system led to an increase demand for foreign labour, which was partly filled by the arrival of Indians who came from an agrarian background in India, and thus fulfilled their tasks as farm labourers on cane fields and shepherds on sheep stations well. In 1844, P. Friell who had previously lived in India, brought 25 domestic workers from India to Sydney and these included a few women and children. Among the earliest Indians was a Hindu Sindhi merchant, Shri Pammull, who after arrived in 1850s built a family opal trade in Melbourne which still prosperously continues with his fourth-generation descendants. "Initially, the migrants from India were indentured labourers, who worked on sheep stations and farms around Australia. Some adventurers followed during the gold rush of the 1850s. A census from 1861 indicates that there were around 200 Indians in Victoria of whom 20 were in Ballarat, the town which was at the epicenter of the gold rush. Thereafter, many more came and worked as hawkers - going from house to house, town to town, traversing thousands of kilometers, making a living by selling a variety of products."

From the 1860s, Indians, most of them Sikh, worked as merchants, industrialists, and businessmen to operate throughout outback Australia, as 'pioneers of the inland'. The 1881 census records 998 people who were born in India but this had grown to over 1700 by 1891.

Between 1860s to 1900 period when small groups of cameleers were also shipped in and out of Australia at three-year intervals, to service South Australia's inland pastoral industry by carting goods and transporting wool bales by camel trains, who were commonly referred to as "Afghans" or "Ghans", despite their origin often being mainly from British India, and some even from Afghanistan and Egypt and Turkey. Majority of cameleers, including Indian cameleers, were Muslims with a sizeable minority were Sikhs from Punjab region, they set up camel-breeding stations and rest house outposts, known as caravanserai, throughout inland Australia, creating a permanent link between the coastal cities and the remote cattle and sheep grazing stations until about the 1930s, when they were largely replaced by the automobile.

=== Since Federation (1901–present) ===
==== During the White Australia policy ====
From federation in 1901 until the 1960s, immigration of non-Europeans, including Indians, into Australia was restricted due to the enactment of the White Australia policy. The laws made it impossible for Indians to enter the country unless they were merchants or students, who themselves were only allowed in for short periods of time. Historians place the number of Indians in Australia at federation in 1901 somewhere between 4700 and 7600. According to the 1911 census, there were only 3698 'Indians' signifying a large decrease, with the trend continuing, with only approximately 2200 'Indians' in the country in 1921. After 1901 Immigration Restriction Act was introduced by the Australian Government the migration [of non-white migrants] from India was curtailed, but following India's independence from Britain in 1947, the number of Indian-born Anglo-western white British citizens emigrating to Australia increased, along with migration of mixed race European-Indians, such as Anglo-Indians, Dutch Anglo-Indians and Portuguese Indians. The 1901 Immigration Restriction Act, one of the first laws passed by the new Australian parliament, which was the centrepiece of the White Australia Policy aimed to restrict immigration from Asia, where the population was vastly greater and the standard of living vastly lower and was similar to measures taken in other settler societies such as the United States, Canada and New Zealand. While Labor Party wanted to protect "white" jobs and pushed for clearer restrictions, Free Trade Party's MP Bruce Smith said he had "no desire to see low-class Indians, Chinamen or Japanese...swarming into this country... But there is obligation...not (to) unnecessarily offend the educated classes of those nations".

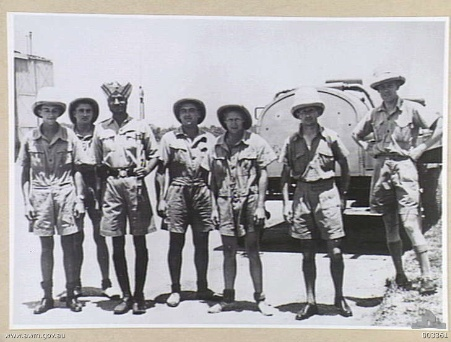
RAAF Personnel with an Indian Sikh man during WWII.

During World War I (1914–1918) Indian and Australian troops were deployed together in several sectors, including in Europe, Middle East, Africa, Egypt and Turkey. During Gallipoli Campaign the Australians and New Zealanders troops were deployed to take part in the operation, although they were outnumbered by the British, Indian and French contingents, a fact which is often overlooked today by many Australians and New Zealanders. Australian nurses also staffed 10 British colonial hospitals in India.

During World War II (1939–1945) the hundreds of Australians were posted to British units in Burma and India. Hundreds of Australians also served with RAF units in India and Burma, and in May 1943 330 Australians were serving in forty-one squadrons in India, of which only nine had more than ten Australians. In addition, many of the RAN's corvettes and destroyers served with the British Eastern Fleet where they were normally used to protect convoys in the Indian Ocean from attacks by Japanese and German submarines.

==== Under multiculturalism ====
The number of permanent settlers arriving in Australia from India since 1991 (monthly)

The end of White Australia policy saw a boom in migration of middle-class skilled professionals, by 2016 over 2 in every 3 migrants who arrived were skilled professionals mainly from India, UK, China, South Africa and Philippines, "to work as doctors and nurses, human-resources and marketing professionals, business managers, IT specialists, and engineers...who were not fleeing war or poverty. The Indians in Australia are predominantly male, while the Chinese are majority female." Indians are the largest migrant ethnic group in Melbourne and Adelaide, fourth largest in Brisbane, and likely to jump from third place to second place in Sydney by 2021. In Melbourne, Indian Australians primarily live in the outer western, middle-outer southeastern, and the outer northern areas, with large concentrations in the suburbs of Tarneit, Truganina, Craigieburn, Dandenong (The location of the city's Little India precinct), Clayton, Glen Waverley, Clyde North, and Pakenham, with high numbers in the CBD as well . In Sydney, Parramatta [and neighbouring suburbs such as Harris Park and Westmead, etc.] have higher concentration of migrants. By 2019, the number of Indians grew at nine times the annual national average growth, and number of overseas student visas and post-study work visas also exploded.

Between 2007 and 2010, the violence against Indians in Australia controversy took place, and a subsequent Indian Government investigation concluded that, of 152 reported racially motivated assaults against Indian students in Australia in 2009, 23 involved racial overtones. In the year 2007–2008, 1,447 Indians had been victims of crime including assaults and robberies in the state of Victoria in Australia. In either case, the Victorian police refused to release the data for public scrutiny, the stated reason being that it was "problematic: as well as 'subjective and open to interpretation'". Indian media have accused the Australian authorities of being denialist. On 9 June 2009, Indian Prime Minister, addressing the Indian Parliament said that "he was 'appalled' by the senseless violence and crime, some of which are racist in nature," Indian students held protests in Melbourne and Sydney, which were sparked by an earlier attack on Indians by Lebanese Australian men.

In 2017–18 India was the largest source of new permanent annual migrants to Australia since 2016, and overall third largest source nation of cumulative total migrant population behind England and China. 20.5%, or 33,310 out of 162,417 Australian permanent resident visas, went to Indians, who also additionally had 70,000 students were studying in Australian universities and colleges.

Caste divisions have also been reported within the Indian Australian community. A 2024 report by The Guardian described caste discrimination as one of the sources of social division within the diaspora, including allegations of discrimination in employment and social exclusion.

The attacker in the 2025 Bondi Beach shooting, Sajid Akram, was an Indian national with permanent residency who initially moved to Australia in 1998 on a student visa.

== Demographics ==
People with Indian ancestry as a percentage of the population in Sydney divided geographically by postal area, as of the 2011 census

783,958 persons declared Indian ancestry (whether alone or in combination with another ancestry) at the 2021 census, representing 3.1% of the Australian population.
In 2019, the Australian Bureau of Statistics estimated that 721,050 Australian residents were born in India.

At the 2021 census the states with the largest number of people nominating Indian ancestry were: New South Wales (350,770), Victoria (250,103), Queensland (93,648), Western Australia (77,357) and South Australia (43,598).

In 2009 there were an additional 90,000 Indian students studying at Australian tertiary institutions according to Prime Minister Rudd.

=== Historical population trends ===
This table only reflects the people who were born in India, and not all the people who have the Indian ancestry such as the second generation Indian Australians or the first generation Indian Australians from Indian diaspora nations e.g. Fiji, Singapore, Malaysia, Hong Kong, Suriname, Guyana, etc. Prior to 1947 India's Independence and simultaneous partition, the Pakistani Australian and Bangladeshi Australian as nations did not exist as these were part of British India, hence these are also included in the demography of Australian Indians till 1947.

Year	Born in India		All overseas born		Notes
Year	Number	% of Indians among overseas born	Number	% of all overseas born in total population of Australia	and comments
26 January 1788	12*				People of the first British fleet included 12 non-European people including some Indians.
1881	998				
1891	1700				
1901	4700 to 7600				Introduction of White Australia policy led to reduction of Indians.
1911	3698				
1921	2200				
Before 1941	170	0.1	16,681	0.3	
1941–1950	2,027	0.7	106,647	2.0	
1951–1960	1,697	0.6	375,076	7.1	
1961–1970	10,319	3.5	642,355	12.1	End of the White Australia policy in 1973.
1971–1980	11,595	3.9	571,828	10.8	
1981–1990	17,659	6.0	782,926	14.8	
1991–2000	36,765	12.4	786,777	14.9	
2001–2005	48,949	16.6	581,597	11.0	
2006–2011	159,326 (390,894)	52.9	1,190,322	22.5	390,894 are ethnic Indian and among them 295,362 were born in India.
2011–2016	592,000 (619,164)				619,164 (2.8% of Australian population) are ethnic Indian and among them 592,000 (2.4% of Australian population) were born in India.
2016–2021					
2022–2027					

=== Indian languages ===
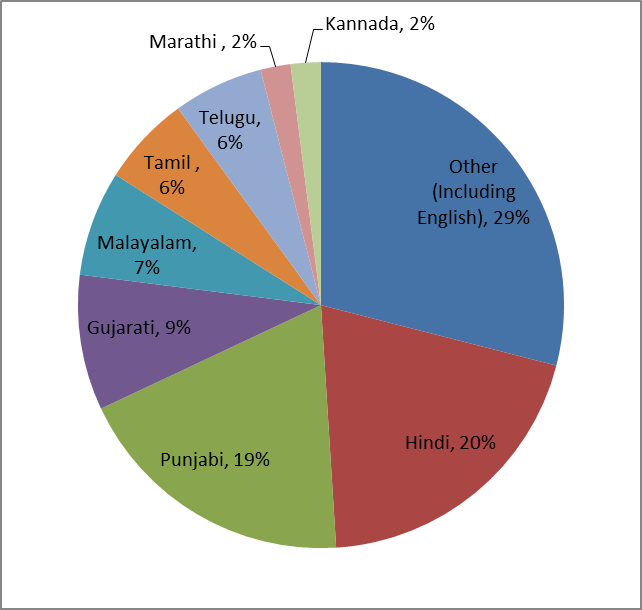
Languages spoken by Indian Australians at home as of 2011

Hindi and Punjabi languages, with 159,652 and 132,496 speakers, are among top 10 language spoken at home in Australia. Other Indian languages and their respecting speaker in Australia are Tamil (73,161), Bengali (54,566), Malayalam (53,206), Gujarati (52,888), Telugu (34,435), Marathi (13,055), Kannada (9,701), Konkani (2,416), Sindhi (1,592), Kashmiri (215), and Odia (721). Number of Hindi speakers by state in 2018, were NSW (67,034), Victoria (51,241), Queensland (18,163), Western Australia (10,747), South Australia (7,310), ACT (3,646), NT (852), and Tasmania (639). 81% of Punjabi speakers are Sikhs, 13.3% are Hindus and 1.4% are Muslims.

=== Religion ===
Religion amongst Indian Australians (2021)
Religion	Percent
Hinduism	45.0%
Sikhism	20.8%
Catholicism	10.3%
Other religion	9.9%
No religion	7.4%
Islam	6.6%

Indian Australian demography by religion (note that it includes only Indian born in India and not australian with an Indian background)
Religious group	2021 (Note: Religious breakdown proportions based on "Indian" ethnic or cultural origin response on the 2021 census.)		2016 (Note: Religious breakdown proportions based on "Indian" ethnic or cultural origin response on the 2016 census.)		2011 (Note: Religious breakdown proportions based on "Indian" ethnic or cultural origin response on the 2011 census.)	
Religious group	Pop.	%	Pop.	%	Pop.	%
Catholic	71,135 ▲	10.56% ▼	59,702 ▲	13.11% ▼	48,207	16.32%
Oriental Orthodox (predominantly Malankara Orthodox Syrian Church)	5,640 ▲	0.84% ▼	4,657 ▲	1.02% ▲	2,422	0.82%
Protestantism and Other Christian denomination	28,205 ▲	4.19% ▼	23,009▲	5.05% ▼	19,234	6.51%
(Total Christian)	104,980 ▲	15.59% ▼	87,368 ▲	19.19% ▼	69,863	23.65%
Hinduism	343,571 ▲	51.02% ▲	224,610 ▲	49.32% ▲	139,633	47.28%
Buddhism	2,388 ▲	0.35% ▲	1,489 ▲	0.33% ▼	1,196	0.4%
Irreligion	26,810 ▲	3.98% ▲	16,171 ▲	3.55% ▲	7,895	2.67%
Sikhism	148,806 ▲	22.1% ▲	93,120 ▲	20.45% ▲	55,312	18.73%
Islam	28,104 ▲	4.17% ▲	15,650 ▲	3.44% ▲	10,126	3.43%
Other	6,393 ▲	0.95% ▼	4,562 ▲	1% ▼	3,756	1.21%
Judaism	341 ▲	0.05% ▼	340 ▼	0.07% ▼	372	0.13%
Not stated	11,962 ▼	1.78% ▼	12,085 ▲	2.65% ▲	7,398	2.5%
Total Indian Australian population	673,352 ▲	100%	455,385 ▲	100%	295,362	100%

Indian Australian demography by religion (Ancestry included)
Religious group	2021		2016		2011	
Religious group	Pop.	%	Pop.	%	Pop.	%
Catholic	165,603▲	11.36% ▼	140,896 ▲	13.11% ▼	107,451	15.66%
Oriental Orthodox (predominantly Malankara Orthodox Syrian Church)	12,779 ▲	0.88% ▼	11,109 ▲	1.03% ▲	5,518	0.8%
Protestantism and Other Christian denomination	73,211 ▲	5.02% ▼	61,676 ▲	5.74% ▼	48,449	7.06%
(Total Christian)	251,593▲	17.26% ▼	213,681▲	19.89% ▼	161,418	23.52%
Hinduism	740,050 ▲	50.78% ▲	525,534 ▲	48.91% ▲	326,820	47.62%
Buddhism	4,636 ▲	0.32% ▲	3,202 ▲	0.3% ▼	2,642	0.38%
Irreligion	93,724 ▲	6.43% ▲	56,228 ▲	5.23% ▲	27,341	3.98%
Sikhism	245,354 ▲	16.84% ▲	180,048 ▲	16.76% ▲	105,665	15.4%
Islam	83,717 ▲	5.74% ▲	54,454 ▲	5.07% ▲	34,515	5.03%
Other	14,202 ▲	0.97%	10,445 ▲	0.97% ▼	9,331	1.36%
Judaism	754 ▲	0.05% ▼	706 ▼	0.07% ▼	718	0.1%
Not stated	23,280▼	1.6% ▼	30,272 ▲	2.82% ▲	17,818	2.6%
Total Indian Australian population	1,457,305 ▲	100%	1,074,555 ▲	100%	686,261	100%

With 92.6% of Indian Australians being religious, Indian Australians are a much more religious group than Australia as a whole (Australia being 46.1% irreligious), but less religious than India itself which is 99.7% religious. While India is 79.8% Hindu, 14.2% Muslim, 2.3% Christian, and 1.7% Sikh, Indian Australians are 45.0% Hindu, 20.8% Sikh, 10.3% Catholic, and 6.6% Muslim, with a significant over-representation of Sikhs and Christians and an under-representation of Hindus and Muslims.

=== Politics ===
A 2022 survey by Carnegie Endowment for International Peace and Johns Hopkins University School of Advanced International Studies found that 43% of Indian Australians identified with the Australian Labor Party, The Coalition at 26% support, 15% with the Australian Greens, 5% for One Nation Party.

Federal opinion polling among Indian Australians
Year	Liberal	Labor	Greens	One Nation	Other
2025	38%	45%	8%	2%	6%
2026	33%	43%	9%	8%	5%

== Socio-economic status ==
In 2016, it was revealed 54.6% of Indian migrants in Australia hold a bachelor's degree or a higher educational degree, more than three times Australia's national average of 17.2% in 2011, making them the most educated demographic group in Australia.

India annually contributes the largest number of migrants to both Australia and New Zealand. According to census figures from 2016, among India-born residents in Australia, the median weekly income was $785, higher than the corresponding figure for all overseas-born residents at $615, and all Australia-born residents at $688.

A 2022 survey by Carnegie Endowment for International Peace and Johns Hopkins University School of Advanced International Studies found that 43% of Indian Australians identified with the Australian Labor Party, The Coalition at 26% support, 15% with the Australian Greens, 5% for One Nation Party.

== In popular media ==
"Indians and the Antipodes: Networks, Boundaries and Circulation" 2018 book edited by Sekhar Bandyopadhyay and Jane Buckingham "is the first book that seeks to juxtapose histories of Indian migration to Australia and New Zealand in a comparative framework to show their interconnectedness as well as dissimilarities. Side by side with stories of collective suffering and struggles of the diaspora, it focuses on individual resilience, enterprise and social mobility. It analyses 'White Australia' and 'White New Zealand' policies of the early twentieth century to point to their interconnected histories. It also looks critically at the more recent migration, its changing nature and the challenges it poses to both the migrant communities and the host societies."

== See also ==
- Australia–India relations
- Fijian-Indian Australians
- India Now, an Australian TV program focused on Indian topics
- Non-resident Indian and person of Indian origin
- Pakistani Australians
- Bangladeshi Australians
- Punjabi Australians
- Australian Sikh Heritage Trail
- Man Mohan Singh (pilot)
- Romani people in Australia
