= Bangladeshi New Zealanders =

নিউজিল্যান্ডীয় বাংলাদেশী

Total population
- 3,552 (2023)

Regions with significant populations
- Auckland

Languages
- New Zealand English · Bangladeshi English · Bengali

Religion
- Sunni Islam (majority) · Hinduism · Shia Islam

Related ethnic groups
- Asian New Zealanders · Bangladeshi diaspora

Bangladeshi New Zealanders (Bengali: নিউজিল্যান্ডীয় বাংলাদেশী) refers to New Zealand citizens or residents who are of full or partial Bangladeshi heritage or people who emigrated from Bangladesh and now reside in New Zealand. There are around 3,552 Bangladeshis in New Zealand, according to the census in 2023. The largest Bangladeshi communities are mainly present in Auckland with smaller communities in other cities such as Christchurch, Dunedin and Wellington.

== History ==
Bangladeshis are relatively recent migrants to New Zealand. Since 1970, migration from Bangladesh has steadily increased with the majority arriving under the Skilled Migration Program. Most Bangladesh-born have settled in the urban areas of Auckland while smaller numbers settled in other cities such as Christchurch, Dunedin and Wellington.

== Geographic distribution ==
=== 2018 census ===
The latest 2018 New Zealand census recorded 2,259 Bangladesh-descent people in New Zealand.

== See also ==
- Bangladesh–New Zealand relations
- Bangladeshi diaspora
- Immigration to New Zealand
- Asian New Zealanders
- Bangladeshi Australians
