= Sri Lankan New Zealanders =

Total population
- 23,661 (2023)

Regions with significant populations
- Most in Auckland, Wellington, with smaller populations in Waikato, Manawatū-Whanganui, Canterbury and elsewhere

Languages
- English, Sinhalese, Tamil

Religion
- 45.9% Buddhism; 23.9% Christianity; 16.1% Hinduism; 7.9% No religion 3.9% Islam

Related ethnic groups
- Sri Lankan people

Sri Lankan New Zealanders, also known informally as “Sriwis”, are New Zealanders of Sri Lankan heritage living in New Zealand. This includes at least three Sri Lankan ethnic groups in New Zealand: the Sinhalese, Sri Lankan Tamils and Burghers. Sri Lankans in New Zealand span over 140 years of emigration. In 2013, there were 9,579 Sri Lankans in New Zealand, increasing to 16,830 in 2018, and 23,661 in 2023.

== History ==
=== Early arrivals ===
The early arrivals who came to New Zealand from what was then British Ceylon were a few prospectors attracted to the gold rushes. By 1874, there were a mere 33 New Zealand residents born in Ceylon. Both New Zealand and Ceylon being part of the Commonwealth, New Zealand dutifully imported both people and commodities from Ceylon. After 1890, Ceylon began to surpass China as New Zealand’s supplier of tea. By 1901, the number of Ceylonese residents in New Zealand born in Ceylon had grown to 106.

=== 20th century ===
After 1950, under the Colombo Plan, some students and trainees received education in New Zealand. Up until the late 1960s, the number of New Zealand residents born in Ceylon remained static. As the demand for skilled professionals in New Zealand grew, it led to a noticeable increase in the number of immigrants around this time. Racial and economic tensions in Dominion of Ceylon, made worse after the declaration of the republic in 1972, also swelled immigrant numbers.

In 1983, the Sri Lankan Civil War began with Sinhalese political dominance being challenged by the militant Tamil Tigers, who sought a separate Tamil state within Sri Lanka. After the 1983 riots in Sri Lanka ushered in an extended civil war, many Sri Lankans, both Tamil and Sinhalese, fled Sri Lanka, and the number of arrivals from Sri Lanka to New Zealand and the Sri Lankan-born population in New Zealand rose dramatically.

=== Present ===
During the 1980s, New Zealand had relaxed its immigration policies towards Asians; it was seen as a welcoming destination and convinced them to emigrate permanently. Other Sri Lankans only found temporary employment in Africa and Saudi Arabia, intending to return to Sri Lanka. The number of arrivals continued to increase, and at the 2006 census, there were over 7,000 Sri Lankans living in New Zealand. By the end of the 2018 census, the Sri Lankan ethnic group population had increased to 16,830.

== Demographics ==
Population growth of Sri Lankan New Zealanders
1874	33
1901	106
1951	152
1976	973
2001	6,168
2006	7,257
2013	9,579
2018	16,830
2023	23,661
Source:Te Ara; Data is based on New Zealand Government Census.

There were 16,830 people identifying as being part of the Sri Lankan ethnic group (including Sinhalese and Sri Lankan Tamil) at the 2018 New Zealand census, making up 0.36% of New Zealand's population. This is an increase of 5,556 people (49.3%) since the 2013 census, and an increase of 8,517 people (102.5%) since the 2006 census. Some of the increase between the 2013 and 2018 census was due to Statistics New Zealand adding ethnicity data from other sources (previous censuses, administrative data, and imputation) to the 2018 census data to reduce the number of non-responses.

There were 8,082 females and 8,751 males, giving a sex ratio of 1.083 males per female. The median age was 32.9 years (compared with 37.4 years for New Zealand as a whole), with 3,411 people (20.3%) were aged under 15 years, 3,816 (22.7%) were 15 to 29, 8,247 (49.0%) were 30 to 64, and 1,362 (8.1%) were 65 or older.

In terms of population distribution, 59.3% of Sri Lankan New Zealanders lived in the Auckland region, 15.0% lived in the Wellington region, 13.1% lived in the remainder of the North Island, and 12.6% lived in the South Island. The Puketāpapa local board area of Auckland had the highest concentration of Sri Lankan people at 2.7%, followed by the Maungakiekie-Tāmaki local board area (1.3%) and the Whau and Ōrakei local board areas (both 1.2%). Lower Hutt City had the highest concentration of Sri Lankan people outside of Auckland at 0.8%. Seven districts recorded no Sri Lankan people in their respective areas: Great Barrier Island, Waitomo district, Kawerau district, Wairoa district, Tararua district, Buller district, and the Chatham Islands.

Out of the Asians, the Sri Lankans were the most likely to hold a formal qualification and to work in white-collar occupations. Sri Lankans mainly worked in health professions, engineering, business and property services, and the retail and manufacturing sectors, in large numbers. Most lived in Auckland and Wellington, with smaller populations in Waikato, Manawatū-Whanganui, Canterbury and others.

== Community ==
=== Organizations ===
- MalibanStreet - Sri Lankans in New Zealand share news, find local businesses, discover events, and help each other — all in one place.
- New Zealand Society for Peace, Unity and Humam Rights in Sri Lanka Incorporated (SPUR NZ)
- New Zealand Sri Lanka Foundation
- Sri Lankan Society of New Zealand
- New Zealand Sri Lanka Friendship Society
- New Zealand Tamil Society
- Sri Lankaramaya - New Zealand
- United Sri Lanka Association Inc (USLA)
- Auckland Lankan Students Association - The largest Sri Lankan Students association in New Zealand

== Culture ==
Sri Lankan New Zealanders predominantly speak English, with Tamil and Sinhalese sometimes spoken at home. Distinct observations include Sriwi Day, celebrated on 5 February between the national days of Sri Lanka and New Zealand. During this celebration both countries are honored through drinking Ceylon Tea with New Zealand milk and ritual ringing of the Tamil Bell.

== Notable Sri Lankan New Zealanders ==
- Mayu Pasupati - New Zealand domestic cricketer
- Rohana Ulluwishewa - Author
- Brannavan Gnanalingam - Author
- Ahi Karunaharan - Writer, director, actor and producer
- Vanushi Walters - MP and human rights lawyer
- Jehan Casinader - Journalist and television presenter
- Suranga Nanayakkara - Computer scientist and inventor
- Saraid de Silva- Writer
- Anne Perera- Food scientist and author

== Media ==
=== Radio ===
- Janma Bhoomi
- Voice of Sri Lanka
- Sawana

=== Newspaper ===
- NZLankaNews
- Srilankanz community newspaper

== See also ==
- Colombo Street
- Colombo Plan
