= Asylum Seeker Resource Centre =

Australian organization

- Formation: 8 June 2001
- Founder: Kon Karapanagiotidis
- Purpose: To offer support to people seeking asylum
- Headquarters: 214–218 Nicholson Street, Footscray, Melbourne, Australia
- Services: 40 programs
- CEO: Kon Karapanagiotidis
- Staff: 100+ (2022)
- Volunteers: 1000+ (2022)
- Website: asrc.org.au

The Asylum Seeker Resource Centre (ASRC) is an asylum seeker support organisation in Australia. The ASRC, based in Footscray, a suburb of Melbourne, Victoria, provides aid, justice and empowerment programs to over 1000 asylum seekers living in the community seeking refugee protection. The ASRC is run by a team of over 1000 volunteers and around 100 paid staff, and is headed by former university lecturer and lawyer Kon Karapanagiotidis OAM.

Soon after the centre was opened in June 2001, attention was brought to the general public to asylum seekers' issues by the "Tampa affair" in August of that year. This incident, when the Australian Government under Prime Minister John Howard refused to grant the Norwegian freighter MV Tampa permission to enter Australian waters after it had rescued 438 Afghan asylum seekers, prompted greater interest in the centre and led to more volunteers signing up.

== History ==
The ASRC was founded on 8 June 2001 by Kon Karapanagiotidis, a lawyer, who was at the time a lecturer in welfare studies at the Victoria University of Technology (now Victoria University). At the time there were many asylum seekers living in the community on the Bridging Visa E, a visa generally given to those "unlawfully" in the community who have to depart before the visa expires, though many are still appealing their case for asylum. Those on a Bridging Visa E are denied access to Medicare or Centrelink and do not have the right to work. Karapanagiotidis and his welfare students raised funds to create a small food bank for asylum seekers, opening on 8 June 2001. A non-profit enterprise, Grasslands Grocery and Information Cafe, provided the ASRC with two rooms free of rent above a disused shop in Footscray, Melbourne.

To accommodate the increase in the number of asylum seekers receiving assistance, volunteers and programs, the ASRC has moved a number of times since 2001. One of the first programs to be introduced was the English as a Second Language (ESL) Program, beginning in August 2001. The Australian Government provides up to 510 hours of free English tuition to newly arrived citizens under the Adult Migrant English Program. Due to visa conditions, however, not all asylum seekers were provided these classes.

After the Tampa incident in August 2001, an ASRC volunteer information evening in September 2001 had a high attendance. Soon afterwards, Karapanagiotidis, along with volunteer lawyers, began providing free legal services to assist with asylum claims. In early 2002, the ASRC launched a number of new services, such as the first health service for asylum seekers in Victoria as well as counselling and casework services. In that year, the ASRC received funding from the Myer Foundation to employ a full-time coordinator.

Over the next few years, the ASRC introduced several new services, including the Employment Program, Social and Recreation Program, the Volunteer Support Program, the Community Meals Program and the Detention Friendship Program.

In 2007, the ASRC moved to a larger space in West Melbourne, allowing for further expansion. Again, new services were introduced, including the Small Business and Social Enterprise Program, ASRC Catering, Kidzone, the Asylum Seeker Outreach Children's Playground, the Micro-Credit Scheme, Repatriation and the Post Detention Release Support Program.

In 2014, the ASRC moved to a still larger space at 214-218 Nicholson Street, Footscray.

== Mission and functions ==
The mission of the ASRC is to ensure that "all those seeking asylum in Australia have their human rights upheld and that those seeking asylum in our community receive the support and opportunities they need to live independently". Their core values are to "assist all asylum seekers regardless of race, religion, gender, health or sexuality". The ASRC says it does not means or merit test for access to its services. Rather, they "advocate for asylum seekers without fear or favour", working both at the personal and legislative level. They are focused on both empowering asylum seekers towards self-determination, as well as educating the community about asylum seekers.

=== Advocacy ===
While much of the work conducted by the ASRC is the provision of services to asylum seekers, it also advocates for the rights of asylum seekers, and runs a series of campaigns at any one time.

=== Social enterprise ===
ASRC Catering was launched in May 2005, with a team comprising workers from Sudanese, Indonesian, Sri Lankan, Afghani, Iraqi and Congolese backgrounds. It produces mainly vegan and vegetarian meals, and started by catering for community events and corporate functions. It has since expanded, catering for private functions, meal delivery, weddings and parties.

== Organisational structure ==
The ASRC is an independent non-profit organisation focused on supporting asylum seekers in Australia. It is governed by a board, as of 2022 chaired by Mike Sum.

== Awards and achievements ==
The centre has been widely recognised for its community and human rights contributions.

In 2003 they were awarded the Australian Human Rights Commission Community Award – "chosen due to the breadth and volume of their work and the day-to-day practical assistance provided to asylum seekers. They are a registered charity with no government funding."

In 2009 the centre was a finalist in the Victorian Premier's Community Volunteering Awards for the Community Volunteering Innovation Award (Metropolitan).

In 2010 the ASRC was the winner of the Westpac Kookaburra Award for an Outstanding Community Organisation, sponsored by Westpac bank and Our Community. Our Community recognised the ASRC for being a 'hardworking, largely volunteer-based organisation that is working to protect and uphold the human rights, wellbeing and dignity of asylum seekers.'

Also in 2010, the ASRC was a finalist in the Melbourne Awards program for Contribution to Community, Community Organisation Division, as 'the largest provider of aid, advocacy and health services for asylum seekers in Australia.'

As of 2011 the ASRC was featured on the Myer Foundation's Time Will Tell: Showcasing Stories of Good Philanthropy.

On a national level, through campaigning and grassroots action the ASRC has played a role in positive action for refugees, including in the release of 62% of children that were in detention by June 2011, and in the ending of the Temporary Protection Visa (which was since re-introduced in 2014 under the Abbott government), the end of the 45-day rule (the end of which has led to the right to work for a greater number of asylum seekers) and the closure of the Manus Regional Processing Centre and Nauru detention centre (which were re-opened in 2012 under the Gillard government.

On a state level, the ASRC has been influential in securing Victorian TAFE access for asylum seekers. The ASRC gained access to up to 300 subsidised TAFE places for eligible asylum seekers in Victoria.

In 2010, after successful lobbying from the ASRC along with other asylum seeker organisations, Victorian Public Transport concession cards and fares were made available to asylum seekers receiving aid from the ASRC, Hotham Mission or the Red Cross. Victoria is the first state to offer this support.

== People ==
=== Kon Karapanagiotidis (CEO) ===
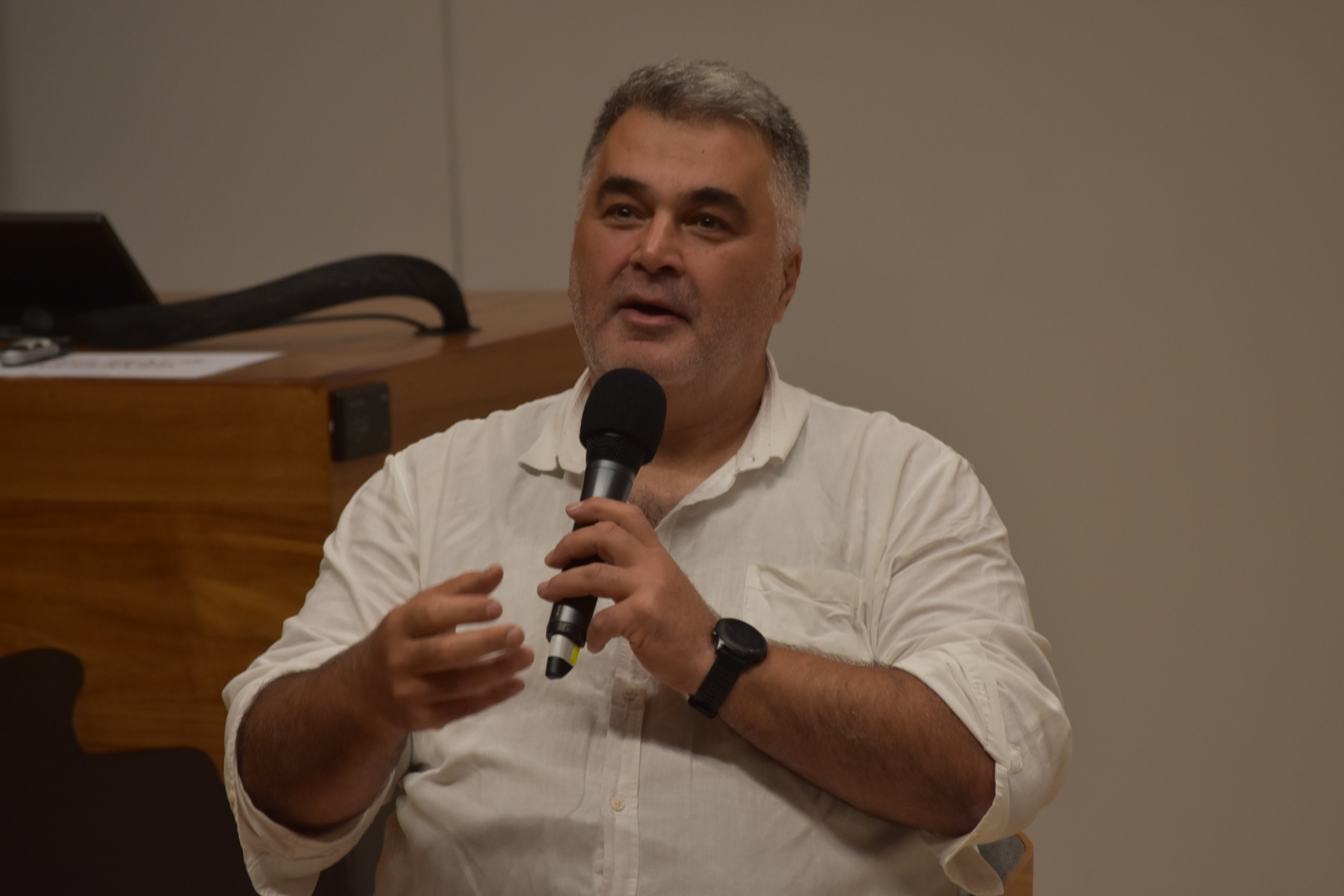
Karapanagiotidis in 2025 at Trinity College

Kon Karapanagiotidis is the founder and as of March 2022 CEO of the ASRC.

He was born in 1972 in Albury, and grew up in Mount Beauty. Growing up in a Greek household in country Victoria, with his own family being called 'not Australian', Discussing his family, he says he grew up "watching their experiences. Common experiences of all migrants racism, exclusion, discrimination, exploitation – very hard lives".

Karapanagiotidis started volunteering at a centre for homeless men when he was just 18, and continued to volunteer and many other charities. He also completed six university degrees, including law, social work and education. He was later recognised for his work, as the Young Achiever at La Trobe University Alumni Awards in 2011.

His work as CEO of ASRC has been widely recognised. In March 2008 he was invited to participate in the Australia 2020 Summit in 2008, an initiative of the Australian Government convened by then Prime Minister Kevin Rudd, and the Vice-Chancellor of the University of Melbourne, Professor Glyn Davis AC. In 2008 he was a finalist for Australian of the Year (Victoria), and in the same year was voted one of Australia's twenty unsung heroes as part of the launch of the new location of the National Portrait Gallery in Canberra.

He has been the recipient of a Churchill Fellowship, and was voted one of Melbourne 100 most influential people in The Age Melbourne Magazine.

In 2011, Karapanagiotidis was awarded the Order of Australia Medal for "For service to the community through refugee assistance organisations".

He is known for his provocative ways of bringing attention to asylum seeker issues, such as performing at the 2011 Melbourne International Comedy Festival, as well as elsewhere, as "The Hateful Humanitarian".

In 2015, four of the seven directors in the ASRC senior leadership team resigned, after complaining of a toxic work environment, mismanagement and bullying by Karapanagiotidis. The ASRC Board commissioned an independent report, which found no basis to the allegations, and, although he did not comment at the time, Karapanagiotidis has since strenuously denied that such a culture existed, although said that staff worked in a very high-stress environment.

In 2018 he published his memoir, The Power of Hope.

=== Pamela Curr ===
In 2010 Pamela Curr (ASRC Campaign Program Coordinator) was one of Who's Who Australian Women and in 2009 was admitted to the Victorian Women's Honour Roll. She trained as a nurse and a midwife before completing a Diploma of Welfare Studies and a Bachelor in Community Development at Victoria University.

Pamela was involved with the Fairwear Australia campaign for five and a half years, has worked with the Victorian Peace Network, is a national spokesperson for the Greens for Refugees, and is involved with the Civil Rights Network. According to the ABC Drum, Pamela "has worked in the past 15 years fighting for the human rights of first outworkers in the clothing industry and then for refugees and asylum seekers." Pamela writes articles for the ABC Drum, the Sydney Morning Herald, and Crikey about the detention of asylum seekers.

Together with the Baxter detainees, Curr 'found' Cornelia Rau in Baxter Detention Centre. Rua is an Australian Permanent Resident and German Citizen diagnosed with schizophrenia who was detained in Baxter for ten months in 2004–2005.

=== Patrons and ambassadors ===
As of 2022 ASRC patrons are listed as former High Court judge Michael Kirby AC CMG; writer and academic Eva Cox AO; Julian Burnside AO QC; and the late Malcolm Fraser AC CH, former Prime Minister of Australia.

Ambassadors include 2010 Australian of the year and mental health researcher Professor Patrick McGorry; authors Arnold Zable and Christos Tsiolkas; comedian Corinne Grant; Australian band The Cat Empire; Wally de Backer (Gotye); Susan Carland; and many others. In July 2017 Missy Higgins became an ambassador.

== Publications and productions ==
In 2011 the ASRC produced a short play Not Just My Story. Not Just My Story started with a series of dramatic and creative storytelling workshops with 30 asylum seekers and was performed in the 2011 Human Rights Arts and Film Festival. The play was directed by Brunswick Women's Theatre Director Catherine Simmonds in collaboration with Yumi Umiumare, Arnold Zable and Myles Mumford.

The ASRC runs a blog, Champions of Change, publishing articles and updates about asylum seeker events. The blog focuses on children in detention, refugee policy, and stories of asylum seekers living in the community and in detention.

In 2010, the ASRC published volume 1 of its Essays on Justice series, which included essays by Malcolm Fraser, Julian Burnside QC and Ana Pararajasingham.

In October 2010, the ASRC published a welfare paper, Destitute and Uncertain: the reality of seeking asylum in Australia. The purpose of this paper was to "educate, advocate and work constructively towards better practices and processes regarding the welfare needs to asylum seekers ... The paper outlines a best practice model for responding to the welfare needs of asylum seekers".

The ASRC published Locked Out: Position Paper on Homelessness of Asylum Seekers Living in the Community. This paper references the UNHCR's 2008 figures, which say that in 2007/08, 97.3% of the 4750 asylum seeker applications submitted in Australia came from people who arrived by plane and now live in the Australian community.

The ASRC publication A Case For Justice: Position Paper on the Legal Process of Seeking Asylum in Australia seeks to 'advocate, educate and work constructively towards better practices and processes in the refugee determination system. The numerous case examples are based on the real-life experiences of clients of the Asylum Seeker Resource Centre (ASRC) Legal Program, and reflect the experiences of many asylum seekers.'
