= Immigration to Australia =

People born overseas as a percentage of the population in Australia divided geographically by statistical local area, as of the 2011 census

Monthly arrivals of permanent settlers since 1976

The Australian continent was first settled when ancestors of Indigenous Australians arrived via the islands of Maritime Southeast Asia and New Guinea over 50,000 years ago.

European colonisation began in 1788 with the establishment of a British penal colony in New South Wales. Starting at independence in 1901, Australia maintained the White Australia policy for much of the 20th century, which forbade the entrance in Australia of people of non-European ethnic origins. Following World War II, the policy was gradually relaxed, and was abolished entirely in 1973. Since 1945, more than 7 million people have settled in Australia.

Between 1788 and the mid-20th century, the vast majority of settlers and immigrants came from Britain and Ireland (principally England, Ireland and Scotland), although there was significant immigration from China and Germany during the 19th century. In the decades immediately following World War II, Australia received a large wave of immigration from across Europe, with many more immigrants arriving from Southern and Eastern Europe than in previous decades. Since the end of the White Australia policy in 1973, Australia has pursued an official policy of multiculturalism, and there has been a large and continuing wave of immigration from across the world, with Asia being the largest source of immigrants in the 21st century. In 2019–20, immigration to Australia came to a halt during the COVID-19 pandemic, which in turn saw a shrinkage of the Australian population for the first time since World War I, though in the following period 2021–22 showed a very strong recovery of migrant arrivals.

Net overseas migration has increased from 30,042 in 1992–93 to 178,582 persons in 2015–16, 536,000 in 2022–23 declining to 309,000 in 2024–25 and is projected to be approximately 260,000 in the 2025-26 financial year. The largest components of immigration are the skilled migration and family re-union programs. A 2014 sociological study concluded that: "Australia and Canada are the most receptive to immigration among western nations." In 2023, BCG ranked Australia as the top country destination for individuals seeking to work and live a high-quality life based on global assessments.

Australia is a signatory to the Convention relating to the Status of Refugees and has resettled many asylum seekers. In recent years, Australia's policy of mandatory detention of unauthorised arrivals by boat has attracted controversy.

== Immigration history of Australia ==
The first migration of humans to the continent took place around 65,000 years ago via the islands of Maritime Southeast Asia and Papua New Guinea as part of the early history of human migration out of Africa.

=== Penal transportation ===
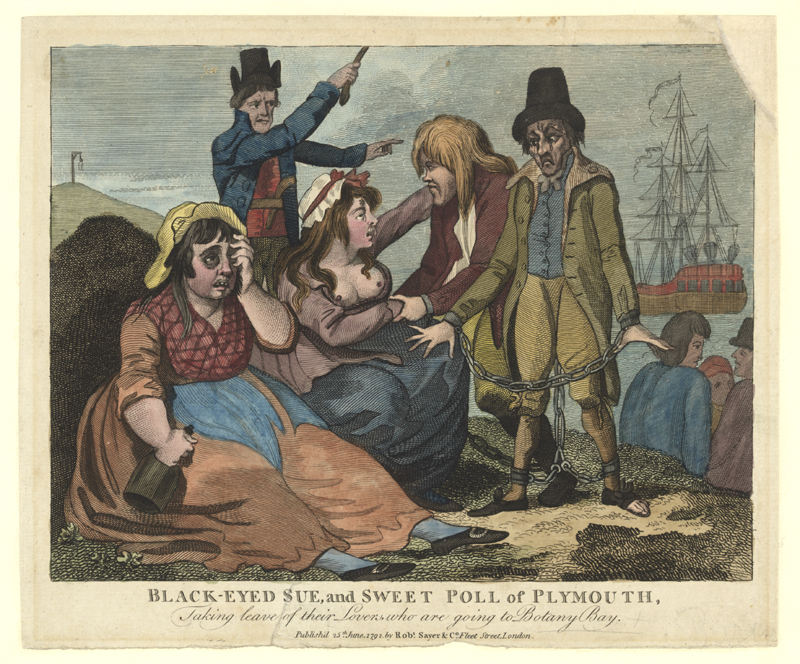
Women in England mourning their loved ones who are to be transported to the penal colony at Botany Bay, 1792

European migration to Australia began with the British convict settlement of Sydney Cove on 26 January 1788. The First Fleet comprised 11 ships carrying 775 convicts and 645 officials, members of the crew, marines, and their families and children. The settlers consisted of petty criminals, second-rate soldiers and a crew of sailors. There were few with skills needed to start a self-sufficient settlement, such as farmers and builders, and the colony experienced hunger and hardships. Male settlers far outnumbered female settlers. The Second Fleet arrived in 1790 bringing more convicts. The conditions of the transportation was described as horrific and worse than slave transports. Of the 1,026 convicts who embarked, 267 (256 men and 11 women) died during the voyage (26%); a further 486 were sick when they arrived of which 124 died soon after. The fleet was more of a drain on the struggling settlement than of any benefit. Conditions on the Third Fleet, which followed on the heels of the Second Fleet in 1791, were a bit better. The fleet comprised 11 ships. Of the more than 2000 convicts brought onto the ships, 173 male convicts and 9 female convicts died during the voyage. Other transport fleets bringing further convicts as well as freemen to the colony would follow. By the end of the penal transportation in 1868, approximately 165,000 people had entered Australia as convicts.

=== Bounty Immigration ===
The colonies promoted migration by a variety of schemes. The Bounty Immigration Scheme (1835-1841) boosted emigration from Britain to New South Wales. The plan was to pay for the passage of young married couples and single women with the long term goal of rapidly building the population of Australia, along the lines of Edward Gibbon Wakefield's proposals in 1829 for systematic colonization. Convicts would not be included. In 1835 governor Richard Bourke convinced NSW government to pay cash bounty to private shipping agents who handled the selection and transportation of the immigrants. Also in 1835 the South Australia Company was established for similar goals, but it worked poorly. The original NSW program was a success; it ended in 1841, but there were other forms of assisted immigration.

=== Gold rush and population growth ===
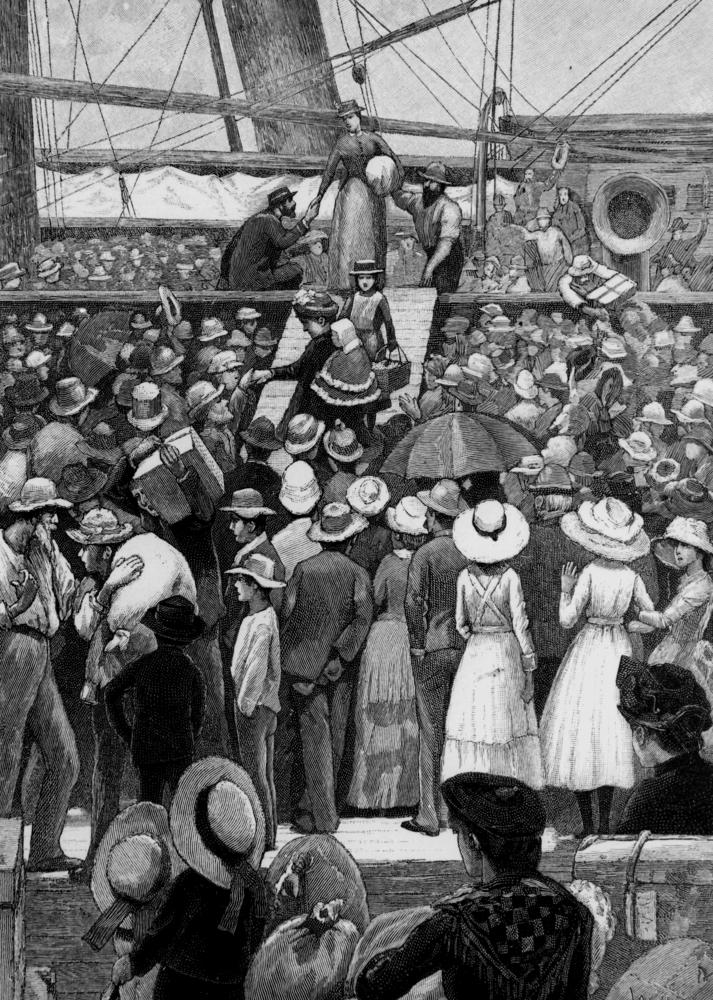
Migrants disembarking from a ship, c. 1885

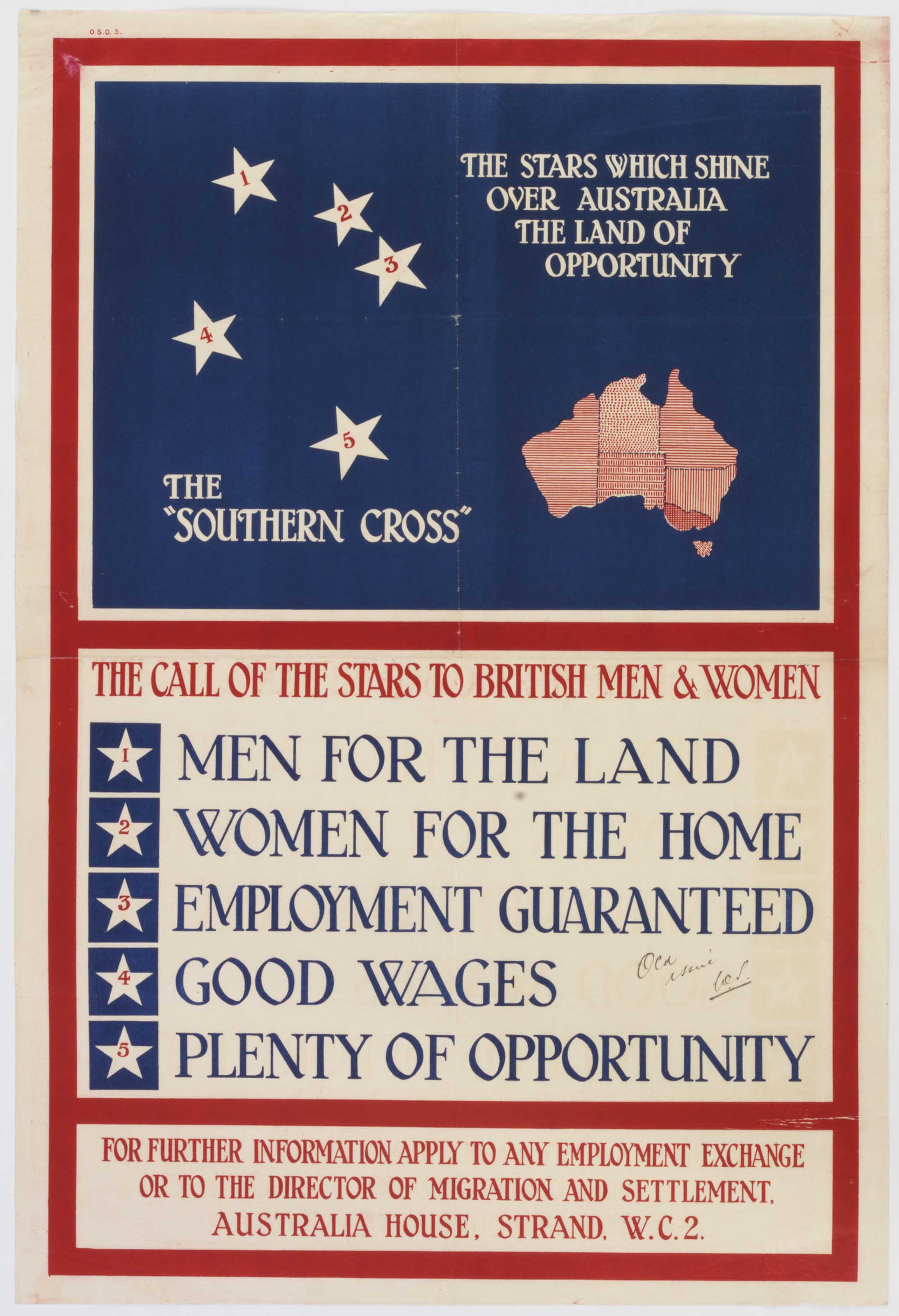
Australian Government poster issued by the Overseas Settlement Office to attract immigrants (1928).

The Gold Rush era, beginning in 1851, led to an enormous expansion in population, including large numbers of British and Irish settlers, followed by smaller numbers of Germans, other Europeans, and Chinese. This latter group was subject to increasing restrictions and discrimination, making it impossible for many to remain in the country. With the federation of the Australian colonies into a single nation, one of the first acts of the new Commonwealth Government was the Immigration Restriction Act 1901, otherwise known as the White Australia policy, which was a strengthening and unification of disparate colonial policies designed to restrict non-White settlement. Because of opposition from the British government, an explicit racial policy was avoided in the legislation, with the control mechanism being a dictation test in a European language selected by the immigration officer. This was selected to be one the immigrant did not know; the last time an immigrant passed a test was in 1909. Perhaps the most celebrated case was Egon Erwin Kisch, a left-wing Czechoslovak journalist who could speak five languages, who was failed in a test in Scottish Gaelic and deported as illiterate.

The government also found that if it wanted immigrants, it had to subsidise migration. The great distance from Europe made Australia a more expensive and less attractive destination than Canada and the United States. The number of immigrants needed during different stages of the economic cycle could be controlled by varying the subsidy. Before Federation in 1901, assisted migrants received passage assistance from colonial government funds. The British government paid for the passage of convicts, paupers, the military, and civil servants. Few immigrants received colonial government assistance before 1831. However, young women were receiving assisted passages from state governments to migrate to Australia in the early years of Federation.

Period	Annual average assisted immigrants
1831–1860	18,268
1861–1900	10,087
1901–1940	10,662
1941–1980	52,960

With the onset of the Great Depression, the Governor-General proclaimed the cessation of immigration until further notice. The next group to arrive were 5,000 Jewish refugee families from Germany in 1938. Approved groups such as these were assured of entry by being issued a Certificate of Exemption from the Dictation Test.

=== Post-war immigration to Australia ===
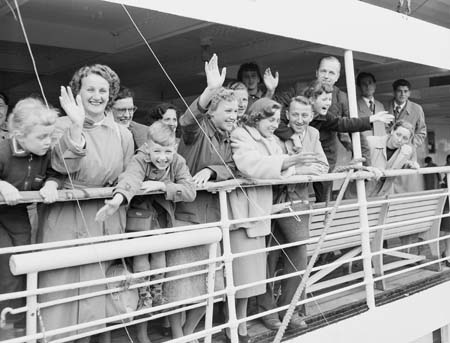
In 1954 the 50,000th Dutch migrant arrived in Australia.

After World War II, Australia launched a massive immigration program, believing that having narrowly avoided a Japanese invasion, Australia must "populate or perish". Hundreds of thousands of displaced Europeans migrated to Australia and over 1,000,000 British subjects immigrated under the Assisted Passage Migration Scheme, colloquially becoming known as Ten Pound Poms. The scheme initially targeted citizens of all Commonwealth countries; after the war it gradually extended to other countries such as the Netherlands and Italy. The qualifications were straightforward: migrants needed to be in sound health and under the age of 45 years. There were initially no skill restrictions, although under the White Australia Policy, people from mixed-race backgrounds found it very difficult to take advantage of the scheme.

In 1973, multiculturalism largely displaced cultural selectivity in immigration policy.

Net overseas migration reached a record level of 536,000 in 2022–23, up from 170,900 in 2021–22. Overall migration was 739,000 in 2022-23. Net permanent and long-term arrivals in the 12 months to May 2024 were a record 482,450.

Period	Migration programme
1998–99	68 000
1999–00	70 000 ▲
2000–01	76 000 ▲
2001–02	85 000 ▲
2002–03	108,070 ▲
2003–2004	114,360 ▲
2004–2005	120,060 ▲
2005	142,933 ▲
2006	148,200 ▲
2007	158,630 ▲
2008	171,318 ▲
2011	185,000 ▲
2012	190,000 ▲
2013	190,000
2015-2016	190,000
2016-2017	190,000
2017-2018	190,000
2018-2019	190,000
2023-2024	190,000

=== Overview ===
Foreign-born Australian residents by country of birth
#	1901		1954		2016	
1.	United Kingdom	495 504	United Kingdom	616 532	United Kingdom	1 087 756
2.	(United Kingdom) Ireland	184 085	Italy	119 897	New Zealand	518 462
3.	(German Empire) Germany	38 352	Germany	65 422	China	509 558
4.	(Qing dynasty) China	29 907	Poland	56 594	India	455 385
5.	(United Kingdom) New Zealand	25 788	Netherlands	52 035	Philippines	232 391
6.	Sweden-Norway	9 863	(Republic of Ireland) Ireland	47 673	Vietnam	219 351
7.	(United Kingdom) South Sea Islands	9 128	New Zealand	43 350	Italy	174 042
8.	(British Raj) India	7 637	Greece	25 862	South Africa	162 450
9.	United States	7 448	(Socialist Federal Republic of Yugoslavia) Yugoslavia	22 856	Malaysia	138 363
10.	Denmark	6 281	Malta	19 988	Sri Lanka	109 850
-	Other	47 463	Other	215 589	Other	2 542 443

== Current immigration programs ==
=== Migration program ===
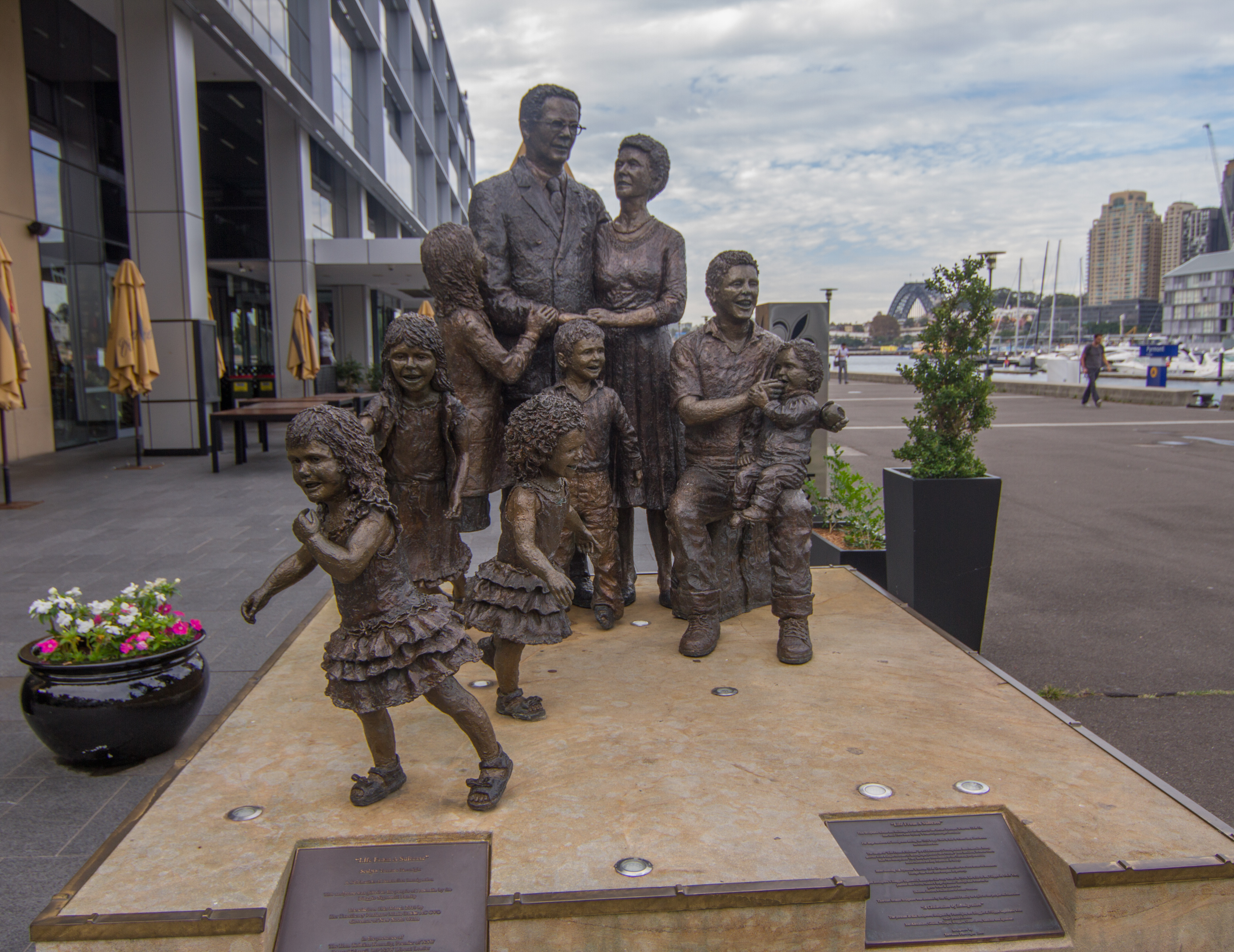
"Life From A Suitcase" sculpture installed at Pyrmont dedicated to immigrants in Australia

There are a number of different types of Australian immigration, classed under different categories of visa:

- Skilled Occupation visas - Australian working visas are most commonly granted to highly skilled workers. Candidates are assessed against a points-based system, with points allocated for certain standards of education. These visas are often sponsored by individual States, which recruit workers according to specific needs. Visas may also be granted to applicants sponsored by an Australian business. The most popular form of sponsored working visa was the 457 visa set in place in 1996 which has now been abolished by the Turnbull government and replaced with a similar; 482 Skills in Demand Visa.
- Student visas - The Australian Government actively encourages foreign students to study in Australia. There are a number of categories of a student visa, most of which require a confirmed offer from an educational institution.
- Family visas - Visas are often granted on the basis of family ties in Australia. There are a number of different types of Australian family visas, including Contributory Parent visas, Child Visa and Partner visas.
- Working holiday visa - This visa is a residence permit allowing travelers to undertake employment (and sometimes study) in the country issuing the visa to supplement education.
- Investor visas - Foreign investors could invest the business or fund in Australia to acquire the Permanent Residential of Australia, after 4 years (including the year which acquire the visa), they need to take the exam and make a declaration in order to be a citizen of Australia.

Employment and family visas can often lead to Australian citizenship; however, this requires the applicant to have lived in Australia for at least four years with at least one year as a permanent resident.

Claims have been made that Australia's migration program is in conflict with anti age-discrimination legislation and there have been calls to remove or amend the age limit of 50 for general skilled migrants.

New permanent migrants to Australia by region (2016–17)
Region	Number of migrants
Southern and Central Asia	58,232
North-East Asia	37,235
South-East Asia	31,488
North Africa and the Middle East	28,525
North-West Europe	25,174
Oceania and Antarctica	16,445
Sub-Saharan Africa	11,369
Americas	9,687
Southern and Eastern Europe	7,306
Supplementary and Not Stated	492

=== Humanitarian program ===
Australia grants two types of visa under its humanitarian program:

- Refugee-category visas for refugees under the Convention relating to the Status of Refugees
- Special Humanitarian Programme (SHP) visas for persons who are subject to substantial discrimination amounting to gross violation of their human rights in their home country

The cap for visas granted under the humanitarian program was 13,750 for 2015–16, plus an additional 12,000 visas available for refugees from the conflicts in Syria and Iraq.

=== Migration and settlement services ===
The Australian Government and the community provide a number of migration-assistance and settlement-support services:

- The Adult Migrant English Program, available to eligible migrants from the humanitarian, family and skilled-visa streams, provides free English-language courses for those who do not have functional English. Up to 510 hours of English language courses are provided during the first five years of settlement in Australia.
- The Department of Home Affairs operates a 24-hour, seven-days-a-week telephone-based interpreting service called the Translating and Interpreting Service National, which facilitates contact between non-English speakers and interpreters, enabling access to government and community services.
- The Settlement Grants Program provides funding to assist humanitarian entrants and migrants settle in Australia and to participate equitably in Australian society as soon as possible after arrival. The program is targeted to deliver settlement services to humanitarian entrants, family migrants with low levels of English proficiency and dependants of skilled migrants in rural and regional areas with low English-proficiency.
- The Australian Cultural Orientation program provides practical advice and the opportunity to ask questions about travel to and life in Australia to refugee and humanitarian visa holders who are preparing to settle in Australia. The program is delivered overseas over five days before the visa holder begins his or her journey.
- Refugee and humanitarian visa holders are also eligible to receive on-arrival settlement support through the Humanitarian Settlement Services program, which provides intensive settlement-support and equips individuals with the skills and knowledge to independently access services beyond the initial settlement period.
- The Immigration Advice and Application Assistance Scheme is a discontinued program that aimed at providing professional assistance, free of charge, to disadvantaged visa-applicants, to help with the completion and submission of visa applications, liaison with the department,
- In response to the needs of asylum seekers, the Asylum Seeker Assistance Scheme was established in 1992 by the Australian Government to address Australia's obligations under the Convention relating to the Status of Refugees. The Australian Red Cross administers the scheme under contract to the Department of Immigration and Citizenship. It provides financial assistance to asylum seekers in the community who satisfy specific eligibility criteria, and also facilitates access to casework assistance and to other support services for asylum seekers through the Australian Red Cross.
- A variety of community-based services cater to the needs of newly-arrived migrants, refugees, and asylum seekers. Some of these services, such as Migrant Resource Centres, receive funding from the Commonwealth Government.

== Country of birth of Australian residents ==
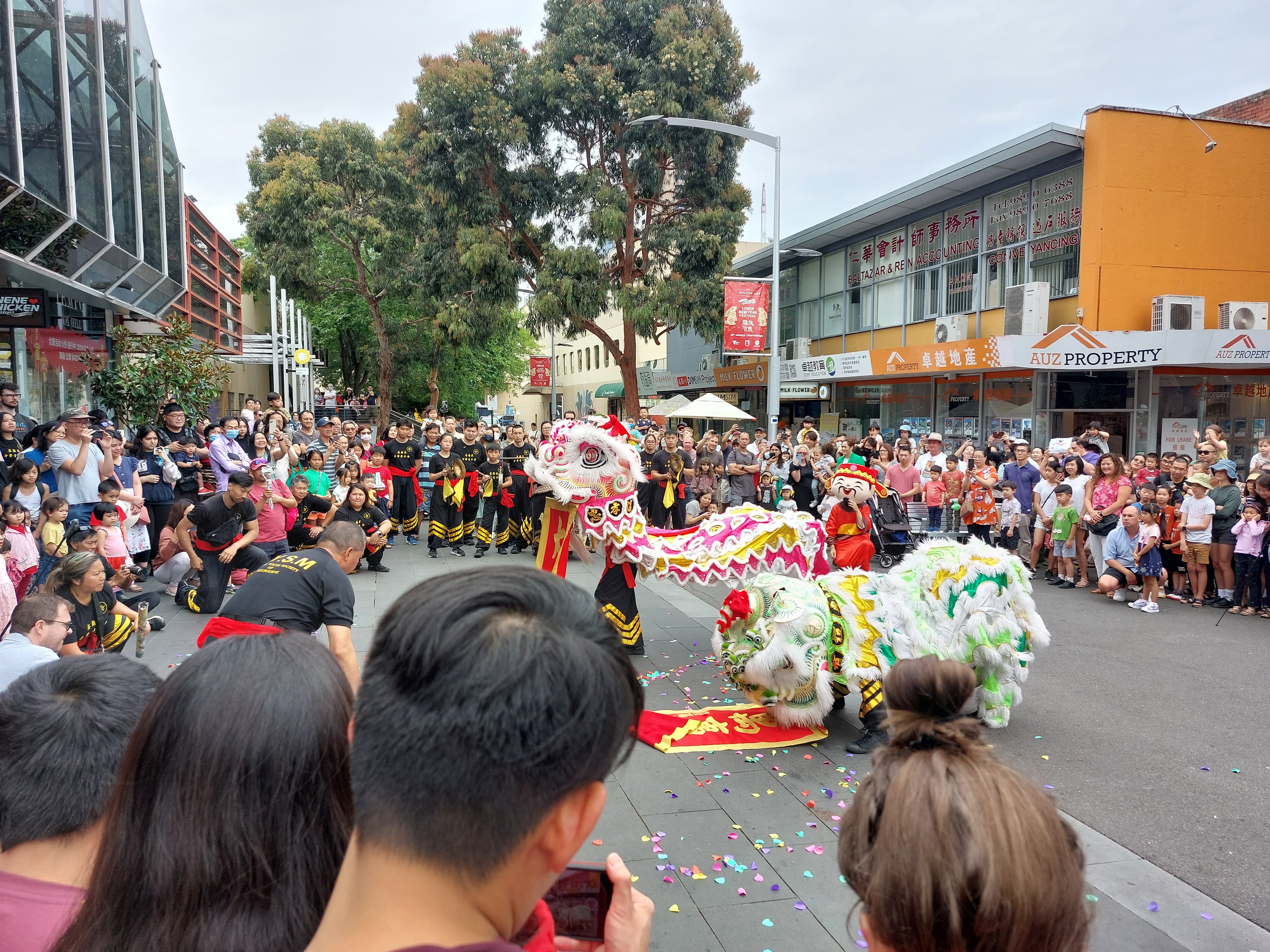
Chinese New Year celebrations at Box Hill, Victoria, home to one of the largest Chinese Australian communities in the country.

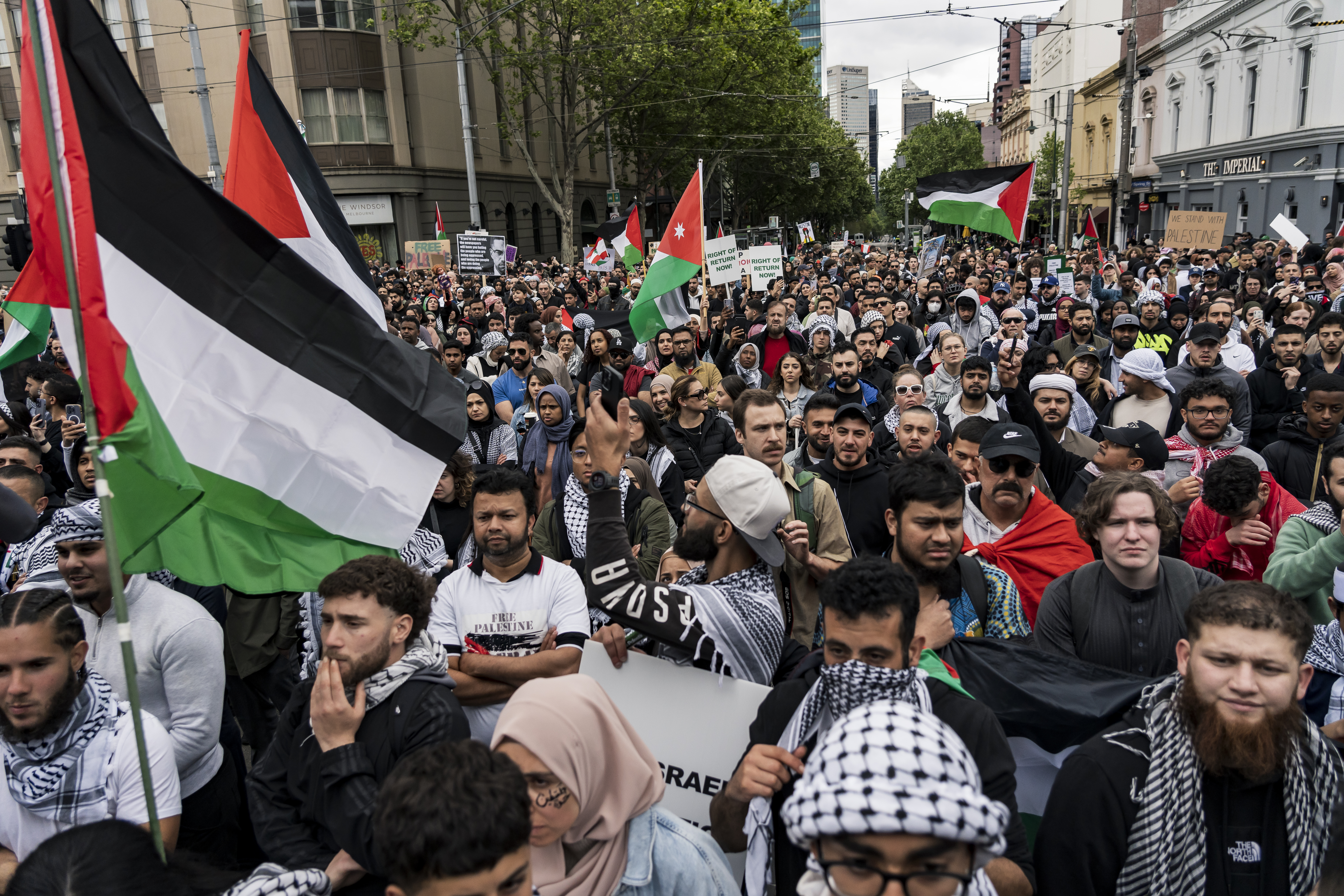
A majority of Muslims in Australia are of immigrant backgrounds consisting a diverse range of ethnic groups.

As of 2019, 30% of the Australian resident population, or 7,529,570 people, had been born overseas.

The following table shows Australia's population by country of birth as estimated by the Australian Bureau of Statistics in 2024. It shows only countries or regions or birth with a population of over 100,000 residing in Australia.

Source: Australian Bureau of Statistics (2024)
Place of birth	Estimated resident population (Note: Only countries with 100,000 or more are listed here.)
Total Australian-born	18,617,690
Total foreign-born	8,576,680
England (Note: The Australian Bureau of Statistics source lists England, Scotland, Wales and Northern Ireland separately although they are all part of the United Kingdom. These should not be combined as they are not combined in the source.)	1,000,000
India	916,330
China (Note: In accordance with the Australian Bureau of Statistics source, Mainland China, Taiwan and the Special Administrative Regions of Hong Kong and Macau are listed separately.)	700,120
New Zealand	617,960
Philippines	394,380
Vietnam	318,760
South Africa	224,160
Nepal	197,800
Malaysia	183,490
Sri Lanka	172,800
Italy	156,070
Pakistan	134,720
Scotland	124,880
Hong Kong	124,550
Indonesia	120,160
South Korea	119,190
United States	118,000
Thailand	114,280
Iraq	109,600
(Republic of Ireland) Ireland	103,080
Germany	102,960

The separate Australian States show some differences in settlement patterns, as demonstrated in the statistics compiled during the 2006 Census:

- New South Wales had the largest population, and the largest foreign-born population, in Australia (1,544,023). Certain nationalities concentrated notably in this state: 74.5% of Lebanese-born, 63.1% of Iraqi-born, 63.0% of South Korean-born, 59.4% of Fijian-born, and 59.4% of Chinese-born Australian residents lived in New South Wales.
- Victoria, the second-most populous state, also had the second-largest number of overseas-born persons (1,161,984). 50.6% of Sri Lankan-born, 50.1% of Turkish-born, 49.4% of Greek-born and 41.6% of Italian-born Australian residents lived in Victoria.
- Western Australia, with 528,827 overseas-born residents, had the highest proportion of foreign-born population. The state attracted 29.6% of all Singaporean-born Australian residents, and narrowly trailed New South Wales in having the largest population of British-born Australian residents.
- Queensland had 695,525 overseas-born residents, and attracted the greatest proportion of persons born in Papua New Guinea (52.4%) and in New Zealand (38.2%).

== Impacts and concerns ==
There are a range of views in the Australian community on the composition and level of immigration, and on the possible effects of varying the level of immigration and population growth.

In 2002, a CSIRO population study commissioned by the former Department of Immigration and Multicultural Affairs, outlined six potential dilemmas associated with immigration-driven population growth. These included: the absolute numbers of aged residents continuing to rise despite high immigration off-setting ageing and declining birth-rates in a proportional sense; a worsening of Australia's trade balance due to more imports and higher consumption of domestic production; increased greenhouse gas emissions; overuse of agricultural soils; marine fisheries and domestic supplies of oil and gas; and a decline in urban air quality, river quality and biodiversity.

=== Environment ===
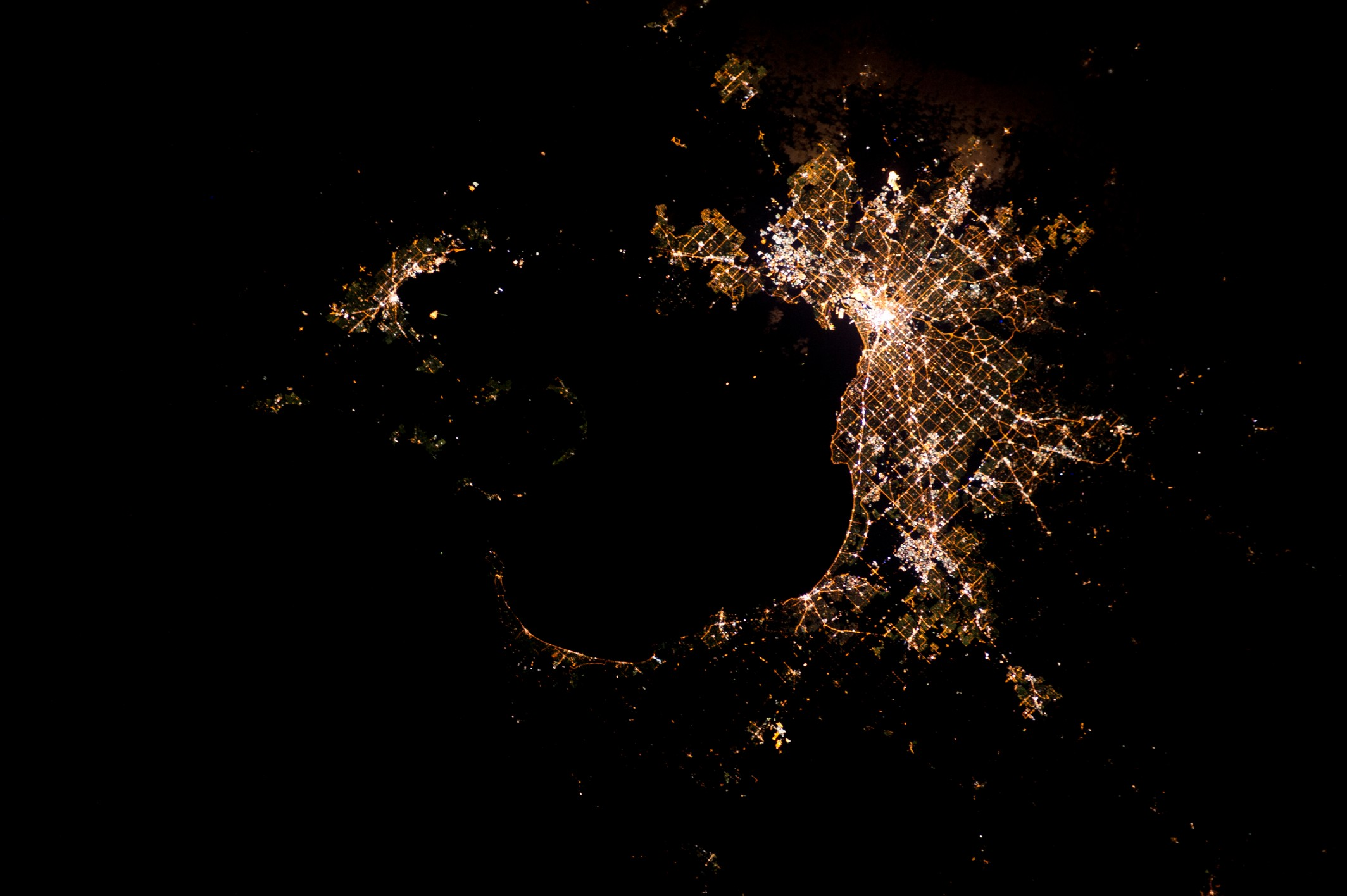
Melbourne at night from the International Space Station, showing its urban sprawl

Some environmental movements believe that as the driest inhabited continent, Australia cannot continue to sustain its current rate of population growth without becoming overpopulated. The Sustainable Population Australia (SPA) argues that climate change will lead to a deterioration of natural ecosystems through increased temperatures, extreme weather events and less rainfall in the southern part of the continent, thus reducing its capacity to sustain a large population even further. The Australia Institute has concluded that Australia's population growth has been one of the main factors driving growth in domestic greenhouse gas emissions. It concluded that the average emissions per capita in the countries that immigrants come from is only 42 percent of average emissions in Australia, finding that as immigrants alter their lifestyle to that of Australians, they increase global greenhouse gas emissions. The Institute calculated that each additional 70,000 immigrants will lead to additional emissions of 20 million tonnes of greenhouse gases by the end of the Kyoto target period (2012) and 30 million tonnes by 2020.

=== Housing and infrastructure ===
A number of economists, such as Macquarie Bank analyst Rory Robertson, assert that high immigration and the propensity of new arrivals to cluster in the capital cities is exacerbating the nation's housing affordability problem. According to Robertson, Federal Government policies that fuel demand for housing, such as the currently high levels of immigration, as well as capital gains tax discounts and subsidies to boost fertility, have had a greater impact on housing affordability than land release on urban fringes.

The Productivity Commission in its 2004 Inquiry Report No. 28, First Home Ownership, concluded: "Growth in immigration since the mid-1990s has been an important contributor to underlying demand, particularly in Sydney and Melbourne." The Reserve Bank of Australia in its submission to the same Productivity Commission report stated that "rapid growth in overseas visitors such as students may have boosted demand for rental housing". However, the Commission found that "the ABS resident population estimates have limitations when used for assessing housing demand. Given the significant influx of foreigners coming to work or study in Australia in recent years, it seems highly likely that short-stay visitor movements may have added to the demand for housing. However, the Commissions are unaware of any research that quantifies the effects."

Some individuals and interest groups have also argued that immigration causes overburdened infrastructure.

In 2024, Australia faced a housing crisis. The housing crisis could possibly be linked to Australia's level of migration According to some critics, the housing crisis in Australia was exacerbated by the immigration policies of the Albanese government.

=== Employment ===
Australia maintains a list of skilled occupations that are currently acceptable for immigration to Australia.

In 2009, following the 2008 financial crisis, the Australian government reduced its immigration target by 14%, and the permanent migration program for skilled migrants was reduced to 115,000 people for that financial year. In 2010–2011, the migration intake was adjusted so that 67.5% of the permanent migration program would be for skilled migrants, and 113,725 visas were granted.

According to Graduate Careers Australia, there have been some declines in full-time employment between 2012–2015 for recent university graduates of various degrees, including dentistry, computer science, architecture, psychology, and nursing. In 2014, a number of the professional associations for some of these fields criticised the immigration policy for skilled migrants, contending that these policies have contributed to difficulties for local degree holders in obtaining full-time employment. In 2016, the Department of Health forecast a shortfall in nurses of approximately 85,000 by 2025 and 123,000 by 2030.

In 2016, Monash University academics published a report which contended that Australia's immigration program is deeply flawed. The government's Medium to Long-Term Strategic Skill List allows immigration by professionals who end up competing with graduates of Australian universities for scarce positions. On the other hand, Australia's shortage of skilled tradespeople is not being addressed.

=== Economic growth and aging population ===
Another element in the immigration debate is a concern to alleviate adverse impacts arising from Australia's ageing population. In the 1990s, the former Federal Treasurer Peter Costello stated that Australia is underpopulated due to a low birth rate, and that negative population growth will have adverse long-term effects on the economy as the population ages and the labour market becomes less competitive. To avoid this outcome the government increased immigration to fill gaps in labour markets and introduced a subsidy to encourage families to have more children. However, opponents of population growth such as Sustainable Population Australia do not accept that population growth will decline and reverse, based on current immigration and fertility projections.

There is debate over whether immigration can slow the ageing of Australia's population. In a research paper entitled Population Futures for Australia: the Policy Alternatives, Peter McDonald claims that "it is demographic nonsense to believe that immigration can help to keep our population young." However, according to Creedy and Alvarado (p. 99), by 2031 there will be a 1.1 per cent fall in the proportion of the population aged over 65 if net migration rate is 80,000 per year. If net migration rate is 170,000 per year, the proportion of the population aged over 65 would reduce by 3.1 per cent. As of 2007 during the leadership of John Howard, the net migration rate was 160,000 per year.

According to the Commonwealth Treasury, immigration can reduce the average age of the Australian population: "The level of net overseas migration is important: net inflows of migrants to Australia reduce the rate of population ageing because migrants are younger on average than the resident population. Currently, around 85 per cent of migrants are aged under 40 when they migrate to Australia, compared to around 55 per cent for the resident population." Ross Gittins, an economics columnist at Fairfax Media, has said that the Government's focus on skilled migration has in fact reduced the average age of migrants. "More than half are aged 15 to 34, compared with 28 per cent of our population. Only 2 per cent of permanent immigrants are 65 or older, compared with 13 per cent of our population." Because of these statistics, Gittens claims that immigration is slowing the ageing of the Australian population and that the "net benefit to the economy is a lot more clear-cut."

Robert Birrell, director of the Centre for Population and Urban Research at Monash University, has argued: "It is true that a net migration intake averaging around 180,000 per year will mean that the proportion of persons aged 65 plus to the total population will be a few percentage points lower in 2050 than it would be with a low migration intake. But this ‘gain’ would be bought at the expense of having to accommodate a much larger population. These people too, will age, thus requiring an even larger migration intake in subsequent years to look after them."

In July 2005 the Productivity Commission launched a commissioned study entitled Economic Impacts of Migration and Population Growth, and released an initial position paper on 17 January 2006 which states that the increase of income per capita provided by higher migration (50 percent more than the base model) by the 2024–2025 financial year would be $335 (0.6%), an amount described as "very small." The paper also found that Australians would on average work 1.3 percent longer hours, about twice the proportional increase in income.

Using regression analysis, Addison and Worswick found in a 2002 study that "there is no evidence that immigration has negatively impacted on the wages of young or low-skilled natives." Furthermore, Addison's study found that immigration did not increase unemployment among native workers. Rather, immigration decreased unemployment. However, in 2005 the Productivity Commission concluded that higher immigration levels would result in lower wage growth for existing Australian residents. On the impact of immigration on unemployment levels, the Commission said: "The conclusion that immigration has not caused unemployment at an aggregate level does not imply that it cannot lead to higher unemployment for specific groups. Immigration could worsen the labour market outcomes of people who work in sectors of the economy that have high concentrations of immigrant workers."

Gittins claims there is considerable opposition to immigration in Australia by "battlers" because of the belief that immigrants will steal jobs. Gittins claims though that "it's true that immigrants add to the supply of labour. But it's equally true that, by consuming and bringing families who consume, they also add to the demand for labour – usually by more." Overall, Gittins has written that the "economic case for rapid population growth though immigration is surprisingly weak," noting the diseconomies of scale, infrastructure costs and negative environmental impacts associated with continued immigration-driven population growth.

Robert Birrell has asserted that high immigration levels are being used by the Federal Government to stimulate aggregate economic growth, but that per capita growth is more important to Australians. Birrell concluded that high migration does not benefit existing residents, because it dilutes the benefit that can accrue from the export of non-renewable resources which form a large part of the Australian economy. As well, Birrell argues that a slowdown in labour force growth would require employers to pay greater attention to training, wages and conditions of workers.

=== Social cohesion ===
The impact that immigration has on social cohesion in Australia is not clear. According to a 2018 report by the Scanlon Report, between 80 and 82% of Australians felt that immigration had a positive impact on Australian society. Australians under the age of 30 were twice as likely to feel positively about immigration as Australians over the age of 60 were. A follow-up report in 2019 found that 85% of Australians polled felt that multiculturalism had made a positive impact on Australia, but 40% admitted negative or very negative feelings towards Muslims.

== Politics and public debate ==
Over the last decade, leaders of the major Federal political parties have demonstrated support for high level immigration (including John Howard, Peter Costello and Kim Beazley). There was, overall, an upward trend in the number of immigrants to Australia over the period of the Howard Government (1996–2007). The Rudd Labor Government (elected 2007) increased the quota again once in office. In 2010, both major parties continued to support high immigration, with former Prime Minister Kevin Rudd advocating a 'Big Australia'; and Opposition Leader Tony Abbott stating in a 2010 Australia Day speech that: "My instinct is to extend to as many people as possible the freedom and benefits of life in Australia". On 7 August 2018, the Australian Bureau of Statistics population clock reached 25 million 33 years ahead of predictions, with 62% of the growth in the last ten years being a result of immigration.

In 2003, economist Ross Gittins, a columnist at Fairfax Media, said former Prime Minister John Howard had been "a tricky chap" on immigration, by appearing "tough" on illegal immigration to win support from the working class, while simultaneously winning support from employers with high legal immigration. In 2006, the Labor Party under Kim Beazley took a stance against the importation of increasingly large numbers of temporary skilled migrant workers by employers, arguing that this is simply a way for employers to drive down wages.

Senator Pauline Hanson has called for a national plebiscite asking voters if they think immigration is too high. The Australian Senate voted the proposal down 54 votes to 2.

In the 2025 Australian federal election campaign, housing affordability and its link to immigration were central points of contention between the Coalition leader Peter Dutton and Prime Minister Anthony Albanese. In 2025, the Coalition has pledged to reduce the annual permanent migration intake from the current level of 180,000 to 140,000.

One of the perpetrators in the 2025 Bondi Beach shooting, Sajid Akram, was a 50-year-old Indian national and permanent resident of Australia who had immigrated on a student visa in 1998. The attack has prompted discussions regarding Australia's immigration framework and gun laws. Then-Coalition leader Sussan Ley officially delayed the release of the opposition's new migration policy until 2026, citing the need to protect social cohesion following the terrorist attack.

In September 2026, immigration minister Tony Burke announced a new immigration policy, it dictates that the net overseas migration figure will come down from 292,000 to 245,000 and then 225,000 in 2027–28. The government would introduce stricter enforcement to deport those who have overstayed their visa by bringing in 100 new compliance officers and repurposing a former quarantine facility in Melbourne. Applicants for immigration with in-demand skills will be prioritised.

=== Polling ===
In 2019, a Lowy Institute poll found that 49% of Australians say that 'the total number of migrants coming to Australia each year is too high', while a minority said it is 'too low' (13%), representing a 10-point rise in opposition to immigration since 2014. Despite this, Australia's foreign born population has continued to rise.

A December 2023 survey conducted by the Australian Institute of Population Research at Monash University found that 74% of questioned voters preferred lower net migration from abroad. In 2024, the Scanlon Foundation's annual survey found that 49% of respondents said migration was too high. In 2025, data from the ABC Vote Compass showed that 49% of approximately 340,000 respondents wanted fewer immigrants coming to Australia, while 16% wanted more.

Surveys from 2018 and 2023 have found that over 15% polled have shown support for discrimination when it comes to immigration intake. Support for discrimination was higher on the basis of religion than on race or ethnicity.

== See also ==
- Aussie (poster) – Australian poster series by Peter Drew
- Opposition to immigration
- Remigration – Forced or promoted return of non-European immigrants
- Asylum in Australia
- Demography of Australia
- Foreign-born population of Australia
- Department of Home Affairs (Australia)
- Europeans in Oceania
- Immigrant benefits urban legend, a hoax regarding benefits comparison
- Immigrant health in Australia
- Immigration to New Zealand
- Mental health and immigration detention
- Multiculturalism in Australia
- Post war immigration to Australia
- Visa policy of Australia
- Far-right politics in Australia
