= Sustainable Population Australia =

Australian special advocacy group

Sustainable Population Australia (SPA) (formerly Australians for an Ecologically Sustainable Population) is an Australian special advocacy group, founded in Canberra in 1988, that seeks to establish an ecologically sustainable human population. SPA claims that it is an "ecological group dedicated to preserving species' habitats globally and in Australia from the degradation caused by human population growth", and that it "works on many fronts to encourage informed public debate about how Australia and the world can achieve an ecologically sustainable population".

SPA argues that population growth exacerbates Australia's water shortage and adds to greenhouse gas emissions.

SPA also seeks to highlight what it claims are the negative economic effects of population growth, such as increased housing costs, lower wages and living standards, and opposes the current historically high level of immigration to Australia. Immigration to Australia has averaged around 200,000 per annum over the past decade. It is the highest rate of immigration in the world.

SPA also opposes plans by the government to increase population growth with the baby bonus, a payout that encourages parents to have more children. SPA believes that the baby bonus, and the many other government "breeding incentives", should only be paid for the first child, halved for the second, and not paid at all for any more births than that.

== See also ==
- Sustainable Australia
- Stop Population Growth Now
- Big Australia
