= AMEP =

AMEP may refer to:

- Adult Migrant English Program
- AMEP Parekklisia, football club
- Aston Martin Engine Plant
- Australian Motoring Enthusiast Party
- Party of the Hungarian Interest (Hungarian: A Magyar Érdek Pártja)
- America Party
