= Ingrid Piller =

Australian linguist (born 1967)

- Born: 1967 (age 58–59)
- Known for: Linguistic diversity and social participation
- Scientific career
- Fields: Applied Linguistics; Intercultural communication Sociolinguistics
- Workplaces: Macquarie University
- Website: www.languageonthemove.org

Ingrid Piller FAHA (born in Germany in 1967) is an Australian linguist, who specializes in intercultural communication, language learning, multilingualism, and bilingual education. Piller is Distinguished Professor at Macquarie University and an elected fellow of the Australian Academy of the Humanities. Piller serves as Editor-in-Chief of the academic journal Multilingua and as founding editor of the research dissemination site Language on the Move. She is a member of the Australian Research Council (ARC) College of Experts.

== Career ==
Piller received her PhD from the Technical University Dresden in 1995 for a thesis about American Automobile Names. In 2007, Piller was appointed executive director of the Adult Migrant English Program Research Center at Macquarie University. She is a member of the executive group of the international research network "Social participation across generations in linguistically diverse societies – risks and chances in times of crises".

== Research and impact ==
Piller works in Applied Linguistics and Sociolinguistics with a focus on Intercultural Communication, Language Learning, Multilingualism, and Bilingual Education. Her research examines the social consequences of linguistic diversity resulting from migration and globalization for employment, education, and other aspects of social participation.

According to Google Scholar, her work has been cited more than 7,100 times.

== Honors and awards ==
- Elected fellow of the Australian Academy of the Humanities in 2017
- Recipient of 2018 Anneliese Maier Research Award by the Alexander von Humboldt Foundation for her research into the social consequences of linguistic diversity
- Appointed Distinguished Professor at Macquarie University in 2019 in recognition of her contributions to Applied Linguistics and Sociolinguistics
- Winner of the 2017 Book Prize of the British Association for Applied Linguistics (BAAL) for her book Linguistic Diversity and Social Justice (Oxford University Press, 2016)
- Winner of the 2017 Prose Award in the category "Language and Linguistics" for her book Linguistic Diversity and Social Justice (Oxford University Press, 2016)
- Recipient of the Australian Linguistic Society's 2012 Talkley Award for contributions to public knowledge about language

== Selected publications ==
=== Books ===
- Piller, I. (2002). Bilingual Couples Talk: The discursive construction of hybridity. Amsterdam: Benjamins.
- Piller, I. (2016). Linguistic diversity and social justice. Oxford and New York: Oxford University Press. Persian translation, 2019.
- Piller, I. (2017). Intercultural Communication: A Critical Introduction (2nd ed.). Edinburgh: Edinburgh University Press. Japanese translation of 1st edition, 2014.

=== Book chapters ===
- Pavlenko, A., & Piller, I. (2001). New Directions in the Study of Multilingualism, Second Language Learning, and Gender. In A. Pavlenko, A. Blackledge, I. Piller, & M. Teutsch-Dwyer (Eds.), Multilingualism, Second Language Learning and Gender (pp. 17–52). Berlin and New York: Mouton de Gruyter.
- Piller, I. (2008). 'I always wanted to marry a cowboy:' bilingual couples, language and desire. In T. A. Karis & K. D. Killian (Eds.), Intercultural Couples: Exploring Diversity in Intimate Relationships (pp. 53–70). London: Routledge.
- Piller, I. (2010). Sex in the city: on making space and identity in travel spaces. In A. Jaworski & C. Thurlow (Eds.), Semiotic Landscapes: Language, Image, Space (pp. 123–136). London: Continuum.
- Piller, I. (2018). Dubai: Language in the ethnocratic, corporate and mobile city. In D. Smakman & P. Heinrich (Eds.), Urban Sociolinguistics: the city as a linguistic process and experience (pp. 77–94). London: Routledge.
- Piller, I., & Takahashi, K. (2006). A passion for English: desire and the language market. In A. Pavlenko (Ed.), Bilingual minds: Emotional experience, expression, and representation (pp. 59–83). Clevedon: Multilingual Matters.
- Piller, I., & Takahashi, K. (2013). Language work aboard the low-cost airline. In A. Duchêne, M. Moyer, & C. Roberts (Eds.), Language, Migration and Social Inequalities: A Critical Sociolinguistic Perspective on Institutions and Work (pp. 95–117). Clevedon: Multilingual Matters.

=== Journal articles ===
- Piller, I. (2002). Passing for a native speaker: identity and success in second language learning. Journal of Sociolinguistics, 6(2), pp. 179–206.
- Piller, I. (2016). Monolingual ways of seeing multilingualism. Journal of Multicultural Discourses, 11(1), pp. 25–33.
- Piller, I., & Cho, J. (2013). Neoliberalism as language policy. Language in Society, 42(1), pp. 23–44.
- Piller, I., & Gerber, L. (2021). Family language policy between the bilingual advantage and the monolingual mindset. International Journal of Bilingual Education and Bilingualism, 24(5), pp. 622–635.
- Piller, I., & Lising, L. (2014). Language, employment and settlement: temporary meat workers in Australia. Multilingua, 33(1/2), pp. 35–59.
- Piller, I., Zhang, J., & Li, J. (2020). Linguistic diversity in a time of crisis. Multilingua, 39(5), pp. 503–515.
