= Multilingua =

Academic journal in linguistics

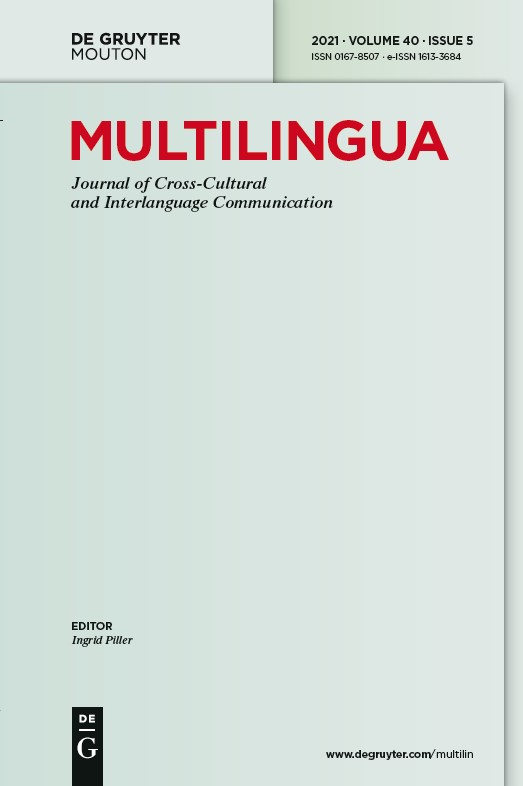
- Discipline: Language learning, linguistics, multilingualism
- Language: English
- Edited by: Ingrid Piller

Publication details
- History: 1982–present
- Publisher: de Gruyter Mouton
- Frequency: Bimonthly
- Impact factor: 1.339 (2020)

Standard abbreviations
- ISO 4: Multilingua

Indexing
- ISSN: 0167-8507 (print); 1613-3684 (web)
- LCCN: 2011233809
- OCLC no.: 785798699

Links
- Journal homepage; Online access; Online archive

Multilingua, Journal of Cross-Cultural and Interlanguage Communication is a bimonthly peer-reviewed academic journal in linguistics, specializing in the sociolinguistics of multilingualism, language learning, intercultural communication, and translation and interpreting. The journal was established in 1982 and is published by de Gruyter Mouton.

== Publication history ==
The journal was established in 1982 with the support of the Commission of the European Communities to "provide an interface between the Institutions and the members of the public who are interested in multilingualism, be they teachers, translators or interpreters, computer experts, publishers or librarians, businessmen or politicians."

The founding editor-in-chief was Juan Carlos Sager, who edited the journal until 1987. He was succeeded by Richard J. Watts who served in that position until 2013. His successor is Ingrid Piller.

== Abstracting and indexing ==
The journal is abstracted and indexed in:

- Arts and Humanities Citation Index
- EBSCO databases
- FRANCIS
- Index Islamicus
- International Bibliography of Periodical Literature
- International Bibliography of the Social Sciences
- Linguistic Bibliography
- Modern Language Association Database
- ProQuest databases
- Social Sciences Citation Index
- Scopus

According to the Journal Citation Reports, the journal has a 2020 impact factor of 1.339.
