= Carol Schwartz (businesswoman) =

Australian business executive and philanthropist

Carol Schwartz AO
- Born: Carol Judith Besen; 1955 (age 70–71); Melbourne, Victoria, Australia
- Education: Steiner School, Elwood; Mount Scopus Memorial College
- Alma mater: Monash University
- Board member of: Reserve Bank of Australia
- Parents: Marc Besen (father); Eva Besen (mother)
- Relatives: Naomi Milgrom (sister); John Gandel (uncle)

Carol Judith Schwartz AO (née Besen; born 1955) is an Australian business executive, community leader and philanthropist.

== Early life and education ==
Born Carol Judith Besen in Melbourne in 1955, Schwartz is the daughter of Eva and Marc Besen, of the fashion retailer Sussan. She was educated at a Jewish Steiner school in Elwood and then completed her secondary education at Mount Scopus Memorial College. She graduated from Monash University with an arts/law degree.

== Career ==
Schwartz began work in the property division of the family business, developing shopping centres in Melbourne and Sydney. She understood the importance of seeking involvement by the community during the planning stages of shopping centres but also during their lifetime.

She was appointed a board member of the Property Council of Victoria in 1993 and was elected president the following year. The first woman in the role, Schwartz made it easier for women to participate by, for example, moving lunch meetings from male-only venues.

Schwartz is a director of the Trawalla Group and chair of the Trawalla Foundation. She is chair of Our Community, a not-for-profit organisation that assists community groups to win grants.

Schwartz began a ten-year term on the board of the Reserve Bank of Australia in 2017.

== Awards and recognition ==
Schwartz was awarded the Centenary Medal in 2001. She was appointed as a Member of the Order of Australia in the 2006 Australia Day Honours and was promoted to Officer in the 2019 Queen's Birthday Honours for "distinguished service to the community as a supporter of women in leadership roles, to social justice advocacy, and to business".

Schwartz was inducted into the Victorian Honour Roll of Women in 2011. After receiving a Monash University Fellowship in 2010, she was presented with an honorary doctorate by her alma mater, Monash University, in May 2018. In November 2020 Schwartz received the Leading Philanthropist award in recognition of her support for the University of Melbourne's Pathways to Politics Program for Women.
