= Partners in Aid =

Partners in Aid is an aid organisation supporting projects in India, Bangladesh, and the Philippines.

== History ==
Partners In Aid was established in 1962 with the intention of providing support to rural communities in India and Bangladesh. Initially, the organisation had two paid staff. However, it now operates on a volunteer basis.

Early projects involved shipments of livestock, but during the 1980s, Partners In Aid policies expanded to include community health and economic development. Current activities are facilitated through partnerships with locally registered, in-country NGOs.

When Austcare changed its name to ActionAid Australia after joining ActionAid International as an affiliate, the organisation previously known as "Action Aid Australia – For Those Who Have Less" changed its name to Partners in Aid.

== Current board members and advisors ==
The board of Partners in Aid meets regularly to discuss projects and fund raising activities. Board members include Councillor Amanda Stone and Dr. Graham Moore. Advisors include Joy Handley, who has written about Bangladesh and provides support with Partners in Aid's work with the All Bengal Women's Union, and Dr. Cecily Neil, a sociologist who has written extensively about the development sector. The Rev Dr. Morris Lee of Symbiosis International is also an advisor., as is Dr. Roger Hughes.

== Current work ==
Partners in Aid is an international development agency based in Narre Warren, Australia. The organisation finances small-scale community development projects in Bangladesh, the Philippines, and India, as well as running child sponsorship programmes in India. They are a current signatory to the ACFID code of conduct. Partners in Aid is also involved in groups such as Our Community, which aims at capacity building Australian community groups.

=== Projects in India ===
According to the website, Partners in Aid works with two NGOs in India – SEDS (Social Education and Development Society) based in Andhra Pradesh, and the All Bengal Women's Union, in Kolkata.

Partners in Aid assists with watershed management and child sponsorship projects at SEDS. SEDS was established with the aim of helping people living in the drought-prone area of Anantapur District in Andhra Pradesh.

Also in India, Partners in Aid assists with the work of the All Bengal Women's Union. Originally established in 1932 by a group of local women to assist exploited women and children in Calcutta, the All Bengal Women's Union now has a variety of projects, ranging from an Old Age Women's home, to vocational training, a primary school, a children's welfare home and provision of counselling for children who live in the home.

=== Projects in Bangladesh ===
In Bangladesh, Partners in Aid works with an NGO known as Symbiosis. They support two Symbiosis projects – the Jamuna River Development Project (JRDP), and the Training and Information Support Program (known as TTIS). Symbiosis aim to promote human development in harmony with the environment.

Most years, the Jamuna River overflows. When the resulting flood water recedes, sandbanks appear. People move to the sandbanks in order to farm the "new land". The project aims to assist these people and has three components – education, micro-credit and health.

The TTIS project aims to enable poor and marginalized men and women learn skills that could give them access to job markets that they would not otherwise have been able to work in. The sewing project of TTIS alone has equipped more than 2,000 women with sewing skills over the last decade.

=== Project in the Philippines ===
In the Philippines, Partners in Aid supports the Sinangpad Healthy Village Project. The project's aims include providing information for local communities to improve village sanitation. The project is located in Kalinga province and was taken on by Partners in Aid as it was started by a former member of the Board.
