= Skilled Occupation List (Australia) =

Aspect of Australian migration law

The Skilled Occupation List is a list of occupations that are currently acceptable for immigration to Australia. Occupations are divided into separate categories such as professionals, managers, traders etc.

A person selecting an occupation from the list must have his or her qualification assessed by an authorised agency before becoming eligible to use the occupation points.

The Department of Education, Skills, and Employment regularly updates the SOL to reflect changes in the Australian labour market and current demand for occupations in the country.

Australia has many different kinds of visas that can be applied for by skilled foreign workers who, along with meeting all the other requirements, are qualified for either working or training in an eligible skilled occupation in Australia.

The Skilled Occupation list will be taken into consideration for the purposes of different Australian work visas, such as – Skilled Independent visa [subclass 189] (points-tested stream), Training visa [subclass 407], Skilled Nominated visa [subclass 190], Employer Nomination Scheme [ENS] visa [subclass 186], Skilled Regional 491 visa [provisional] [subclass 489], Temporary Graduate visa [subclass 485] (graduate work), Skilled Employer Sponsored Regional [provisional] visa [subclass 494], Regional Sponsored Migration Scheme [RSMS] visa [subclass 187], Temporary Skill Shortage [TSS] visa [subclass 482], and Skilled Work regional [provisional] visa [subclass 491].
