= Our Community =

Our Community is an Australian social entrepreneurship body set up to build capacity in Australia's 600,000 community groups and grantmaking bodies.

The Our Community Group comprises a number of different enterprises.

In 2009, Our Community launched a cloud-based grants management administration software tool that is used by local, state and federal government, philanthropic and corporate grantmakers to receive applications and manage their funding programs.

The company was founded in 2000 by Denis Moriarty, its current managing director, who received a Centenary Medal in recognition for establishing Our Community. It is chaired by prominent social investor and Reserve Bank of Australia member Carol Schwartz AO. In the past, it had Rhonda Galbally AO as its CEO.

In 2007, Our Community was named the winner of the "Cool Company" Social Capitalist Award, where the organisation was described as a "deeply noble enterprise."

There are over 55,000 community and not-for-profit groups involved with Our Community ranging from large organisations such as Oxfam Australia, to small ones such as Partners in Aid.
