= Fairwear Australia =

Fairwear Australia (or The Fair Wear Campaign) is a community campaign which addresses exploitation of home-based textile and clothing workers in Australia. Made up of churches, non-governmental organisations, schools and community members, FairWear has worked since 1996 to achieve wage justice and fair working conditions for outworkers in Australia. This work includes education, lobbying government, activism and community work. In 2005 FairWear launched an international campaign to encourage companies to have transparent and ethical international supply chains which insure a living wage and fair conditions for textile workers globally.
