= Big Australia =

Concept of the future population of Australia

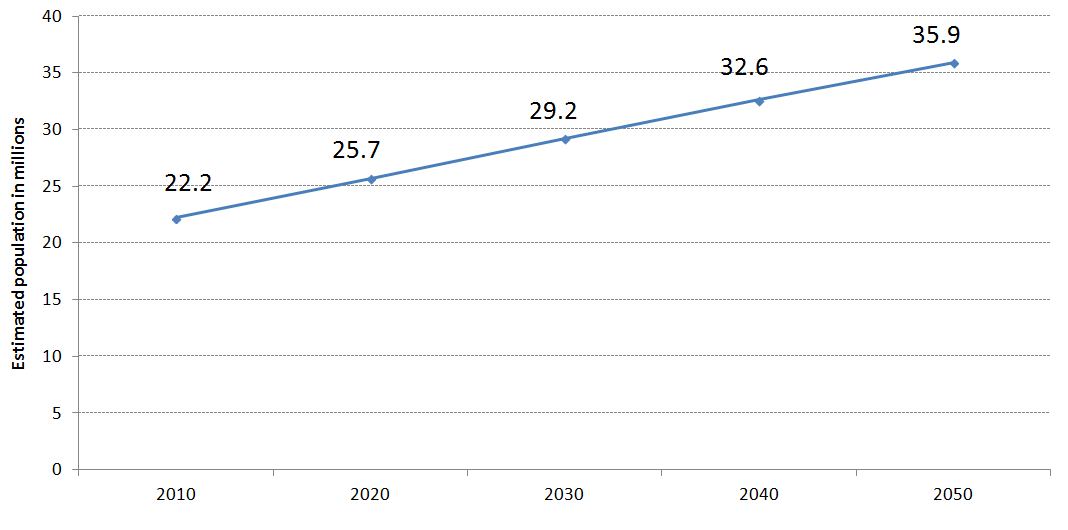
A graph of the population projections contained on page 117 of the 2010 Intergenerational Report, which led to the "big Australia" debate

Big Australia was a term used by former Australian Prime Minister Kevin Rudd to describe an increase in the population of Australia from 22 million in 2010 to 36 million in 2050, along with the policies needed to react to it.

As of 2026, Australia's population was at 28 million.

== History ==
In 2009, Rudd stated that he was in favour of a "big Australia" in response to a demographic projection in the Government's Intergenerational Report, which showed that the population of Australia would increase from 22 million in 2010 to 35 million in 2050. A portion of the growth involved continued high rates of immigration to Australia, which proved controversial. In April 2010, Rudd appointed Tony Burke to the position of Minister for Population and asked him to develop a population policy.

Julia Gillard, who ousted Rudd from office in June 2010, stated shortly after taking over that she did not support Rudd's position. In her opinion, a "big Australia" would be unsustainable. Gillard's position was "a sustainable Australia, not a big Australia". The Government released a "sustainable population strategy" in May 2011, which did not specify a target population. In October 2011 trade minister Craig Emerson released a paper with Gillard's approval that advocated for continued rapid rates of population growth.

Demographic projections released by the Queensland Centre for Population Research in 2011 found that there is a 50 per cent likelihood of Australia's population being larger than 35 million by 2050. Similarly, the latest ABS projections (3222.0) have a midpoint projection of 37.1 million for 2050. These projections always assume net migration of at least 175,000, a figure unknown to Australia before 2006, when John Howard achieved 182,000.

Since the 2010s "big Australia" has sometimes been opted for disparagement as a dog whistle in racial ideologies.

In 2018 as Minister for Cities, Urban Infrastructure and Population, Alan Tudge stated his support for a "Bigger Australia".

Following the COVID-19 pandemic, "big Australia" made appearances as migration began to rebound from the re-opening of international borders. The debate surrounded a skills shortage, the housing crisis and a growing awareness among Australian people for the benefits of immigration. Despite the reduced population growth in 2020–21, housing prices continued to rise, with rises linked towards housing policies which suppress the number of homes which can be built, Australia's low population density, as well as changing household demographics. Instead, immigration can be used to complement policy tools and urban design while reducing strain on infrastructure.

The cost of living crisis led to the Federal Government to signal changes to the immigration system in December 2023, with the Opposition arguing immigration leading to a "big Australia" was responsible for housing pressures. Migrants are a part of the housing construction sector, though the Government also wants to invest in domestic skills. New South Wales became the first state in Australia to respond to the housing crisis with supply-side policy levers by "upzoning" the number of homes allowed to meet demand where it is highest, accompanied by significant investment in infrastructure, a move similar to New Zealand which resulted in increased rental stock and affordability.
