= Intestine cancer =

Intestine cancer may refer to:

- Colorectal cancer
- Small intestine cancer

== See also ==
- Gastrointestinal cancer
