= Baby bonus =

Form of social benefit

A baby bonus is a government payment to parents of a newborn baby or adopted child to assist with the costs of childrearing.

== Argentina ==
A baby bonus was introduced in 1996 for both born (and not yet born) and adopted children. It is means tested and varies by geographic location.

== Australia ==
The government of Andrew Fisher introduced a baby bonus of £5 per child in late 1912. The bonus was available irrespective of marital status and could also be received by husbands of women who died in childbirth. While Fisher told parliament that the aim was to help mothers in their time of need, the intention was also to increase birth and infant survival rates in the country.

The baby bonus scheme reintroduced by the Federal Government of Australia in the 2002 budget was aimed at offsetting the expenses associated with bearing a child. The scheme was also introduced as a means of increasing Australia's fertility rate and to mitigate the effects of Australia's ageing population. In the 2004 budget, the bonus was raised from $3,000 effective 1 July 2004 to $4,000 payable in 2007 but indexed to inflation so that in October 2007, the amount receivable per eligible child was $4,133. The bonus was paid in a lump sum to a nominated financial institution. From 1 January 2009, the payment is paid in 13 fortnightly installments. The receivable amount in January 2012 was $5,437. The receivable amount in September 2012 is $5,000 in 13 fortnightly instalments (parents will receive a higher first instalment of $846.20 and 12 fortnightly instalments of $346.15), or if the baby died or was a stillborn, parents may ask for their Baby Bonus to be paid in a lump sum instead of fortnightly instalments.

In the draft of the 2013 federal budget, the "baby bonus" would be slashed from $5,000.00 to $2056.45 as of 1 March 2014. The first newborn child will receive $2056.45, and for every subsequent child thereafter, a limited $1028.15 will be submitted. There have been other changes recently.

There are additional benefits for Aboriginal people.

== Canada ==
A baby bonus was introduced in Canada following World War II, paying $5 to $8 monthly to all parents of children under 16.

In 1988, the Quebec government introduced the Allowance for Newborn Children that paid up to $8,000 to a family after the birth of a child.

In 2008, Newfoundland and Labrador introduced the Parental Benefits Program, which offered a $1,000 lump sum and $100 payments for the first year after a birth or adoption. It expired in 2016.

Today, the Canada Child Benefit is one of several benefits offered by the Government of Canada.

== Czech Republic ==
Currently there is a baby bonus of 13000 CZK (approx. 670 USD) for each first child born to mothers with low income. The mother must be a citizen or permanent resident of the Czech Republic.

== France ==
A bonus of €944.51 is paid for each child born (means-tested).

== Italy ==
Currently, there is a bonus of €960 (approx. $1,133) for every child born to household with income lower than €26,000 (approx. $30,700), and €1920 (approx. $2,266) for every child born to household with income lower than €7,000 (approx. $8,271).

== Lithuania ==
Currently, there is a bonus of €405 ($475) for every child in Lithuania.

== Luxembourg ==
Luxembourg's baby bonus system is split into three stages, known as allocation prénatale (prenatal allowance), allocation de naissance (birth allowance) and allocation postnatale (postnatal allowance). The allowance is universal and is not means-tested.

The total allowance amounts to €1,740.09, paid in three sums of €580.03 once each stage is complete.

The prenatal allowance can be claimed once a woman has undergone 5 obstetric examinations and 1 dental examination.

The birth allowance can be claimed once a woman has undergone a postnatal gynaecological examination. This way, a woman whose baby is stillborn or dies shortly after birth is still entitled to the first two parts of the baby bonus.

The postnatal allowance can be claimed once the child has turned 2 years old and has undergone 6 medical examinations with a paediatrician.

== Poland ==
In April 2016, the Law and Justice government, in response to low fertility rates in Poland, introduced the Family 500+ program. For every second child, parents receive 500PLN ($133) monthly until the child turns 18. For example, if a family has three children, they would receive 1000PLN every month until the oldest child turns 18, after which they would receive 500PLN.

In July 2019, the Family 500+ program was extended to include 500PLN for the first child, regardless of family's economic status.

== Russia ==
As of 2025, Russia offers 690,000 RUB (USD 8295,28) for first child and additional 221,895 (USD 2667,65) rub for the second child. Amount is indexed annually with inflation. This can only be spent on housing, education, healthcare, or a mother's pension.

== Singapore ==
The Baby Bonus Scheme (formerly known as Child Development Co-Savings Scheme) was first introduced in Singapore on 1 April 2001. The scheme is continuously enhanced since its inception till 2021. The objective is to improve the country's fertility rate by providing cash incentives, with the hope of reducing the financial burden of raising children and thereby encouraging them to have more children. The scheme consists of two components, Cash Gift, and Child Development Account (CDA); which has a monetary grant and a savings matching scheme.

As of 2022, here are the benefits given as part of the Baby Bonus scheme.

Singapore’s Marriage and Parenthood Package
Type of Incentives (for first & second child)	Benefits
Baby Bonus (Cash Gift)	S$8,000 for first two children, $10,000 for third and subsequent child
Baby Bonus (First Step Grant)	S$3,000 for all children
Baby Bonus (CDA co-savings)	S$3,000 for first child, $6,000 for second child, $9,000 for third and fourth child, $15,000 for fifth and subsequent child
Parenthood Tax Rebate (PTR)	S$5,000 for first child, $10,000 for second child, $20,000 for third and subsequent child
Maternity Leave per child (paid)	16 weeks of which 4 weeks can be shared by the father
Paternity Leave per child (paid)	2 weeks
Paid Child Care Leave per year per parent	6 days until both children turn 7 or 2 days when children ages 7–12.

=== Cash Gift ===
For Singapore Citizen children born on or after 1 January 2015, the maximum amount of cash gift from the government is S$10,000, which can be spent without any restriction. It is available to each children up to 18 months of age.

Cash Gift Schedule
birth Order	At Birth	6-month (Child's Age)	12-month (Child's Age)	15-month (Child's Age)	18-month (Child's Age)	Total
First and Second Child	S$3,000	S$1,500	S$1,500	S$1,000	S$1,000	S$8,000
Third and Subsequent Child	S$4,000	S$2,000	S$2,000	S$1,000	S$1,000	S$10,000

=== Child Development Account (CDA) ===
The Child Development Account (CDA) now has two components. Since 24 March 2016, a First Step Grant of up to $3,000 is credited by the Singapore government to each child once a CDA account is opened. The government contributes a dollar for a dollar matching the amount of savings that parents contribute to their child's savings in the CDA with the cap reduced as a result of the Grant. The amount is capped at S$6,000 for the first child, S$9,000 for the second child, S$12,000 for the third and fourth child, and S$18,000 for the fifth and subsequent child. The savings in this account may be used by the child and his/her siblings at the approved institutions for Child Care Centre, Early Intervention Programmes, Healthcare Institutions, Kindergarten, Special Education Centre, Assistive Technology Device Provider, Optical Shop and Pharmacy. With effect from 1 January 2013, the CDA of a child will remain open until the end of the child's 12th year, instead of the current 6th year.

Total Baby Bonus Benefits by Birth Order
birth Order	Cash Gift from Government	First Step Grant	Maximum Government Co-Matching	Total
First and Second	S$8,000	S$5,000	Up to S$3,000	Up to S$14,000
Second	S$8,000	S$5,000	Up to S$6,000	Up to S$17,000
Third and Fourth	S$10,000	S$5,000	Up to S$9,000	Up to S$22,000
Fifth and beyond	S$10,000	S$5,000	Up to S$15,000	Up to S$28,000

=== Parenthood Tax Rebate (PTR) ===
Parents are given Parenthood Tax Rebate to be used to offset against income tax payable and it can be shared among the parents. The rebate amount is $5,000 for the first child, $10,000 for the second child, and $20,000 per child for all subsequent children. Unutilized balance is automatically carried forward to offset future income tax payable.

== See also ==
- Parental leave
- Child benefit
- Cost of raising a child
- Sub-replacement fertility
- Tax on childlessness
- Natalism
- Decreţei
