= Adult Migrant English Program =

The Adult Migrant English Program (AMEP) is a free English tuition service funded by the Australian federal government to assist eligible migrants and humanitarian entrants with low English levels to improve their English language skills and increase their participation socially and economically in the Australian community.

The AMEP was established in 1948 and assists around 50,000 to 60,000 eligible migrants and humanitarian entrants each year. The program is available to permanent visa holders, some temporary visa holders and Australian citizens who previously held a permanent visa aged 18 years and over. People aged 15–17 years old can also participate in AMEP in some circumstances.

The AMEP is delivered at approximately 300 locations across Australia in major cities, as well as regional and remote areas. A range of flexible English learning options are offered, including face-to-face and online classes, a volunteer tutor scheme and distance learning. Free childcare is available for families with under school-aged children while they are participating in classes.

Substantial reforms were implemented for the AMEP, effective from April 19, 2021, enabling more migrants to remain in the program for an extended duration and continue until they achieve a higher level of proficiency.
