= Foreign-born population of Australia =

Country of birth of Australian residents (2021)

In 2025, 32% of the Australian resident population, or 8,576,680 people, were born overseas, up from 29.1% in 2020.

== International comparison ==
Australia has one of the highest numbers of foreign-born residents in the world (both in total numbers, and per capita), as well as one of the highest immigration rates in the world.

Immigrants account for 30% of the population, the highest proportion among major Western nations.

In 2015, Australia had the 8th highest foreign-born population in the world, behind Canada but ahead of France (both countries had very close numbers to Australia). The United States was ranked 1st, with over 46 million foreign-born residents. The over 8.6 million immigrants in Australia constituted 3.1% of all immigrants in the world.

For foreign-born residents per capita, Australia was ranked the 11th highest sovereign country ahead of Lebanon and behind Jordan (both countries experienced a large influx of refugees from the civil war in neighbouring Syria). Vatican City was 1st, its population of 800 were 100% foreign-born. If dependent territories (e.g.: Guam, Macau, Channel Islands) were included, then Australia's rank would fall to 27th.

From 2010 to 2015, Australia had the 14th highest net migration rate in the world. For 2015–2020, Australia's migration rate was projected to fall (statistics published in 2019), however the country's rank was expected to remain steady at 14th due to similar falls in other countries.

== Population by country of birth ==
Australian and foreign born population pyramid in 2021

The following table shows Australia's population by country of birth as estimated by the Australian Bureau of Statistics in 2025.

Source: Australian Bureau of Statistics (2025)
Place of birth	Estimated resident population
Australia	18,779,950
Total foreign-born	8,833,710
India	971,020
England (Note: The Australian Bureau of Statistics source lists England, Scotland, Wales and Northern Ireland separately although they are all part of the United Kingdom. These should not be combined as they are not combined in the source.)	970,950
China (Note: In accordance with the Australian Bureau of Statistics source, Mainland China, Taiwan and the Special Administrative Regions of Hong Kong and Macau are listed separately.)	731,540
New Zealand	637,680
Philippines	412,530
Vietnam	326,630
South Africa	229,950
Nepal	213,580
Sri Lanka	184,800
Malaysia	184,320
Italy	152,560
Pakistan	143,920
Indonesia	128,140
Hong Kong	128,040
Scotland	125,690
United States	122,030
South Korea	121,660
Thailand	115,250
Iraq	111,880
Ireland	105,620
Germany	101,400
Lebanon	98,390
Afghanistan	96,180
Iran	95,690
France	95,140
Greece	86,980
Bangladesh	84,880
Brazil	74,110
Fiji	72,110
Taiwan	70,650
Colombia	65,380
Netherlands	63,850
Canada	61,310
Japan	59,280
Zimbabwe	52,830
Singapore	49,620
Egypt	48,840
North Macedonia	48,680
Myanmar	48,450
Cambodia	47,290
Croatia	47,240
Poland	46,900
Turkey	46,650
Bhutan	40,560
Chile	40,140
Samoa	39,640
Syria	38,800
Papua New Guinea	38,560
Kenya	37,850
Malta	34,060
Russia	32,000
Wales	31,750
Mauritius	30,040
Argentina	29,990
Bosnia and Herzegovina	29,780
Serbia	28,830
Northern Ireland	26,670
Nigeria	22,020
Ukraine	21,450
Spain	21,300
Tonga	20,330
United Arab Emirates	19,990
Sudan	19,170
Ethiopia	18,510
Portugal	18,070
Saudi Arabia	17,240
Peru	17,060
Cyprus	16,560
Hungary	16,350
Romania	16,150
East Timor	14,950
Mongolia	14,880
Switzerland	13,620
Austria	13,560
Israel	12,870
Laos	12,610
Sweden	12,060
El Salvador	11,140
Czech Republic	10,650
Uruguay	10,280
Mexico	10,240
Ghana	10,010
Jordan	9,970
Somalia	9,890
Vanuatu	9,660
Kuwait	9,610
Denmark	9,250
Democratic Republic of the Congo	9,230
South Sudan	9,190
Zambia	9,120
Solomon Islands	8,810
Venezuela	8,620
Belgium	8,260
Cook Islands	8,030
Finland	7,970
Eritrea	7,200
Slovakia	6,770
Uganda	5,610
Ecuador	5,530
Slovenia	5,280
Tanzania	5,150
Sierra Leone	4,290
Norway	4,220
Albania	4,210
Estonia	4,210
Bulgaria	3,920
Liberia	3,760
Brunei	3,700
Burundi	3,670
Qatar	3,430
Macau	3,360
Latvia	3,280
Lithuania	3,250
Palestine	3,090
Kazakhstan	3,060
Morocco	3,020
Uzbekistan	2,900
Libya	2,800
Bahrain	2,670
Seychelles	2,640
Belarus	2,610
Republic of the Congo	2,590
Kiribati	2,450
Oman	2,450
Malawi	2,160
Botswana	2,040
Namibia	2,030
New Caledonia	1,960
Trinidad and Tobago	1,930
Kosovo	1,790
Algeria	1,780
Montenegro	1,690
Rwanda	1,640
Jersey	1,540
Moldova	1,540
Armenia	1,540
Yemen	1,490
Jamaica	1,360
Bolivia	1,310
Guinea	1,180
Mozambique	1,120
Cuba	1,050
Niue	1,020
Georgia	980
Nauru	950
Isle of Man	950
Guatemala	910
Nicaragua	890
Guernsey	870
Tunisia	860
Azerbaijan	850
Maldives	810
Kyrgyzstan	810
Cameroon	790
Paraguay	750
Costa Rica	710
Ivory Coast	700
Bermuda	630
Norfolk Island	610
Tokelau	610
Tuvalu	580
Guyana	580
Angola	570
French Polynesia	560
American Samoa	560
Honduras	550
Senegal	510
Gibraltar	450
Barbados	430
Iceland	410
Madagascar	400
Eswatini	380
Panama	370
Dominican Republic	360
Togo	360
Luxembourg	340
Bahamas	320
Central African Republic	290
Tajikistan	270
Puerto Rico	250
Réunion	240
Djibouti	210
Turkmenistan	200
Cayman Islands	200
Lesotho	190
Suriname	160
Haiti	160
Curaçao	160
Gambia	160
Grenada	150
Guam	140
Chad	140
Monaco	120
Benin	110
Belize	90
Falkland Islands	80
Aruba	80
Saint Lucia	80
Burkina Faso	80
Saint Vincent and the Grenadines	70
Gabon	70
Mali	70
Marshall Islands	60
Antigua and Barbuda	60
Martinique	60
Saint Kitts and Nevis	50
Cape Verde	50
Mauritania	50
French Guiana	40
Dominica	40
Guadeloupe	40
Niger	40
Saint Helena	40
Northern Mariana Islands	30
Palau	30
Faroe Islands	30
Greenland	30
Andorra	30
North Korea	30
United States Virgin Islands	30
Comoros	30
Micronesia	20
British Virgin Islands	20
Sint Maarten	20
Equatorial Guinea	20
Guinea-Bissau	20
São Tomé and Príncipe	20
Wallis and Futuna	10
Pitcairn Islands	10
Liechtenstein	10
Åland Islands	10
San Marino	10
Western Sahara	10
Montserrat	10
Mayotte	10

== Historical populations by country of birth ==
The following table shows Australia's population by country of birth during historical census years. The top 100 countries are shown.

Rank	Place of birth	Estimated resident population, 2001 census	Estimated resident population, 2006 census	Estimated resident population, 2011 census	Estimated resident population, 2016 census	Estimated resident population, 2021 census	% Change 2006-2021	Rank movement 2006-2021
1	Australia	13,629,685	14,072,946	15,017,846	15,614,834	17,019,815	▲20.9%	Steady
2	England	847,365	856,939	911,593	907,568	927,490	▲8.2%	Steady
3	India	95,452	147,106	295,362	455,385	673,352	▲357.7%	▲4
4	China	142,780	206,588	318,969	509,558	549,618	▲166.0%	Steady
5	New Zealand	355,765	389,465	483,398	518,462	530,492	▲36.2%	▼2
6	Philippines	103,942	120,540	171,233	232,391	293,892	▲143.8%	▲3
7	Vietnam	154,831	159,850	185,039	219,351	257,997	▲61.4%	▼1
8	South Africa	79,425	104,132	145,683	162,450	189,207	▲81.7%	▲4
9	Malaysia	78,858	92,335	116,196	138,363	165,616	▲79.4%	▲4
10	Italy	218,718	199,124	185,402	174,042	163,326	▼18.0%	▼5
11	Sri Lanka	53,461	62,256	86,412	109,850	131,904	▲111.9%	▲6
12	Nepal		4,566	24,635	54,757	122,506	▲2583.0%	▲69
13	Scotland	137,252	130,206	133,432	119,416	118,496	▼5.0%	▼9
14	South Korea	38,900	52,763	74,538	98,775	102,092	▲93.5%	▲5
15	United States	53,694	61,721	77,009	86,126	101,309	▲64.1%	▲3
16	Germany	108,220	106,524	108,002	102,594	101,255	▼4.9%	▼5
17	Hong Kong	67,122	71,803	74,955	86,886	100,148	▲39.5%	▼1
18	Iraq	24,832	32,520	48,169	67,353	92,922	▲185.7%	▲11
19	Greece	116,431	109,990	99,938	93,740	92,314	▼16.1%	▼9
20	Pakistan		16,993	30,221	61,918	89,633	▲427.5%	▲30
21	Lebanon	71,349	74,849	76,450	78,649	87,340	▲16.7%	▼6
22	Indonesia	47,158	50,974	63,159	73,218	87,075	▲70.8%	Steady
23	Thailand	23,600	30,554	45,464	66,228	83,779	▲174.2%	▲9
24	Ireland	50,235	50,256	67,318	74,891	80,927	▲61.0%	▼1
25	Iran		22,549	34,454	58,112	70,899	▲214.4%	▲15
26	Fiji	44,261	48,142	56,978	61,472	68,947	▲43.2%	▼2
27	Netherlands	83,324	78,924	76,046	70,172	66,481	▼15.8%	▼13
28	Singapore	33,485	39,972	48,647	54,934	61,056	▲52.7%	▼1
29	Afghanistan		16,751	28,598	46,799	59,797	▲257.0%	▲22
30	Bangladesh		16,096	27,808	42,420	51,491	▲219.9%	▲22
31	Canada	27,289	31,614	38,871	43,053	50,223	▲58.9%	▼1
32	Taiwan		24,370	28,627	46,822	49,511	▲103.2%	▲5
33	Brazil		7,493	14,508	27,625	46,720	▲523.5%	▲38
34	Poland	58,110	52,254	48,677	45,370	45,884	▼12.2%	▼14
35	Japan		30,778	35,377	42,420	45,267	▲47.1%	▼4
36	Croatia	51,909	50,996	48,828	43,687	43,302	▼15.1%	▼15
37	Egypt		33,496	36,532	39,776	43,213	▲29.0%	▼9
38	North Macedonia	43,527	40,656	40,222	38,986	41,786	▲2.8%	▼12
39	Zimbabwe		20,155	30,251	34,789	39,714	▲97.0%	▲4
40	Myanmar		12,378	21,760	32,656	39,171	▲216.5%	▲18
41	Cambodia		24,528	28,329	33,152	39,043	▲59.2%	▼5
42	Turkey	29,821	30,490	32,844	32,183	38,568	▲26.5%	▼9
43	France	17,268	19,186	24,675	31,120	36,019	▲87.7%	▲1
44	Malta	46,998	43,700	41,274	37,609	35,413	▼19.0%	▼19
45	Colombia		5,709	11,317	18,991	35,033	▲513.6%	▲31
46	Papua New Guinea		24,021	26,787	28,803	29,984	▲24.8%	▼8
47	Chile		23,304	24,936	26,082	29,860	▲28.1%	▼8
48	Wales		25,313	28,675	28,046	29,250	▲15.6%	▼14
49	Syria		6,968	8,391	15,324	29,096	▲317.6%	▲24
50	Samoa		15,240	19,092	24,016	28,107	▲84.4%	▲4
51	Bosnia and Herzegovina		24,631	25,682	23,959	26,171	▲6.3%	▼16
52	Mauritius		18,173	23,279	24,324	25,981	▲43.0%	▼5
53	Serbia		17,327	20,205	20,267	25,454	▲46.9%	▼4
54	Russia		15,354	18,277	20,429	23,864	▲55.4%	▼1
55	Northern Ireland		21,296	22,596	23,020	22,995	▲8.0%	▼14
56	Kenya		9,935	13,831	17,654	22,348	▲124.9%	▲6
57	Argentina		11,368	11,985	13,343	17,977	▲58.1%	▲3
58	Spain		12,276	13,056	15,391	17,281	▲40.8%	▲1
59	Portugal		15,194	15,328	15,806	17,050	▲12.2%	▼4
60	Cyprus		18,383	18,070	16,936	16,737	▼9.0%	▼14
61	Hungary		20,161	19,091	17,899	16,655	▼17.4%	▼19
62	Sudan		19,049	19,370	17,029	16,609	▼12.8%	▼17
63	Romania		13,878	14,050	14,387	15,268	▲10.0%	▼7
64	Austria		17,927	17,010	15,390	14,403	▼19.7%	▼16
65	Ethiopia		5,634	8,452	11,791	14,092	▲150.1%	▲12
66	Ukraine		13,666	13,990	13,366	14,055	▲2.8%	▼9
67	United Arab Emirates		2,974	4,898	8,226	13,063	▲339.2%	▲22
68	Switzerland		11,261	11,942	12,128	13,017	▲15.6%	▼7
69	Nigeria		2,500	4,519	8,487	12,883	▲415.3%	▲25
70	Tonga		7,582	9,209	9,967	12,260	▲61.7%	▼1
71	Bhutan		139	2,455	5,953	12,002	▲8534.5%	▲97
72	Saudi Arabia		3,482	10,517	12,578	11,684	▲235.6%	▲14
73	Peru		6,322	8,440	9,554	11,531	▲82.4%	▲1
74	Israel		7,788	9,228	9,820	11,035	▲41.7%	▼6
75	Laos		9,375	9,932	10,401	10,948	▲16.8%	▼10
76	Sweden		7,499	8,353	9,554	10,847	▲44.6%	▼6
77	El Salvador		9,397	9,651	9,573	10,119	▲7.7%	▼14
78	Timor-Leste	0	0	9,225	9,242	9,761	N/A	▲119
79	Uruguay		9,381	9,237	8,992	9,205	▼1.9%	▼15
80	Denmark		8,967	9,026	8,790	8,874	▼1.0%	▼14
81	South Sudan	0	0	3,486	7,697	8,255	NA	▲116
82	Somalia		4,314	5,686	7,668	8,101	▲87.8%	Steady
83	Jordan		3,719	4,620	5,914	7,959	▲114.0%	▲1
84	Finland		7,947	7,939	7,711	7,831	▼1.5%	▼17
85	Czech Republic		7,179	7,438	7,705	7,776	▲8.3%	▼13
86	Belgium		5,061	5,762	6,377	7,203	▲42.3%	▼7
87	Cook Islands		5,027	6,091	6,830	7,112	▲41.5%	▼7
88	Zambia		4,078	5,537	6,237	6,847	▲67.9%	▼5
89	Mexico		1,802	3,255	4,871	6,845	▲279.9%	▲13
90	Kuwait		2,876	4,060	6,016	6,815	▲137.0%	Steady
91	Venezuela		1,539	3,404	5,460	6,627	▲330.6%	▲13
92	Ghana		2,769	3,866	5,283	6,322	▲128.3%	▼1
93	DR Congo		618	2,575	4,095	6,148	▲894.8%	▲38
94	Eritrea		2,015	2,841	4,301	5,629	▲179.4%	▲4
95	Mongolia		243	667	2,274	5,397	▲2121.0%	▲60
96	Slovenia		6,220	6,099	5,556	5,076	▼18.4%	▼21
97	Slovakia		3,323	3,939	4,428	4,781	▲43.9%	▼10
98	Tanzania		2,300	3,437	3,831	4,371	▲90.0%	▼2
99	Uganda		1,712	2,675	3,368	4,163	▲143.2%	▲4
100	Bulgaria		2,677	2,915	3,287	3,718	▲38.9%	▼8

== Foreign-born population by state/territory ==
As per the 2016 Census, while 6 out of every 10 migrants live in Victoria or New South Wales, there had been a noticeable increase in the number of migrants that settled down Western Australia and Queensland.

In 2016, among all the capital cities in Australia, Sydney – at 1,773,496 – had the highest overseas-born population. Melbourne, on the other hand, had 1,520,253 overseas-born individuals living in the city as per the 2016 Census. Perth, with 702,545 in 2016, came in at the third spot on the list of cities with the highest number of overseas-born population.2

According to the 2016 Census, among all the Australian states and territories, Western Australia had the largest population of overseas-born individuals.

New South Wales

The following table shows New South Wales' population by country of birth during historical census years. The top 10 countries are shown.

Rank	Place of birth	Estimated resident population, 2006 census	Estimated resident population, 2011 census	Estimated resident population, 2016 census	Estimated resident population, 2021 census	% Change 2006-2021	Rank movement 2006-2021
1	Australia	4,521,157	4,747,374	4,899,091	5,277,497	▲16.7%	Steady
2	mainland China	114,044	156,034	234,506	247,595	▲117.1%	▲1
3	England	218,837	227,521	226,561	231,385	▲5.7%	▼1
4	India	57,155	95,387	143,459	208,962	▲265.6%	▲3
5	New Zealand	106,614	114,230	117,138	118,527	▲11.2%	▼1
6	Philippines	57,719	70,388	86,752	106,930	▲85.3%	Steady
7	Vietnam	63,791	71,838	84,129	97,995	▲53.6%	▼2
8	Nepal	3,095	15,296	32,122	64,946	▲2000.0%	▲62
9	Lebanon	55,778	56,295	57,375	63,293	▲13.5%	▼1
10	Iraq	20,531	29,342	40,276	55,353	▲169.6%	▲10

Victoria

The following table shows Victoria's population by country of birth during historical census years. The top 10 countries are shown.

Rank	Place of birth	Estimated resident population, 2006 census	Estimated resident population, 2011 census	Estimated resident population, 2016 census	Estimated resident population, 2021 census	% Change 2006-2021	Rank movement 2006-2021
1	Australia	3,434,472	3,670,934	3,845,494	4,228,667	▲23.1%	Steady
2	India	52,852	111,787	169,808	258,193	▲388.5%	▲7
3	England	163,957	172,068	171,444	174,552	▲6.5%	▼1
4	mainland China	56,564	93,896	160,652	171,447	▲203.1%	▲2
5	New Zealand	63,995	80,234	93,254	99,344	▲55.2%	▼1
6	Vietnam	58,873	68,296	80,790	93,598	▲59.0%	▼1
7	Philippines	27,338	38,002	51,287	68,463	▲150.4%	▲6
8	Sri Lanka	31,480	43,991	55,833	68,066	▲116.2%	▲1
9	Italy	82,851	76,908	70,530	64,796	▼21.8%	▼6
10	Malaysia	30,474	39,790	50,048	62,662	▲105.6%	Steady

Queensland

The following table shows Queensland's population by country of birth during historical census years. The top 10 countries are shown.

Rank	Place of birth	Estimated resident population, 2006 census	Estimated resident population, 2011 census	Estimated resident population, 2016 census	Estimated resident population, 2021 census	% Change 2006-2021	Rank movement 2006-2021
1	Australia	2,935,258	3,192,114	3,343,659	3,679,899	▲25.4%	Steady
2	New Zealand	148,761	192,036	201,202	208,572	▲40.2%	▲1
3	England	161,421	179,495	180,775	191,731	▲18.8%	▼1
4	India	10,973	30,259	49,144	71,819	▲554.4%	▲10
5	mainland China	15,058	27,036	47,111	55,762	▲270.3%	▲4
6	Philippines	18,711	29,462	39,656	51,529	▲175.4%	▲1
7	South Africa	22,714	35,549	40,133	49,699	▲118.8%	▼3
8	Vietnam	13,086	16,269	19,547	24,455	▲86.9%	▲3
9	Scotland	22,446	24,057	21,881	22,756	▲1.4%	▼4
10	Germany	20,111	21,027	20,387	20,981	▲4.3%	▼4

South Australia

The following table shows South Australia's population by country of birth during historical census years. The top 10 countries are shown.

Rank	Place of birth	Estimated resident population, 2006 census	Estimated resident population, 2011 census	Estimated resident population, 2016 census	Estimated resident population, 2021 census	% Change 2006-2021	Rank movement 2006-2021
1	Australia	1,120,083	1,170,789	1,192,549	1,273,353	▲13.7%	Steady
2	England	101,497	102,681	97,392	95,248	▼6.2%	Steady
3	India	6,827	18,739	27,592	44,881	▲557.4%	▲8
4	mainland China	8,076	15,932	24,609	25,709	▲218.4%	▲5
5	Vietnam	10,546	12,025	14,338	17,033	▲61.6%	▲3
6	Italy	22,485	20,708	18,537	16,653	▼25.9%	▼3
7	Philippines	5,441	8,858	12,460	15,503	▲184.9%	▲7
8	New Zealand	11,364	12,848	12,933	13,461	▲18.5%	▼2
9	Scotland	14,291	13,902	11,991	11,470	▼19.7%	▼5
10	Germany	11,969	11,410	10,118	9,489	▼20.7%	▼5

Western Australia

The following table shows Western Australia's population by country of birth during historical census years. The top 10 countries are shown.

Rank	Place of birth	Estimated resident population, 2006 census	Estimated resident population, 2011 census	Estimated resident population, 2016 census	Estimated resident population, 2021 census	% Change 2006-2021	Rank movement 2006-2021
1	Australia	1,279,222	1,407,808	1,492,841	1,648,794	▲28.9%	Steady
2	England	174,191	191,932	194,164	196,885	▲13.0%	Steady
3	New Zealand	47,331	70,734	79,222	75,591	▲59.7%	Steady
4	India	15,156	29,915	49,384	61,088	▲303.2%	▲4
5	South Africa	22,050	35,326	41,008	44,889	▲103.6%	Steady
6	Philippines	6,831	17,231	30,835	37,524	▲449.3%	▲10
7	Malaysia	19,719	24,967	29,124	32,282	▲63.7%	Steady
8	mainland China	8,004	16,692	27,077	28,415	▲255.0%	▲6
9	Scotland	24,418	27,185	26,059	26,146	▲7.1%	▼5
10	Italy	20,934	19,477	19,204	18,175	▼13.2%	▼4

Tasmania

The following table shows Tasmania's population by country of birth during historical census years. The top 10 countries are shown.

Rank	Place of birth	Estimated resident population, 2006 census	Estimated resident population, 2011 census	Estimated resident population, 2016 census	Estimated resident population, 2021 census	% Change 2006-2021	Rank movement 2006-2021
1	Australia	396,659	414,260	411,490	440,809	▲11.1%	Steady
2	England	18,921	19,468	18,778	19,283	▲1.9%	Steady
3	mainland China	962	1,914	3,031	6,830	▲610.0%	▲7
4	Nepal	21	294	810	6,219	▲29,514.3%	▲90
5	India	804	1,468	1,980	6,137	▲663.3%	▲8
6	New Zealand	4,158	4,927	4,980	5,483	▲31.9%	▼3
7	Philippines	960	1,267	1,616	2,441	▲154.3%	▲4
8	Scotland	2,693	2,715	2,283	2,280	▼15.3%	▼4
9	Netherlands	2,435	2,376	2,196	2,136	▼12.3%	▼4
10	South Africa	1,069	1,512	1,521	2,089	▲95.4%	▼2

Australian Capital Territory

The following table shows the ACT's population by country of birth during historical census years. The top 10 countries are shown.

Rank	Place of birth	Estimated resident population, 2006 census	Estimated resident population, 2011 census	Estimated resident population, 2016 census	Estimated resident population, 2021 census	% Change 2006-2021	Rank movement 2006-2021
1	Australia	236,459	255,052	270,036	306,896	▲29.8%	Steady
2	India	2,738	5,887	10,414	17,203	▲528.2%	▲3
3	England	12,995	13,048	12,758	13,245	▲1.9%	▼1
4	mainland China	3,544	6,591	11,348	12,149	▲242.7%	Steady
5	Nepal	69	287	766	5,689	▲8,145.0%	▲81
6	New Zealand	3,915	4,386	4,728	5,122	▲30.9%	▼3
7	Philippines	1,663	2,422	3,797	5,058	▲204.1%	▲5
8	Vietnam	2,371	2,956	3,336	4,082	▲72.1%	▼2
9	United States	1,985	2,416	2,776	3,371	▲69.8%	▲1
10	Sri Lanka	1,608	2,268	2,775	3,304	▲105.5%	▲3

Northern Territory

The following table shows the NT's population by country of birth during historical census years. The top 10 countries are shown.

Rank	Place of birth	Estimated resident population, 2006 census	Estimated resident population, 2011 census	Estimated resident population, 2016 census	Estimated resident population, 2021 census	% Change 2006-2021	Rank movement 2006-2021
1	Australia	148,169	158,033	157,524	161,568	▲9.0%	Steady
2	Philippines	1,871	3,586	5,912	6,391	▲241.6%	▲2
3	England	5,082	5,322	5,584	5,053	▼0.6%	▼1
4	India	587	1,917	3,595	5,045	▲759.2%	▲8
5	New Zealand	3,295	3,968	4,635	4,041	▲22.6%	▼2
6	Nepal	30	350	1,126	2,994	▲9,880.0%	▲61
7	mainland China	325	865	1,196	1,705	▲424.6%	▲12
8	Indonesia	764	999	1,119	1,439	▲88.4%	▲2
9	Vietnam	556	670	935	1,350	▲142.8%	▲5
10	Sri Lanka	271	447	777	1,259	▲364.9%	▲13

== See also ==
- Visa policy of Australia
- Demography of Australia
- Department of Immigration and Border Protection
- Immigration to Australia
- Post war immigration to Australia
- Multiculturalism in Australia
- Asylum in Australia
