= European Australians =

Australians of European ancestry

Total population
- 17,127,441 (2021 census); 57.2% of the Australian population (Note: Number of ancestry responses classified within the "North-West European" and "Southern and Eastern European" groups under the Australian Standard Classification of Cultural and Ethnic Groups as a proportion of the total population. Ancestry figures do not amount to 100% as the Australian Bureau of Statistics allows up to two ancestry responses per person.) (Note: Does not include those nominating their ancestry as "Australian", who are categorised within the Oceanian group. The Australian Bureau of Statistics has stated that most people nominating "Australian" ancestry have at least partial Anglo-Celtic European ancestry.); English Australians: 8,385,928; Irish Australians: 2,410,833; Scottish Australians: 2,176,777; Italian Australians: 1,108,364; German Australians: 1,026,138; Greek Australians: 424,744; Dutch Australians: 381,948; Polish Australians: 209,281; Maltese Australians: 198,989; Croatian Australians: 164,362; Welsh Australians: 156,108; French Australians: 148,927; Spanish Australians: 128,693; Macedonian Australians: 111,352; Serbian Australians: 116,064

Regions with significant populations
- All states and territories of Australia

Languages
- Predominantly Australian English; Italian • German • Greek • Dutch • Other European languages

Religion
- Traditionally Christianity and Judaism

European Australians, or Australians of European descent (colloquially known as White Australians), are citizens or residents of Australia whose ancestry, or part of it, is traced back to the peoples of the area now described as Europe. They form the largest panethnic group in the country. At the 2021 census, the number of ancestry responses categorised within European ancestral groups as a proportion of the total population amounted to more than 57.2% (46% North-West European and 11.2% Southern and Eastern European). It is impossible to properly quantify the precise proportion of the population with (some) European ancestry for both definitional, scientific and mathematical reasons. For instance, many census recipients nominated two European ancestries—as well they might, given the nature of ancestry—tending towards an overcount. (As well, respondents were limited to the nomination of a maximum of two ancestries on that question.) Conversely, 29.9% of census recipients nominated "Australian" ancestry (categorised within the Oceanian ancestry group, although most of them are likely to have had some Anglo-Celtic or European ancestors), tending towards an undercount.

Since the early 19th century, people of European descent have formed the majority of the population in Australia. European-originating ideas, values, systems of government and law, and immigrants, have been widely adopted and influential in Australian culture, government and society, leading to the assessment of Australia as a partly European-derived country.

The majority of European Australians are of British Isles – English, Irish, Scottish, or Welsh – ancestral origin. While not an official ancestral classification, they are often referred to as Anglo-Celtic Australians. Other significant ancestries include Italian, German, Greek, Dutch, European New Zealanders, Polish, Maltese, and Scandinavian.

== Classification ==
The Australian Bureau of Statistics (ABS) and its quinquennial Australian Census does not collect data based on race, at least not directly. Instead, it collects information on distinct ancestries, of which census respondents can select up to two (but no more than two). The notion of ancestry used by respondents to the census question—and taken up by this article—thus relies on individual self-identification of one's 'ancestry', adding further ambiguity to an already contested notion that perhaps sits closer to personal self-identification as part of a (historical) socio-cultural group than precise genetic derivation.

Nevertheless, for the purposes of aggregating data usefully, the Australian Bureau of Statistics in its Australian Standard Classification of Cultural and Ethnic Groups (ASCCEG) has grouped certain ancestries into certain categories, including the following two broad European groupings:

- North-West European Australians, including Austrian Australians, Belgian Australians, Danish Australians, Dutch Australians, English Australians, Cornish Australians, Finnish Australians, French Australians, German Australians, Icelandic Australians, Irish Australians, Norwegian Australians, Scottish Australians, Swedish Australians and Welsh Australians
- Southern and Eastern European Australians, including Albanian Australians, Belarusian Australians, Bosnian Australians, Bulgarian Australians, Croatian Australians, Cypriot Australians, Czech Australians, Estonian Australians, Greek Australians, Hungarian Australians, Italian Australians, Latvian Australians, Lithuanian Australians, Macedonian Australians, Maltese Australians, Montenegrin Australians, Polish Australians, Portuguese Australians, Romanian Australians, Russian Australians, Serbian Australians, Slovak Australians, Slovene Australians, Spanish Australians, Turkish Australians and Ukrainian Australians

While officially part of the North-West European classification, Australians of English, Irish, Scottish, Welsh or Cornish ancestral origins are often informally referred to as Anglo-Celtic Australians.

The Australian Bureau of Statistics has stated that most people nominating "Australian" ancestry have at least partial Anglo-Celtic European ancestry, although they are officially categorised as part of the Oceanian group.

== History ==
From at least 60,000 B.C. the area that was to become New South Wales was inhabited entirely by indigenous Aboriginal and Torres Strait Islander peoples with traditional social, legal organisation and land rights. The population of New South Wales was at least 100,000 with many tribal, clan and language groups. There were several tribes living in the Sydney region including the Kuringai whose appearance prompted the first Governor, Captain Arthur Phillip, to describe them as "Manly", the description surviving in the name of one of Sydney's best-known beach suburbs. However, once European settlement began, Aboriginal rights to traditional lands were disregarded and the Aboriginal people of the Sydney region were almost obliterated by introduced diseases and, to a lesser extent, armed force. First contacts were relatively peaceful but Aboriginal people and their culture were as unfamiliar to Europeans, initially, as the landscape, flora and fauna of the new land. The anonymous convict artist now known only as 'The Port Jackson Painter' had more success than most early artists in depicting the appearance and lifestyle of the Sydney Aboriginal people.

=== Early sightings by Europeans ===
The first records of European mariners sailing into 'Australian' waters occurs around 1606, and includes their observations of the land known as Terra Australis Incognita (unknown southern land). The first ship and crew to chart the Australian coast and meet with Aboriginal people was the Duyfken captained by Dutchman, Willem Janszoon.

Between 1606 and 1770, an estimated 54 European ships from a range of nations made contact. Many of these were merchant ships from the Dutch East Indies Company and included the ships of Abel Tasman. Tasman charted parts of the north, west and south coasts of Australia which was then known as New Holland.

Seebaer van Nieuwelant (born 27 July 1623), son of Willemtgen and Willem Janszoon, was born south of Dirk Hartog Island, in present-day Western Australia. Nieuwelant was the First white child born in Australia.

In 1770, Englishman Lieutenant James Cook charted the Australian east coast in his ship HM Barque Endeavour. Cook wrote that he claimed the east coast for King George III of Great Britain on 22 August 1770 when standing on Possession Island off the west coast of Cape York Peninsula, naming eastern Australia "New South Wales'. The coast of Australia, featuring Tasmania as a separate island, was mapped in detail by the English mariners and navigators Bass and Flinders, and the French mariner, Baudin. A nearly completed map of the coastline was published by Flinders in 1814.

This period of European exploration is reflected in the names of landmarks such as the Torres Strait, Arnhem Land, Dampier Sound, Tasmania, the Furneaux Islands, Cape Frecinyet and La Perouse. French expeditions between 1790 and the 1830s, led by D'Entrecasteaux, Baudin, and Furneaux, were recorded by the naturalists Labillardière and Péron.

Luis Vaez de Torres from Spain was also one of the first Europeans to explore Australia.

=== First settlement by Europeans ===
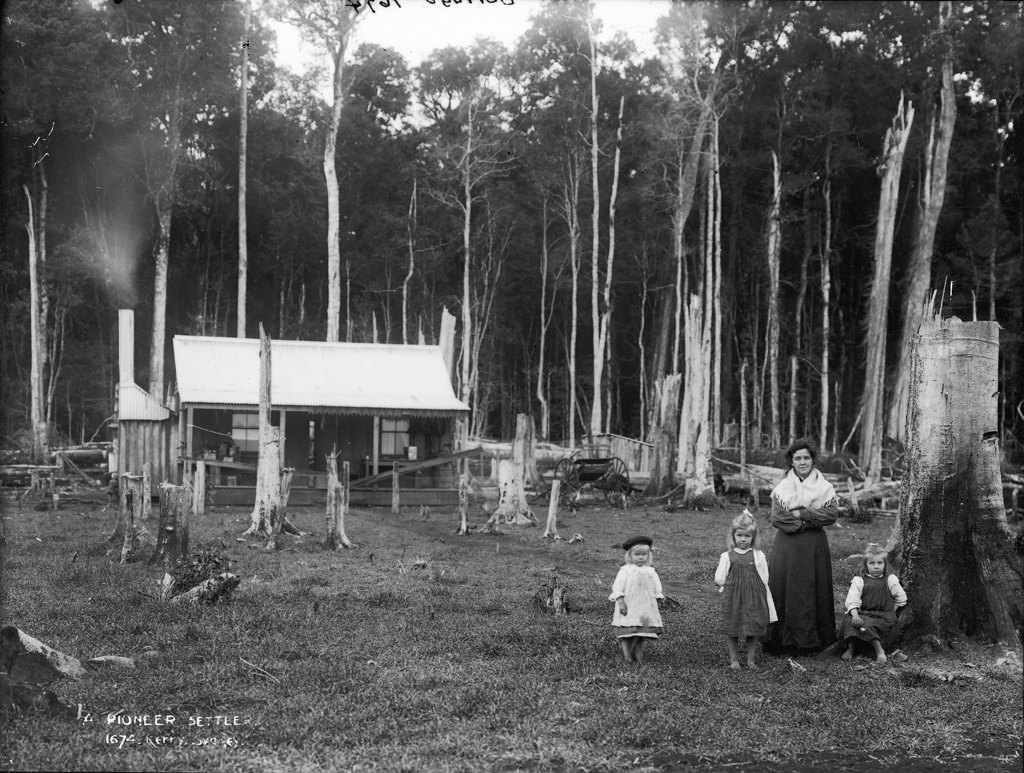
A pioneering settler family, circa 1900

The British Crown Colony of New South Wales started with the establishment of a settlement at Sydney Cove by Captain Arthur Phillip on 26 January 1788. This date later became Australia's national day, Australia Day. These land masses included the current islands of New Zealand, which was administered as part of New South Wales until it became a separate colony in 1841. Van Diemen's Land, now known as Tasmania, was first settled in 1803.

=== British and Irish settlers ===
The first European Australians came from United Kingdom and Ireland.

The First white child born in New South Wales was Rebecca Small (22 September 1789 – 30 January 1883), was born in Port Jackson, the eldest daughter of John Small a boatswain in the First Fleet which arrived at Botany Bay in January 1788.

The First white child born in Victoria was William James Hobart Thorne (25 November 1803 – 2 July 1872) was born at Port Phillip, in what was still part of New South Wales but became Victoria

Other British settlements followed, at various points around the continent, most of them unsuccessful. In 1824, a penal colony was established near the mouth of the Brisbane River (the basis of the later colony of Queensland). In 1826, a British military camp was established in Western Australia at King George Sound, to discourage French colonisation. (The camp formed the basis of the later town of Albany.) In 1829, the Swan River Colony and its capital of Perth were founded on the west coast proper and also assumed control of King George Sound. Initially a free colony, Western Australia later accepted British convicts, because of an acute labour shortage.

The British Colonial Office in 1835 issued the Proclamation of Governor Bourke, implementing the legal doctrine of terra nullius upon which British settlement was based, reinforcing the notion that the land belonged to no one prior to the British Crown taking possession of it and quashing earlier treaties with Aboriginal peoples, such as that signed by John Batman. Its publication meant that from then, all people found occupying land without the authority of the government would be considered illegal trespassers.

Separate colonies were created from parts of New South Wales: South Australia in 1836, New Zealand in 1840, Victoria in 1851, and Queensland in 1859. The Northern Territory was founded in 1863 as part of South Australia. The transportation of convicts to Australia was phased out between 1840 and 1868.

The European population grew from 0.3 percent of the population of the continent at 1800 to 58.6 percent at 1850. In 1868, the population of European Australians was 1,539,552.

Massive areas of land were cleared for agriculture and various other purposes, in addition to the obvious impacts this early clearing of land had on the ecology of particular regions, it severely affected indigenous Australians, by reducing the resources they relied on for food, shelter and other essentials. This progressively forced them into smaller areas and reduced their numbers as the majority died of newly introduced diseases and lack of resources. Indigenous resistance against the settlers was widespread, and prolonged fighting between 1788 and the 1930s led to the deaths of at least 20,000 Indigenous people and between 2,000 and 2,500 Europeans.

Irish formed about 25 per cent of the European Australian population in the nineteenth century. Germans formed the largest non-British community for most of the 19th century.

In 1971, nine out of the top ten birthplace groups were from European countries and accounted for 77.2% of all people born overseas. People from the United Kingdom still form the largest group. However, their number as a proportion of the total overseas-born population has declined, falling from 40.6% (1,046,356) in 1971 to 17.7% (1,078,064) in 2016.

=== After World War II ===
Following World War II, the Australian government instigated a massive program of European immigration. After narrowly preventing a Japanese invasion and suffering attacks on Australian soil for the first time, it was seen that the country must "populate or perish". Prior to WWII, Australia had viewed itself as largely of British and Irish ancestry but after WWII the success of the United States and the reason for its success, that is largely the creation of a European diaspora, could not be ignored by Australia. Immigration brought traditional migrants from the United Kingdom along with, for the first time, large numbers of southern and central Europeans, as well as Eastern European Australians. A booming Australian economy stood in sharp contrast to war-ravaged Europe, and newly arrived migrants found employment in government-assisted programs such as the Snowy Mountains Scheme. Two million immigrants arrived between 1948 and 1975, many from Robert Menzies' newly founded Liberal Party of Australia dominated much of the immediate post-war era, defeating the Australian Labor Party government of Ben Chifley in 1949. Menzies oversaw the post-war expansion and became the country's longest-serving leader. Manufacturing industry, previously playing a minor part in an economy dominated by primary production, greatly expanded. Since the 1970s and the abolition of the White Australia policy from Asia and other parts of the world, Australia's demography, culture and image of itself has been radically transformed.

In 1987, the vast majority of European Australians were descendants either of Anglo-Irish-Scots who arrived after 1850, or of Greeks, Italians, Hungarians, South Slavs, Poles and Germans who emigrated after 1945.

== Demographics ==
Notably, Australia does not collect statistics on the racial origins of its residents, instead collecting data at each five-yearly census on distinct ancestries, of which each census respondent may choose up to two. At the 2021 census, the number of ancestry responses categorised within European ancestral groups as a proportion of the total population amounted to 57.2% (including 46% North-West European and 11.2% Southern and Eastern European). It is impossible to quantify the precise proportion of the population with European ancestry. For instance, many census recipients nominated two European ancestries, tending towards an overcount. Conversely, 29.9% of census recipients nominated "Australian" ancestry (categorised within the Oceanian ancestry group although the Australian Bureau of Statistics has stated that most of them are likely to have at least partial Anglo-Celtic or European ancestry), tending towards an undercount.

At the 2021 census, the most commonly nominated European ancestries were as set out in the following table.

Persons nominating European Australian ancestries in 2021
Ancestry	Population
English Australian	8,385,928
Irish Australian	2,410,833
Scottish Australian	2,176,777
Italian Australian	1,108,364
German Australian	1,026,138
Greek Australian	424,744
Dutch Australian	381,948
Polish Australian	209,281
Maltese Australian	198,989
Croatian Australian	164,362
Welsh Australian	156,108
French Australian	148,927
Spanish Australian	128,693
Macedonian Australian	111,352
Serbian Australian	94,997
Hungarian Australians	81,029
Armenian Australians	60,000

=== Historical demographics ===
European Australians from 1947 to 1966, when racial data was collected in the country

Australia enumerated its population by race between 1911 and 1966, by racial-origin in 1971 and 1976, and by self-declared ancestry since 1986. From 1986 onwards, only estimates can be obtained from ancestry. The 1991 and 1996 census did not include a question on ancestry.

The table shows the proportion of Australian residents identified a being of the European race and racial origin at various points in history according to census results. The first population count remained steady from 98.8% in 1911 to 98.7% in 1966 census. Note that for the 1976 census the non-response rate for the question on racial origin was 8.4% for Australia as a whole. In 2021, 29.9% of census recipients nominated "Australian" ancestry (categorised within the Oceanian ancestry group. The Australian Bureau of Statistics has stated that most of them are likely to have at least partial Anglo-Celtic European ancestry).

Australian census
Year	Population	Percent	Ref(s)
1911	4,402,662	98.8	
1921	5,387,143	99.1 ▲	
1933	6,579,993	99.2 ▲	
1947	7,524,129	99.3 ▲	
1954	8,921,691	99.3	
1961	10,418,761	99.2 ▼	
1966	11,453,375	98.7 ▼	
1976	TBD	96.22 ▼	
1987	-	93.0 ▼	
2016	-	76.0 ▼	
2021	-	57.2 ▼	

=== Ancestral origins ===
The following table shows the numbers of Australians claiming various European ancestries at selected national census historical intervals.

Ancestral origins	1986 / %		2001 / %		2006 / %		2011 / %		2016 / %	2021 / %		2026 / %	2011-16
(Albania) Albanian					11,313		13,142	0.1%	15,907	19,686			
(Australia) Australian	3,402,407	21.8%	6,739,594	35.9%	7,371,823	37.1%	7,098,486	33.0%	7,298,243				+2.81%
(Austria) Austrian					41,490		42,341	0.2%	44,411				
(Basque Country (autonomous community)) Basque					541	0.0%	612	0.0%					
(Belarus) Belarusian					1,560	0.0%	1,664	0.0%					
(Belgium) Belgian					8,896	0.0%	10,022	0.0%	11,968				
(Bosnia and Herzegovina) Bosnian					18,463	0.1%	20,247	0.1%	23,630				
(United Kingdom) British					5,681	0.0%	6,262	0.0%	9,385				
(Bulgaria) Bulgarian					4,898	0.0%	5,436	0.0%	6,766	8,039			
(Catalonia) Catalan					112	0.0%	171	0.0%					
Channel Islander					1,160	0.0%	1,127	0.0%					
(Croatia) Croatian					118,049	0.6%	126,270	0.6%	133,268	164,360			
(Cyprus) Cypriot					10,722	0.0%	22,680	0.1%					
(Czech Republic) Czech					21,194	0.1%	22,772	0.1%	24,475				
(Denmark) Danish					50,414	0.3%	54,026	0.3%	59,293				+9.75%
(Netherlands) Dutch					310,082		335,493	1.6%	339,549	381,946			+1.21%
(England) English	6,607,228	42.4%	6,358,880	33.9%	6,283,647	31.6%	7,238,533	33.7%-36.1%	7,852,224	8,385,928	33%		+8.48%
(Estonia) Estonian					8,234	0.0%	8,551	0.0%	9,580	11,598			+12.03%
(Finland) Finnish					20,987	0.1%	22,420	0.1%	24,144				+7.69%
(France) French					98,333		110,399	0.5%	135,382	148,922			+22.63%
(Canada) French Canadian					1,686	0.0%	1,836	0.0%					
(Germany) German					811,543		898,674	4.2%	982,226	1,026,138			+9.3%
Gibraltarian					184	0.0%	177	0.0%					
(Greece) Greek					365,150	1.8%	378,270	1.8%	397,431	424,750			+5.07%
(Hungary) Hungarian					67,623	0.3%	69,160	0.3%	73,614	81,029			+6.44%
(Iceland) Icelandic					759	0.0%	929	0.0%	1,088				+17.12%
(Republic of Ireland) Irish	902,679	5.8%	1,919,727	10.2%	1,803,736	9.1%	2,087,758	9.7%-10.4%	2,388,058	2,410,833	9.0%		+14.38%
(Italy) Italian					852,421		916,121	4.3%	1,000,006	1,108,364			+9.16%
(Latvia) Latvian					20,061	0.1%	20,124	0.1%	20,509				+1.91%
(Lithuania) Lithuanian					13,275	0.1%	13,594	0.1%	16,295	19,430			+19.87%
Luxembourg					167	0.0%	212	0.0%	236				+11.32%
(North Macedonia) Macedonian					83,983		93,570	0.4%	98,441	111,352			
(Malta) Maltese					153,802		163,990	0.8%	175,555	198,989			+7.05%
(Moldova) Moldovan					231	0.0%	374	0.0%					
(Montenegro) Montenegrin					1,168	0.0%	1,554	0.0%		2,720			
(Norway) Norwegian					20,442	0.1%	23,037	0.1%	26,258				+13.98%
(Poland) Polish					163,802	0.8%	170,354	0.8%	183,974	209,284			+8%
(Portugal) Portuguese					41,226	0.2%	46,519	0.2%	61,885				+33.03%
(Romania) Romanian					18,325	0.1%	20,998	0.1%	24,558	28,103			
(Russia) Russian					67,056		74,317	0.3%	85,657				+15.26%
(Scotland) Scottish	740,522	4.7%	540,046	2.9%	1,501,200	7.6%	1,792,622	8.3%	2,023,470	2,176,777	8.4%		+12.88%
(Serbia) Serbian					95,362		69,544	0.3%	73,901	94,997			
(Slovakia) Slovak					8,504	0.0%	10,053	0.0%	46,186				
(Slovenia) Slovene					16,085	0.1%	17,150	0.1%					
(Spain) Spanish					84,327		92,952	0.4%	119,956	128,693			
(Sweden) Swedish					30,378		34,029	0.2%	40,214				+18.18%
(Switzerland) Swiss					26,512	0.1%	28,947	0.1%	31,567				+9.05%
(Ukraine) Ukrainian					37,584	0.2%	38,791	0.2%					
(Wales) Welsh	no data	no data	84,246	no data	113,244	0.6%	125,597	0.6%	144,582	156,108	0.6%		+15.12%
(Europe) European					9,037		12,504	0.1%					
Total													
Source:1986, 2016

=== Population born in Europe ===
The following table shows the proportions of European-born and British Isles-born residents at various points in history.

Born in Europe - Australia
Year	European-born % of overseas-born		United Kingdom / Ireland % of overseas-born	Ref(s)
1861	671,049	92.8%		
1891	901,618	90.3%		
1901	753,832	88.5%	79.2%	
1911	664,671	88.3%	78.0%	
1921	744,429	89.1%	80.2%	
1933	807,358	89.7%	78.9%	
1947	651,606	87.8%	72.7%	
1954	1,155,064	90.3%	51.6%	
1961	1,596,212	90.2%	42.6%	
1966	1,893,511	88.9%	42.6%	
1971	2,196,478	85.7%	42.2%	
1976	2,210,817	81.3%		
1981	2,232,718	75.0%	41.1%	
1986	2,221,802	68.4%	34.7%	
1991	2,300,773	62.4%	31.17%	
1996	2,217,009	56.7%	28.7%	
2001	2,136,052	52.0%		
2006	2,077,907	47.1%		
2011	2,131,053	40.3%	20.8%	
2016	2,088,867	33.9%		
2021				
2026	TBD	TBD		

== Political involvement ==
=== Colonial period ===
As the earliest colonists of Australia, settlers from England and their descendants often held positions of power and made or helped make laws often because many had been involved in government back in England. In the original six separate British self-governing colonies of Queensland, New South Wales, Victoria, Tasmania, South Australia, and Western Australia agreed to unite and form the Commonwealth of Australia, establishing a system of federalism in Australia.

=== National founders ===
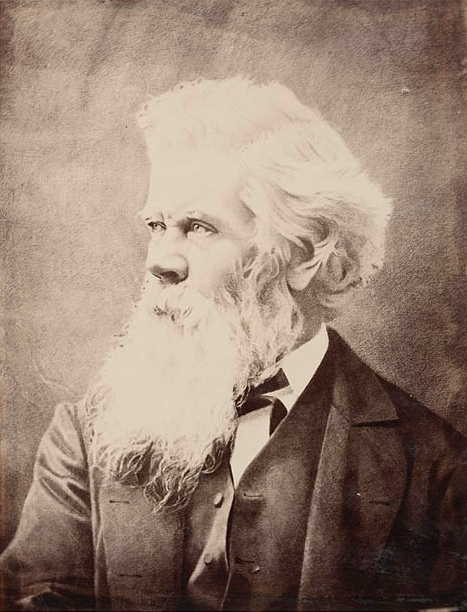
Sir Henry Parkes

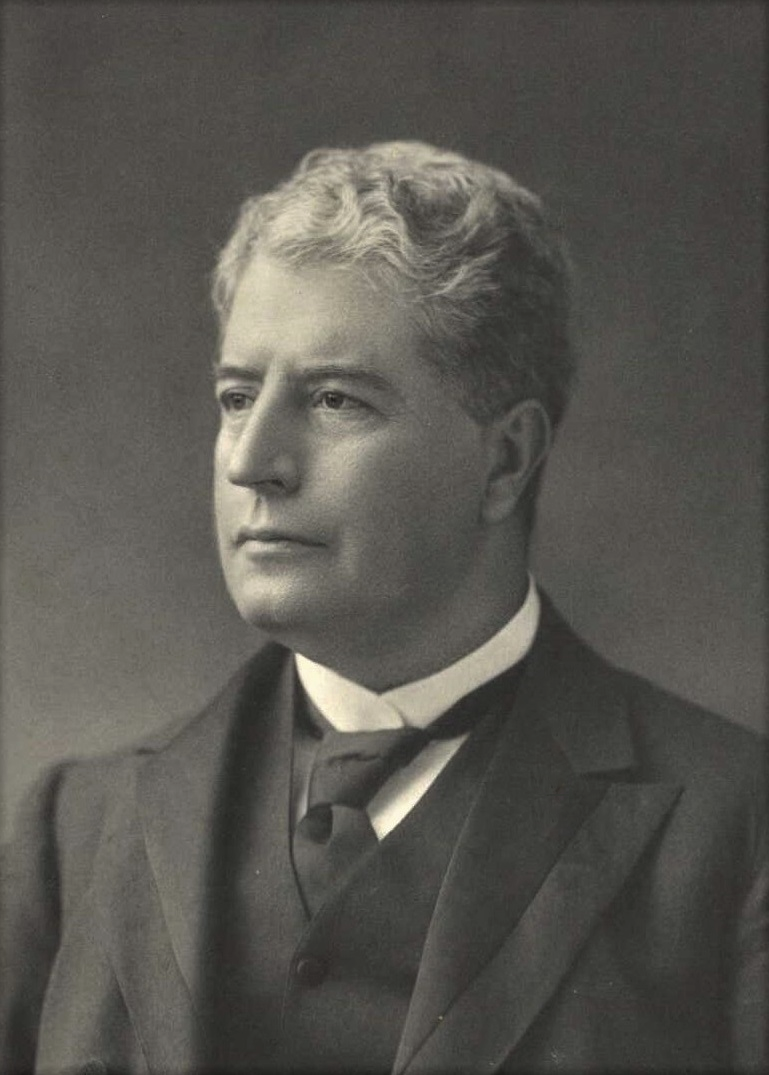
Edmund Barton

The lineage of most of the national founders was British (especially English), such as:

- Sir Henry Parkes is often regarded as the "Father of Federation" in Australia. During the late 19th century, he was the strongest proponent for a federation of Australian territories. Parkes died before Australia federated, and was never able to see his plan come to fruition.

Various other founders of Australia have also been unofficially recognised:

- Captain James Cook, the Englishman who claimed Australia
- Captain Arthur Phillip (Englishman), first governor of New South Wales and founder of the first colony
- Sir Edmund Barton (English parents), the first Australian prime minister.
- Scotsman Lachlan Macquarie is considered by historians to have had a crucial influence on the transition of New South Wales from a penal colony to a free settlement and therefore to have played a major role in the shaping of Australian society in the early nineteenth century. An inscription on his tomb on the Isle of Mull, Scotland describes him as "The Father of Australia".

== Culture ==
Children wave Australian flags during an Anzac Day parade in Palmerston, Australia.

European-Australian culture is integral to the culture of Australia. The culture of Australia is essentially a Western culture influenced by the unique geography of the Australian continent, the diverse input of Aboriginal, Torres Strait Islander and other Oceanian people, the British colonisation of Australia that began in 1788, and the various waves of multi-ethnic migration that followed.

As the English were always the largest element among the settlers, their cultural influence was naturally greater than that of the Irish, Welsh or Scots.

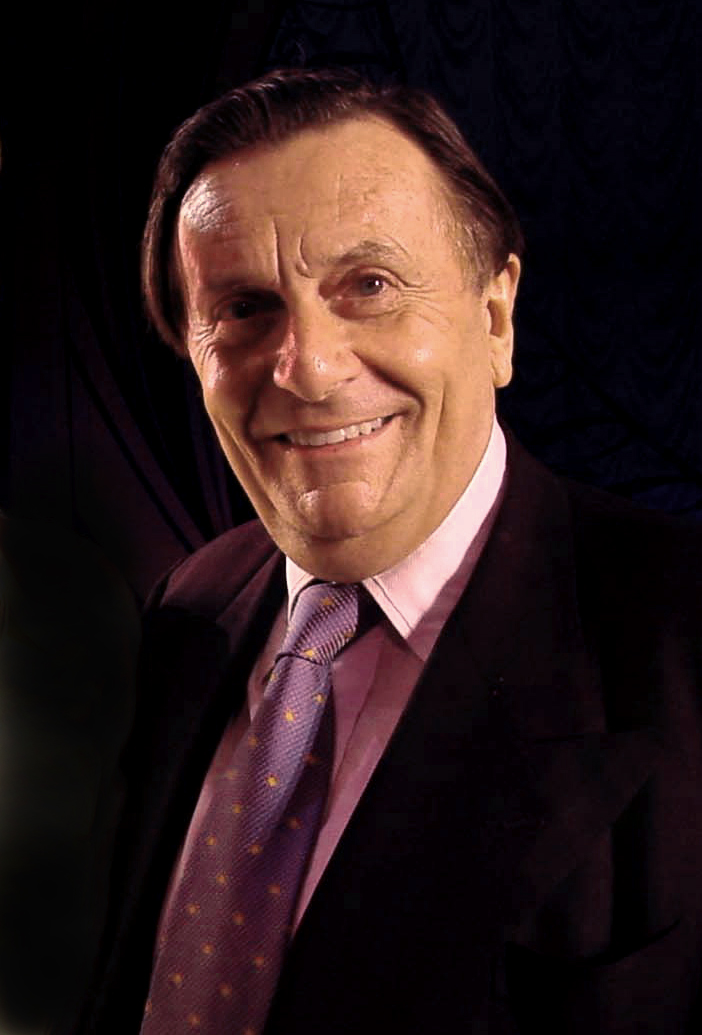
Australian comedian, actor and satirist Barry Humphries was of English and Irish heritage.

Evidence of a significant Anglo-Celtic heritage includes the predominance of the English language, the common law, the Westminster system of government, Christianity (Anglicanism) as the once dominant religion, and the popularity of sports such as cricket and rugby; all of which are part of the heritage that has shaped modern Australia. Australian culture has diverged significantly since British settlement.

Several states and territories had their origins as penal colonies, with the first British convicts arriving at Sydney Cove in 1788. Stories of outlaws like the bushranger Ned Kelly have endured in Australian music, cinema and literature. The Australian gold rushes from the 1850s brought wealth as well as new social tensions to Australia, including the miners' Eureka Stockade rebellion. The colonies established elected parliaments and rights for workers and women before most other Western nations.

=== Language ===
Australian English is a major variety of the English language and is used throughout Australia. Although English has no official status in the Constitution, Australian English is the country's de facto official language and is the first language of the majority of the population.

Australian English began to diverge from British English after the founding of the colony of New South Wales in 1788 and was recognised as being different from British English by 1820. It arose from the intermingling of early settlers from a great variety of mutually intelligible dialectal regions of the British Isles and quickly developed into a distinct variety of English. Australian English differs from other varieties of English in vocabulary, accent, pronunciation, register, grammar and spelling.

The earliest form of Australian English was first spoken by the children of the colonists born into the colony of New South Wales. This first generation of children created a new dialect that was to become the language of the nation. The Australian-born children in the new colony were exposed to a wide range of dialects from all over the British Isles, in particular from Ireland and South East England.

The native-born children of the colony created the new dialect from the speech they heard around them, and with it expressed mateship. Even when new settlers arrived, this new dialect was strong enough to blunt other patterns of speech.

A quarter of the convicts were Irish. Many had been arrested in Ireland, and some in Great Britain. Many, if not most, of the Irish convicts spoke either no English at all, or spoke it poorly and rarely. There were other significant populations of convicts from non-English speaking part of Britain, such as the Scottish Highlands and Wales.

The most commonly spoken European languages other than English in Australia are Italian, Greek and German.

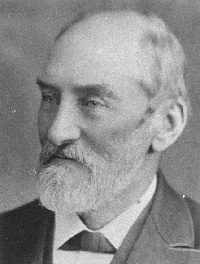
Peter McCormick composed "Advance Australia Fair".

=== Music ===
Another area of cultural influence are Australian patriotic songs:

- "Advance Australia Fair" is the national anthem of Australia - Created by the Scottish-born composer Peter Dodds McCormick, the song was first performed in 1878, and was sung in Australia as a patriotic song. It replaced "God Save the Queen". It did not gain its status as the official anthem until 1984, following a plebiscite to choose the national song in 1977.
- "Waltzing Matilda" is Australia's most widely known bush ballad, and has been described as the country's "unofficial national anthem". Scottish-Australian poet Banjo Paterson wrote the words to "Waltzing Matilda" in January 1895 while staying at Dagworth Station, a sheep and cattle station near Winton in western Queensland owned by the Macpherson family. The words were written to a tune played on a zither or autoharp by 31‑year‑old Christina Macpherson, one of the family members at the station.
- "The Song of Australia" - An English-born poet Caroline Carleton wrote the lyrics in 1859 for a competition sponsored by the Gawler Institute. The music for the song was composed by the German-born Carl Linger (1810-1862).

=== Architecture ===
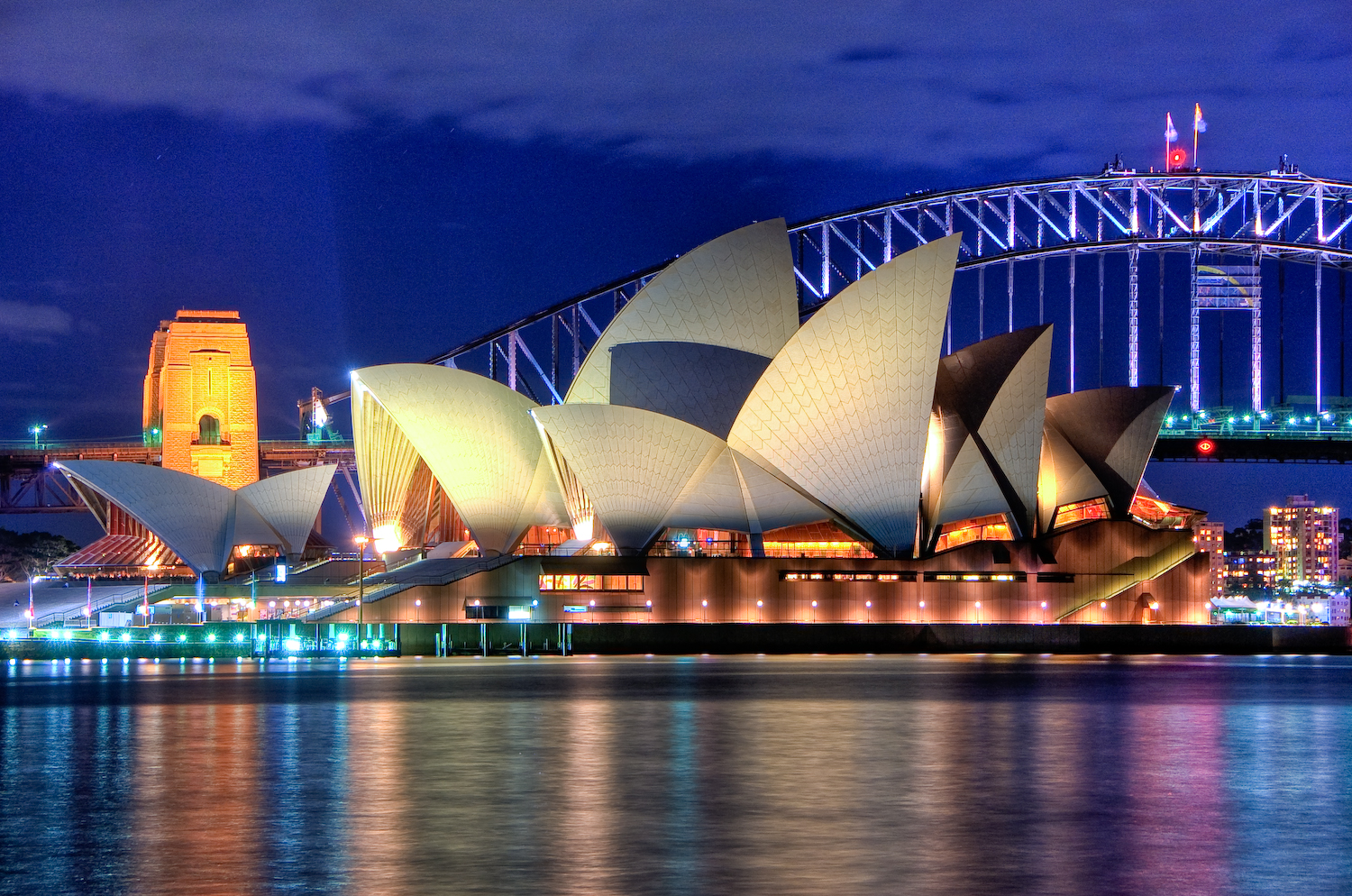
Australia's most recognisable building is the Sydney Opera House, designed by Danish architect Jørn Utzon.

The Sydney Opera House was formally opened on 20 October 1973, by Queen Elizabeth II. After a gestation beginning with Utzon's 1957 selection as winner of an international design competition. The government of New South Wales, led by the premier, Joseph Cahill, authorised work to begin in 1958 with Utzon directing construction. The government's decision to build Utzon's design is often overshadowed by circumstances that followed, including cost and scheduling overruns as well as the architect's ultimate resignation.

Australia has three architectural listings on UNESCO's World Heritage list: Australian Convict Sites (comprising a collection of separate sites around Australia, including Hyde Park Barracks in Sydney, Port Arthur in Tasmania, and Fremantle Prison in Western Australia); the Sydney Opera House; and the Royal Exhibition Building in Melbourne. Contemporary Australian architecture includes a number of other iconic structures, including the Harbour Bridge in Sydney and Parliament House, Canberra. Significant architects who have worked in Australia include Governor Lachlan Macquarie's colonial architect, Francis Greenway; the ecclesiastical architect William Wardell; the designer of Canberra's layout, Walter Burley Griffin; the modernist Harry Seidler; and Jørn Utzon, designer of the Sydney Opera House. The National Trust of Australia is a non-governmental organisation charged with protecting Australia's built heritage.

=== Religion ===
Christianity was brought to Australia by the British.

=== Cuisine ===
British colonists and Irish settlers brought European foods such as roast dinners, meat pies, and fish and chips to Australia.

== Prime Ministers ==
As of 2022, there have been 31 prime ministers of Australia. The ancestors of all these prime ministers have all been European and Anglo-Celtic (English, Scottish, Northern Irish, Welsh, or Irish). Some ancestors of four prime ministers did not emigrate from Britain or Ireland: some ancestors of Chris Watson were German (his father was German Chilean), some ancestors of Malcolm Fraser were European Jews, one of Tony Abbott's grandparents was Dutch, and Anthony Albanese's ancestors on his father's side were Italians.

1st Edmund Barton (English)
2nd Alfred Deakin (English, Welsh)
3rd Chris Watson (German, English)
4th George Reid (Scottish)
5th Andrew Fisher (Scottish)
6th Joseph Cook (English, Irish)
7th Billy Hughes (Welsh)
8th Stanley Bruce (Ulster Scottish, Irish)
9th James Scullin (Irish)
10th Joseph Lyons (Irish)
11th Earle Page (English, Scottish)
12th Robert Menzies (Scottish, Cornish)
13th Arthur Fadden (Irish, Northern Irish)
14th John Curtin (Irish)
15th Frank Forde (Irish)

16th Ben Chifley (Irish)
17th Harold Holt (English, Irish, German)
18th John McEwen (Ulster Scottish, English, Irish)
19th John Gorton (English, Irish, German)
20th William McMahon (Irish, English)
21st Gough Whitlam (English)
22nd Malcolm Fraser (Scottish, English-Jewish)
23rd Bob Hawke (Cornish)
24th Paul Keating (Irish, English)
25th John Howard (English, Scottish, Irish)
26th Kevin Rudd (English, Irish)
27th Julia Gillard (English, Irish, Welsh, Scottish)
28th Tony Abbott (English, Welsh, Dutch)
29th Malcolm Turnbull (English, Scottish)
30th Scott Morrison (Scottish, English, Irish)
31st Anthony Albanese (Irish, Italian)

== Breakdown ==
The following is a breakdown of the ethnic origins of Australians based on a 2018 study that used data from the 2016 census.

Cultural backgrounds of the Australian population
1. Anglo-Celtic European (58.0%)
2. Other European (18.0%)
3. Aboriginal (3.00%)
4. Other (21.0%)
Cultural backgrounds of senior leaders in Australian organisations
1. Anglo-Celtic European (75.9%)
2. Other European (19.0%)
3. Aboriginal (0.40%)
4. Other (4.70%)

== Health ==
European Australians are more likely to catch skin cancer.

== See also ==
- Demographics of Australia
- Europeans in Oceania
- First white child in Australia
- European diaspora
- Immigration to Australia
- White Australia policy (1901–1973)
- White demographic decline
- Australians
- ethnogenesis
- African Australians
- American Australians
- Arab Australians
- Asian Australians
- Black Australians
- Caribbean and West Indian Australians
- Latin American Australians
- North African and Middle Eastern Australians
- Romani people in Australia
- Australian Jews
- Racism in Australia
- Racial violence in Australia
- Genocide of Indigenous Australians – Destruction of Indigenous Australian peoples and their cultures
