= Dutch Australians =

Ethnic group

Nederlandse Australiërs

Total population
- 381,946 (by ancestry, 2021) (1.5% of the Australian population); 66,481 (by birth, 2021)

Regions with significant populations
- New South Wales, Victoria, South Australia, Queensland, Western Australia

Languages
- Australian English, Dutch

Religion
- Protestantism (Calvinism), Catholicism, Irreligion

Related ethnic groups
- Dutch people

Dutch Australians (Dutch: Nederlandse Australiërs; Afrikaans: Nederlandse Australiërs) refers to Australians of Dutch ancestry. They form one of the largest groups of the Dutch diaspora outside Europe. At the 2021 census, 381,946 people nominated Dutch ancestry (whether alone or in combination with another ancestry), representing 1.5% of the Australian population. At the 2021 census, there were 66,481 Australian residents who were born in the Netherlands.

== History ==
=== Early history ===
The history of the Dutch and Australia began with Captain Willem Janszoon, a Dutch seafarer, who was the first European to land on Australian soil (which he christened as New Holland) in 1606.

The Dutch East Indies Company (VOC) had its headquarters in the Far East in Batavia (now Jakarta) from 1619 but traded from many Asian harbours from 1602. The journey from the Netherlands to the Dutch East Indies would take more than a year by traditional route, but after the discovery of the Roaring Forties by Dutch Captain Hendrick Brouwer, who established the so-called Brouwer Route in 1611, the voyage would be cut short by months by taking a trajectory along the southern latitudes of the Indian Ocean. By 1617 all VOC ships were ordered to take that route.

The navigation technique of that time, known as dead reckoning, caused some ships to travel too far east and so they sighted the Australian west coast, and a small number of them were wrecked there. Dirk Hartog made the first European landing of the Australian west coast with a pewter plate in 1616. Known ships wrecked off that include the Batavia, the Vergulde Dreak, the Zuytdorp and the Zeewijk. The wreck of the Batavia on Houtman Abrolhos during her maiden voyage turned into a bloody mutiny, led by Jeronimus Corneliszoon, after the survivors had landed on an island and Commander Pelsaert had left to get help. On his return, he court-marshalled the mutineers, some of whom were hanged. Wouter Loos and Jan Pelgrom the Bie were convicted mutineers, but because of their youth, they put on the mainland with some provisions to fend for themselves. They became arguably the first convicts to be dumped on the mainland.

The most famous Dutch seafarer to explore the Australian coasts is Abel Tasman, who was the first to circumvigate the continent, in 1642–1643. He established that the land was not the gigantic legendary southern continent that included the South Pole and named the land New Holland. Tasmania, which Tasman had named Van Diemens Land and the Tasman Sea, were eventually named after him.

Most of the Australian coastline, excluding the east coast and the eastern part of the south coast, was first charted by VOC mariners. The continent would be renamed "Australia" in the 19th century.

=== 20th century ===
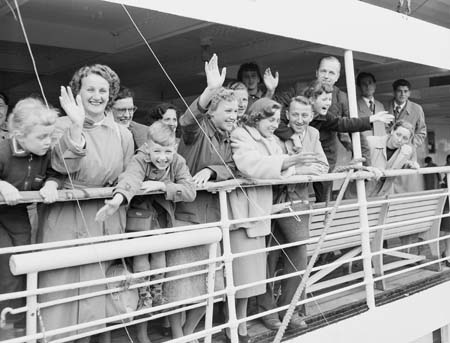
50,000 migrants arrived in 1950s

A number of people from the Dutch East Indies (present-day Indonesia) found their way to Australia during World War II and joined Allied forces in the fight against the Japanese. The Dutch East Indies government operated from Australia during the war. Free Dutch Submarines operated out of Fremantle after the invasion of Java. The joint No. 18 and No. 120 RAAF squadrons formed at Canberra, and was a combined Dutch and Australian Squadron. It used B-25 Mitchell bombers, supplied by the Dutch Government before the war. The Netherlands East Indies Forces Intelligence Service (NEFIS) was based in Melbourne during the war.

Post-war settlers in Australia arrived as part of Australia's assisted migration program. Many arrived by sea on the MS Johan van Oldenbarnevelt, while others flew with KLM.

== Demographics ==

At the 2021 census, 381,946 people nominated Dutch ancestry (whether alone or in combination with another ancestry), representing 1.5% of the Australian population. At the 2021 census, there were 66,481 Australian residents who were born in the Netherlands.

Besides Netherlands, large number of Australians with Dutch Ancestry have origin from South Africa, Indonesia and Sri Lanka. These countries have had a long and extensive History of Dutch Colonialism.

== Notable Dutch Australians ==
- Brendon Ah Chee, Australian rules footballer
- Callum Ah Chee, Australian rules footballer
- Leila Alcasid, singer and songwriter
- Beeb Birtles, musician
- Andrew Bolt, political commentator
- Dirk Bolt, architect
- Stephanie Brantz, sports presenter
- Paul Cox, filmmaker
- Guillaume Daniel Delprat, GM BHP
- Joe de Bruyn
- Mitchell Langerak
- Chris Vermeulen
- Kate Langbroek, broadcaster and comedian
- Dick Dusseldorp, filmmaker
- John Elferink
- Joanna Gash
- Kurt Lambeck, geophysicist and glaciologist
- Rolf de Heer, filmmaker
- Chris Hemsworth, actor
- Liam Hemsworth, actor
- Annita Keating van Iersel
- Hendrik (Hank) Koopman, country music artist
- Willy Lust, athlete
- Gerlof Mees, ornithologist, curator, and ichthyologist
- Dirk Nannes
- Jan Ruff O'Herne, human rights activist
- Ryan Papenhuyzen, rugby league player
- Nonja Peters
- Eric Roozendaal
- Roy Rene, comedian & vaudevillian
- Ben Rutten, Australian rules footballer
- Alexander Smits
- Lina Teoh, model, actress, TV host, former Channel [V] VJ, and former beauty queen (Miss World 1998), born to Dutch mother
- Harry Vanda
- Richard Vandenberg, Australian rules footballer
- Nathan Van Berlo, Australian rules footballer
- Timm van der Gugten, cricketer
- Paul Vander Haar Australian rules footballer
- Jacob van Rooyen Australian rules footballer
- Michelle van Eimeren, former beauty queen and former actress and TV host in the Philippines
- Dan van Holst Pellekaan - 14th Deputy Premier of South Australia
- Alfred van der Poorten, number theorist
- Peter van Onselen, author & academic
- Bert van Manen
- Jan Hendrik Scheltema, artist
- Tammy van Wisse
- Johnny Young
- Gus Winckel, military officer and pilot
- Richard Woldendorp, photographer
- Scott Edwards (cricketer), captain of The Netherlands Cricket team
- John van Lieshout, Queensland's richest person, from furniture stores and real estate development

== See also ==
- Australia–Netherlands relations
- Immigration history of Australia
- Belgian Australians
- Danish Australians
- French Australians
- German Australians
- Icelandic Australians
- Norwegian Australians
- South African Australians
- Swedish Australians
