= Nonja Peters =

Dutch-Australian writer and academic

Dr Nonja Peters
- Born: Tilburg, Netherlands
- Citizenship: Australian
- Education: University of Western Australia

Nonja Yvonne Huberta Maria Peters is a Western Australian author and academic of Dutch ancestry.

Her books produced on migration and Dutch Australians have received wide acclaim.

She has served on a number of Australian and Western Australian bodies, as well as being head of the Curtin University Migration, Ethnicity, Refugees & Citizenship Research Unit.

== Works ==
- Peters, Nonja (1990), Northam Migrant Camps photographic exhibition, Northam and District Heritage Development Association
- Peters, Nonja Ivonne; University of Western Australia. Department of Anthropology (1999), Trading places : Greek, Italian, Dutch and Vietnamese enterprise in Western Australia
- Peters, Nonja; University of Western Australia Press; Peters, Nonja (2001), Milk and honey but no gold : postwar migration to Western Australia, 1945–1964, University of Western Australia Press, ISBN 978-1-876268-56-5
- Peters, Nonja; Peters, Nonja (2006), The Dutch down under, 1606–2006, University of Western Australia Press, ISBN 978-1-920694-75-3
- Peters, Nonja (2008), From tyranny to freedom : Dutch children from the Netherlands East Indies to Fairbridge Farm School 1945–1946, Black Swan, ISBN 978-0-9757519-7-8
- Depok – De droom van Cornelis Chastelein, 2019, LM Publishers Volendam, ISBN 9789460225246
