= Belarusian Australians =

Total population
- 1,664 (by ancestry, 2011)

Regions with significant populations
- New South Wales, Victoria

Languages
- Belarusian, Russian, Polish, Australian English

Religion
- Eastern Orthodoxy and Roman Catholicism

Related ethnic groups
- Russian Australians, Ukrainian Australians, Polish Australians, Lithuanian Australians, Latvian Australians, Belarusian Americans, Belarusian Canadians

Belarusian Australians refers to Australians of full or partial Belarusian national background or descent, or Belarusian citizens living in Australia.

== History ==
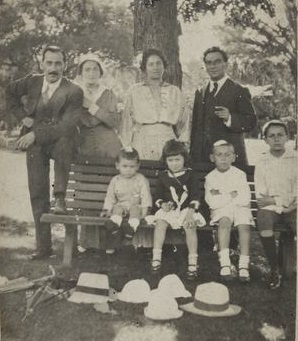
A migrant family from Minsk in Melbourne, c.1915-1916. They were likely recorded as Russians rather than Belarusians.

It is believed that the first Belarusian immigrants who arrived in Australia likely settled in the early 1800s in New South Wales, together with other European people. It is known that mass emigration from Belarus did not begin until slowly during the final decades of the 19th century, extending until World War I. They emigrated to Australia from Libava and northern Germany. When they arrived, most settled in Sydney and Melbourne. However, most of these first Belarusians were registered as Russians, except those who were Roman Catholics, registered as Poles.

Most Belarusians that immigrated to Australia after World War I were political immigrants, mainly from western Europe and Poland. These immigrants numbered thousands of people, among whom were counted some Jews between the late 1930s and the end of 1941.

After of the post-World War II period, from 1948 to the early 1950s, about 3,000 Belarusians immigrated to Australia, most of them having left Europe for political reasons. Not all of them came from Belarus; they also came from many countries where they had settled after World War II. In fact, the majority of them from West Germany and Austria, but many Belarusians also came from Great Britain, France, Italy, Belgium, Denmark, and other countries in South America and North Africa. These immigrants were former prisoners of war of the Polish and Soviet armies, persons who had worked in Germany as Ostarbeiters during the World War II, former émigrés who left Belarus shortly after the war or in 1939 when the Soviets attacked Poland, refugees who had fled Belarus in 1943 or 1944, and defectors and dissidents after World War II. During the 1980s and 1990s the waves of Belarusians who emigrated to Australia are relatively smaller compared with previous waves. People have emigrated for political, economic, and family reasons (to reunite with families that had already settled in Australia). However, most of these immigrants are of Jewish descent. The 1981 census counted 7,328 Belarusian who live in Australia but the 1990 census registered only 4,277 Belarusian living in the country.

== Demography ==
The total estimate of Belarusian immigrants to the Australia is 4,000 (this estimate includes only actual immigrants, and not people of Belarusian descent born in Australia). A precise number of Belarusian Australians is difficult to determine, since historically census and immigration statistics did not recognise Belarusians as a separate category. Many of them were recorded as Russian or Polish, depending on the region of Belarus in which they were born.

There were several waves of influx of Belarusians into Australia, one before the Russian Revolution, then in 1919-1939 from West Belarus, then in the late 1940s-early 1950s (after the Second World War), and after the collapse of the USSR in the 1990s.

One major group of Belarusian immigrants to the Australia are Belarusian Jews who migrated starting in the mid-19th century, facing discrimination in the Russian Empire, of which Belarus was part of at the time.

According to the 2001 Census Bureau report around 2,500 people who were born in Belarus live in Australia. Of them, about 90 speak the Belarusian language at home.
