= Demographics of Oceania =

Oceania
- Geopolitical Oceania
- Area: 8,525,989 km^{2} (3,291,903 sq mi)
- Population: 44,491,724 (2021, 6th)
- Population density: 4.19/km^{2} (10.9/sq mi)
- Demonym: Oceanian
- Countries: 14 (list of countries): Australia; Fiji; Kiribati; Marshall Islands; Federated States of Micronesia; Nauru; New Zealand; Palau; Papua New Guinea; Samoa; Solomon Islands; Tonga; Tuvalu; Vanuatu; Associated (2) (list): Cook Islands; Niue
- Dependencies: External (21) (list): American Samoa; Ashmore and Cartier Islands; Baker Island; Clipperton Island; Christmas Island; Cocos (Keeling) Islands; Coral Sea Islands; French Polynesia; Guam; Howland Island; Jarvis Island; Johnston Atoll; Kingman Reef; Midway Atoll; New Caledonia; Norfolk Island; Northern Mariana Islands; Pitcairn Islands; Tokelau; Wake Island; Wallis and Futuna; Internal (4) (list): Easter Island; Hawaii, United States; Juan Fernández Islands; Palmyra Atoll
- Languages: 29: (official and unofficial); Bislama; Carolinian; Chamorro; Cook Islands Māori; Cocos Malay (unofficial); English; Fijian; French; Futunan (unofficial); Gilbertese; Hawaiian; Hindi; Hiri Motu; Indonesian; Māori; Marshallese; Nauruan; Niuean; Palauan; Pitkern (unofficial); Rapa Nui (unofficial); Rotuman (unofficial); Samoan; Spanish; Tahitian (unofficial); Tokelauan; Tongan; Tok Pisin; Tuvaluan; Wallisian (unofficial)
- Time zones: UTC+14 (Kiribati) to UTC-11 (American Samoa and Niue) (West to East)
- Largest cities: List of cities in Oceania: Sydney, Australia; Melbourne, Australia; Brisbane, Australia; Perth, Australia; Auckland, New Zealand; Adelaide, Australia; Wellington, New Zealand; Honolulu, Hawaii, United States; Canberra, Australia; Christchurch, New Zealand; Jayapura, Indonesia; Port Moresby, Papua New Guinea; Nouméa, New Caledonia; Gold Coast, Australia

Oceania is a region centered on the islands of the tropical Pacific Ocean. Conceptions of what constitutes Oceania vary, with it being defined in various ways, often geopolitically or geographically. In the geopolitical conception used by the United Nations, International Olympic Committee, and many atlases, the Oceanic region includes Australia and the nations of the Pacific from Papua New Guinea east, but not the Malay Archipelago or Indonesian New Guinea. The term is sometimes used more specifically to denote Australasia as a geographic continent, or biogeographically as a synonym for either the Australasian realm (Wallacea and Australasia) or the Oceanian realm (Melanesia, Polynesia, and Micronesia apart either from New Zealand or from mainland New Guinea).

Although Christmas Island and the Cocos (Keeling) Islands belong to the Commonwealth of Australia and are inhabited, they are nearer Indonesia than the Australian mainland, and are commonly associated with Asia instead of Oceania.

== Demographics by territory ==
The demographic table below shows all inhabited states and territories of Oceania. The information in this chart comes from the CIA World Factbook or the United States Department of State, unless noted otherwise or not available (NA); where sources differ, references are included.

Pos	Country	Population (mid-2021 estimate)	Area (km^{2})	Population density (/km^{2})	Urban population	Life expectancy	Literacy Rate	Official language(s)	Top religion(s)	Ethnic groups
1	Australia	25,921,089	7,682,300	2.768	89%	81.63	99%	English 78.5%	Christian 64.6%, none 18.7%	European 57.2%, Oceanian 33.8% (including Australian Aborigines 2.9%), Asian, 17.4%.
2	Papua New Guinea	9,949,437	462,840	12.835	12%	65.75	57.3%	Tok Pisin 75%, English 1–2%, Hiri Motu <2%	Christian 96%	New Guinea Papuan 84%, New Guinea Melanesian 15%, other 1%
3	New Zealand	5,129,727	270,534	15.574	87%	80.36	99%	English 91.2%, Māori 3.9%	Christian 55.6%, None 34.7%	European 74.0%, Asian 12%, Māori 15%, Pacific Islander 7%, other 1%
–	Hawaii (United States)	1,419,561	28,311	82.647	92%	80.37	99%	English 73.44%, Hawaiian 1.68%	Christian 63%, None 26%, Buddhist 8%, Other 3%	Asian 37.2%, Multiracial 25.3%, White 22.9%, Pacific Islander 10.8%, Black 1.6%, Native American 0.3%
4	Fiji	924,610	18,274	51.697	18%	70.73	93.7%	English, Fijian, Hindi	Christian 64.5%, Hindu 27.9%, Muslim 6.3%	Fijian 57.3%, Indo-Fijians 37.6%, Rotuman 1.2%, other 3.9%
5	Solomon Islands	707,851	28,896	20.612	52%	73.69	76.6%	English 1–2%	Christian 95%	Melanesian 94.5%, Polynesian 3%, Micronesian 1.2%, other 1.3%
–	French Polynesia (France)	304,032	4,167	68.882	52%	76.71	98%	French 61.1%, Polynesian 31.4%	Protestant 54%, Roman Catholic 30%, other 10%, no religion 6%	Polynesian 78%, Chinese 12%, local French 6%, metropolitan French 4%
–	New Caledonia (France)	287,800	18,575	12.244	65%	74.98	96.8%	French	Roman Catholic 60%, Protestant 30%, other 10%	Melanesian 44.1%, European 34.1%, Wallisian & Futunian 9%, Tahitian 2.6%, Indonesian 2.5%, Vietnamese 1.4%, Ni-Vanuatu 1.1%, other 5.2%
6	Vanuatu	319,137	12,189	18.176	25%	64.33	74%	English 23.1%, French 1.9%	Christian 82%, indigenous beliefs 5.6%, other 10.9%, none 1%	Ni-Vanuatu 98.5%, other 1.5%
7	Samoa	218,764	2,831	67.821	23%	72.13	99.7%	Samoan	Christian 98.9%	Samoan 92.6%, Euronesians 7%, Europeans 0.4%
–	Guam (United States)	170,534	1,478	122.371	93%	78.18	99%	English 38.3%, Chamorro 22.2%	Roman Catholic 85%	Chamorro 37.1%, Filipino 26.3%, other Pacific islander 11.3%, white 6.9%, other 8.6%, mixed 9.8%
8	Tonga	106,017	747	164.096	25%	71.03	98.9%	Tongan, English	Christian	Tongan 98%
9	Federated States of Micronesia	113,131	702	152.641	22%	71.23	89%	English	Roman Catholic 50%, Protestant 47%, others 3%	Chuukese 48.8%, Pohnpeian 24.2%, Kosraean 6.2%, Yapese 5.2%, Yap outer islands 4.5%, Asian 1.8%, Polynesian 1.5%, other 7.8%
10	Kiribati	128,874	811	122.666	44%	64.03	92%	English, Gilbertese (de facto)	Roman Catholic 55%, Protestant 36%	Micronesian 98.8%
–	American Samoa (United States)	45,035	199	333.829	92%	73.97	97%	English, Samoan	Christian Congregationalist 50%, Roman Catholic 20%, Protestant and other 30%	native Pacific islander 91.6%, Asian 2.8%, white 1.1%, mixed 4.2%, other 0.3%
11	Marshall Islands	42,050	181	363.862	71%	71.48	93.7%	Marshallese 98.2%, English	Protestant 54.8%, other Christian 40.6%	Marshallese 92.1%, mixed Marshallese 5.9%, other 2%
–	Northern Mariana Islands (United States)	49,481	464	104.131	91%	76.9	97%	English	Christian	Filipino 35.3%, Chamorro 23.9%, Multiracial 12.7%, Chinese 6.8%, Carolinian 4.6%, Korean 4.2%, 2.3% Chuukese, 2.2% Palauan, 2.1% White, 5.9% other
12	Palau	18,024	459	45.488	81%	71.51	92%	Paluan 64.7%, English	Roman Catholic 41.6%, Protestant 23.3%	Palauan 69.9%, Filipino 15.3%, Chinese 4.9%, other Asian 2.4%, white 1.9%, Carolinian 1.4%, other Micronesian 1.1%, other 3.2%
–	Wallis and Futuna (France)	11,627	142	108.049	0%	78.83	50%	Wallisian 58.9%, Futunian 30.1%, French 10.8%	Roman Catholic 99%	Polynesian
–	Cook Islands (New Zealand)	17,003	236	48.678	74%	74.47	95%	Māori, English	Cook Islands Christian Church 55.9%, other Christian 30.5%	Cook Island Māori 87.7%, part Cook Island Māori 5.8%, other 6.5%
13	Tuvalu	11,204	26	401.615	49%	64.39	93%	Tuvalu, English	Church of Tuvalu (Congregationalist) 97%	Polynesian 96%, Micronesian 4%
14	Nauru	12,511	21	441.286	100%	64.99	99%	Nauruan	Nauru Congregational Church 35.4%, Roman Catholic 33.2%, Nauru Independent Church (Protestant) 10.4%	Nauruan 58%, other Pacific Islander 26%, Chinese 8%, European 8%
–	Norfolk Island (Australia)	2,155	36	59.861	NA	NA	NA	English, Norfuk	Anglican 31.8%, other Christian 30,9%, none 19.9%	European, Tahitian, Australian, New Zealander, Polynesian
–	Tokelau (New Zealand)	1,849	12	116.667	0%	69	NA	Tokelauan, English	Congregational Christian Church 70%, Roman Catholic 28%	Polynesian
–	Niue (New Zealand)	1,937	260	5.208	39%	69.5	NA	Niuean, English	Ekalesia Niue (Protestant) 61.1%, other Christian 11%, Latter Day Saints 8.8%	Niuean 78.2%, Pacific islander 10.2%, European 4.5%, mixed 3.9%, Asian 0.2%, unspecified 3%
–	Pitcairn Islands (United Kingdom)	48	47	1.021	NA	NA	NA	English, Pitkern	Seventh-day Adventist 100%	European, Tahitian
–	Total	44,491,724	8,506,427	4.073	71%	77.87	91%		73.3%	
–	Total minus mainland Australia	18,570,635	824,127	16.242	43%	71.89	78%			

== See also ==
- Europeans in Oceania
- Indigenous peoples of Oceania
- Y-DNA haplogroups in populations of Oceania

== Notes ==
a: Papua New Guinea has over 860 non-official languages, comprising approximately ten percent of all languages on Earth.

b: Melanesian pidgin is lingua franca in much of the country, but English remains the official language.

c: Samoan and English were declared the official languages of American Samoa in June, 2010, via a constitutional amendment to the 1967 Revised Constitution of American Samoa.

d: Palaun is the official language in all islands except Sonsoral (Sonsoralese and English are official), Tobi (Tobi and English are official), and Angaur (Angaur, Japanese, and English are official).

e: Based on a 1969 estimate.

f: English, while not an official language, is widely understood, spoken, and used for most government and commercial purposes.

g: Norfuk was made the second official language of Norfolk Island in 2005.

h: While no valid literacy data is available, Norfolk Island is assumed to have an adult literacy rate roughly at a par with Australia's literacy rate of 99%.

i: On Atafu, all Congregational Christian Church of Samoa; on Nukunonu, all Roman Catholic; on Fakaofo, both denominations, with the Congregational Christian Church predominant.

j: While no valid literacy data is available, Niue is assumed to have an adult literacy rate of almost 100%.

k: The Foreign and Commonwealth Office does not hold any statistical information on the literacy rate of the Pitcairn population.

l: The residents of the Pitcairn Islands are descendants of HMS Bounty mutineers and their Tahitian wives.

m: Much of the information on these two websites is taken from the censuses of other countries, and are not based on independent US government research. The remaining figures are based on estimates, and have been used only where census information from the nation in question is incomplete, unclear, or nonexistent.
