= First white child in Australia =

Claims have appeared in books, newspapers and modern media of the first children born to European parents in Australia. While there are a number of claims, contemporaneous sources list Rebecca Small (born September 1789) as the first white European child born on the Australian mainland, while Seebaer van Nieuwelant was born much earlier at sea aboard a Dutch exploration vessel in 1623. Recent research has discovered possibly earlier births than Small, including William Nash (baptised 25 May 1788) and Mary Ann Turner (born 25 May 1788, baptised 15 June 1788)

== Birth at sea ==
- Early in the European maritime exploration of Australia on 27 July 1623, Seebaer van Nieuwelant, son of Willemtgen and Willem Janszoon, was born around seven miles south of Dirk Hartog Island, in present-day Western Australia. His father, not to be confused with the earlier Dutch explorer of the same name, was a midshipman from Amsterdam. He and his wife were aboard the Leijden, commanded by Claes Hermanszoon, which was charting the coast at the time. Their son's name in Dutch meant "sea-born (or sea-birth) of new land". (Note: From the journal of the Leijden (or Leyden): "On the 27th do. Willemtgen Jansz, wedded wife of Willem Jansz of Amsterdam, midshipman, was delivered of a son, who got the name of Seebaer van Nieuwelant.")
- A number of children were born on the First Fleet's 250-day journey from Portsmouth to Australia, with one source claiming that there were twenty births in total between the wives of marines and convicts. While some of these births would have been further from Australia, one child, Frances Hannah Dalton, was born very close to their arrival in late January 1788.

== Births on Australia ==
=== New South Wales ===
- Examples such as William Nash (baptised 25 May 1788) and Mary Ann Turner (born 25 May 1788, baptised 15 June 1788) are contenders for the earliest European births on the Australian continent.
- Commonly cited as the first white child or the first white female born in Australia, Rebecca Small (22 September 1789 – 30 January 1883), was born in Port Jackson, the eldest daughter of John Small a boatswain in the First Fleet which arrived at Botany Bay in January 1788. Later articles put her as the second white female, then with historical evidence of convict women having given birth earlier, the claim (originating with a notable descendant) was qualified with the expression "free born", but even so, genealogists in the 1930s suggested that she may have been the twentieth white child born on the Australian mainland, with her status as the 'oldest native-born white Australian' upon her death in 1883 bolstering her claim. Small married Francis Oakes on 27 January 1806; George Oakes and Francis Oakes were two of their sons.
- Elizabeth Baker, born in Sydney Cove, of Susannah Huffnell, convict First Fleet and William Baker, sergeant of Marines First Fleet, baptised in Sydney Cove on 1 January 1789, hence born in 1788.

=== Victoria ===
- William James Hobart Thorne (25 November 1803 – 2 July 1872) was born at Port Phillip, in what was still part of New South Wales but became Victoria, during the short-lived settlement led by Lieutenant-Governor David Collins. Thorne married Elizabeth Norman (c. 1812 – 9 January 1876) on 1 January 1830.

Other names have been proposed:

- A child, name not yet found, born at Port Phillip on 30 December 1835 to James and Mary Gilbert.
- A child, name not yet found, born in 1836 to Sara Honey (c. 1808 – 10 April 1904)
- John Wood Fleming (3 June 1837 – )
- Richmond Henty (3 August 1837 – 1904) has been claimed as the first or second

the congregation of these dates can have nothing to do with the declaration of the Colony of Victoria, which occurred much later, on 1 July 1851.

=== South Australia ===
- A girl child was born at sea sometime between May and July 1836 aboard Duke of York to T. Hudson Beare and Lucy Ann Beare née Loose (c. 1803 – 3 September 1837), but died before touching land at Kangaroo Island. Mrs Beare died following a later childbirth.
- John Rapid Light Hoare (7 November 1836 – )
- Fanny Lipson Finniss (1 January 1837 – 30 May 1865), daughter of B. T. Finniss. She married Frederick George Morgan on 15 December 1853.
- Also noteworthy, Henry Wilkins (1 January 1837 – ), father of Hubert Wilkins, was born to William Wilkins and Mary Wilkins, née Chivers, passengers aboard Emma, arr. October 1836.
- Elizabeth Ann Hobbs, daughter of Frederick and Mary, born 16 April 1837, acknowledged the priority of Fanny Finniss.

=== Queensland ===
- Amity Moreton Thompson (later Wright) (21 September 1824 - October 1900). Amity was the daughter of one of the detachment of guards sent to establish the colony of Moreton Bay. The "Amity" was the ship on which her parents, Robert and Mary, sailed and the place they landed was Moreton Bay. In 1899, she attempted to claim a land grant of 500 acres (200 ha) that she claimed was given to her at her birth.
- Sarah McCann (later Graham) (1831– )
- Jimmy Hexton (25 September 1832 – 12 February 1914)

=== Western Australia ===
- Sophia Roe (25 December 1829 – 6 October 1901) was a daughter of Capt. John Septimus Roe. She married Samuel Pole Phillips on 29 April 1847.

=== Tasmania ===
- Son, name not yet found, born c. April 1803 to Mrs and Dr Matthew Bowden (1779 – 23 October 1814) aboard Lady Nelson while in Derwent River.
- Jane, surname not yet found, (c. May 1803 – May 1873) was born shortly after her parents arrived by Lady Nelson. She married William Bradshaw.
- (William) Dalrymple Keating (2 December 1804 – 11 August 1884)
- First white male child born in Sullivan Cove, River Derwent - George Kearly Jnr born 9 July 1804 per gravestone but possibly 14 July 1804 per birth record and died 15th July 1804, son of George Kearly, a colonial marine & Mary Kearly nee Cook. Gravestone in Saint David's Burial Ground, 20 Sandy Bay Road, Hobart, Tasmania.

=== Northern Territory ===
- Elizabeth Melville Richardson, born c. 27 March 1827 to John and Jane Richardson on Fort Dundas, Melville Island.

== See also ==
- First white child
- Currency lads and lasses
