= Montenegrin Australians =

Montenegrin Australians Crnogorski Australijanci Црногорски Аустралијанци
Total population
- 2,720 (Montenegrin ancestry in 2021); 1,496 (Montenegrin-born in 2021)

Regions with significant populations
- Sydney

Languages
- English (Australian English dialects), Montenegrin

Religion
- Montenegrin Orthodox, Roman Catholic and Muslim minority

Related ethnic groups
- Montenegrins, Montenegrin Americans, Montenegrin Canadians

Montenegrin Australians (Montenegrin: Crnogorski Australijanci) are Australian citizens of Montenegrin descent.

There are claims that the first Montenegrin emigrants to Australia arrived in the mid-19th century. However, there is no more reliable data on this, primarily because many traveled on the way through parts of today's Montenegro, which were under Austrian rule. It was only in 1884, at least according to available archival data, that 36 Montenegrins migrated "to Asian countries and Australia". Along with this, there are also data that Montenegrins, as well as many other emigrants at that time, worked in mines and deforestation in wetlands. Most were in the mining center of Broken Hill, but also in northern Queensland, where they worked on forest logging and reeds and road construction.

Most Montenegrins living in Australia are concentrated in New South Wales (primarily in Sydney) and Victoria.

== Notable Montenegrin Australians ==
- Matt Jaukovic
- Aleksandar Vukic
- Holly Valance
- Olympia Valance

== See also ==
- European Australians
- Europeans in Oceania
- Immigration to Australia
