= Belgian Australians =

Belgische Australiërs (Dutch) Australiens belges (French)
- (Belgium) (Australia)

Total population
- 6,378

Regions with significant populations
- Predominantly New South Wales and Queensland

Languages
- English · Walloon French · Dutch

Religion
- Predominantly Christianity and Atheism, followed by Judaism

Related ethnic groups
- French Australians · Dutch Australians

Belgian Australians (Dutch: Belgische Australiërs, French: Australiens belges) are Australian citizens of Belgian ancestry or Belgian-born people who reside in Australia.

== Belgian Australians ==
This is a list of notable Belgian Australians and their descendants.

- Wim Broeckx, Freelance Ballet Teacher, Coach and Artistic Advisor. Previous Principal Dancer and Assistent Artistic Director Dutch National Ballet 1982-1999, Director Dance Department Royal Conservatoire The Hague (2000-2011), Artistic Director Prix de Lausanne International Ballet Competition (2008-2012), Head of Pre- Professional Program Queensland Ballet (2019-2020)
- Ted Baillieu, Liberal Party of Australia Premier of Victoria (2010–2013) and Member of the Legislative Assembly for the Electoral district of Hawthorn since 1999
- William Baillieu, philanthropist, businessman and parliamentarian
- Mathias Cormann, Secretary General, OECD. Former Liberal Senator for Western Australia and Australian Minister for Finance between 2013 and 2020.
- Wouter De Backer (Gotye), ARIA Award-winning singer-songwriter.
- Chantale Delrue, visual artist, member of Tasmanian Honour Roll of Women
- Nicolas Hyeronimus (1808–1860), pioneering innkeeper, merchant, pastoralist and politician in colonial New South Wales; member of the New South Wales Legislative Assembly as inaugural member for the electoral district of Wellington
- Karel Axel Lodewycks, author and Chief Librarian of the Melbourne University Library
- Pierre Ryckmans, Professor of Chinese Studies at the University of Sydney
- Bradley Wiggins, born in Belgium to an Australian father

== See also ==
- Australia–Belgium relations
- Belgians
- French Australians
- Dutch Australians
- German Australians
- European Australians
