= Ukrainian Australians =

Total population
- 14,055 (by birth, 2021 census); 53,359 (by ancestry, 2021 census)

Regions with significant populations
- Sydney, Melbourne, Brisbane, Adelaide, Perth

Languages
- Ukrainian, Russian, Australian English

Religion
- Irreligion, Eastern Orthodoxy, Judaism, Catholicism

Ukrainian Australians refers to Australian citizens of Ukrainian descent, or Ukraine-born people who immigrated to Australia. They are an ethnic minority in Australia, numbering about 38,000 people according to the 2011 Census. Currently, the main concentrations of Ukrainians are located in the cities of Sydney and Melbourne.

== History ==
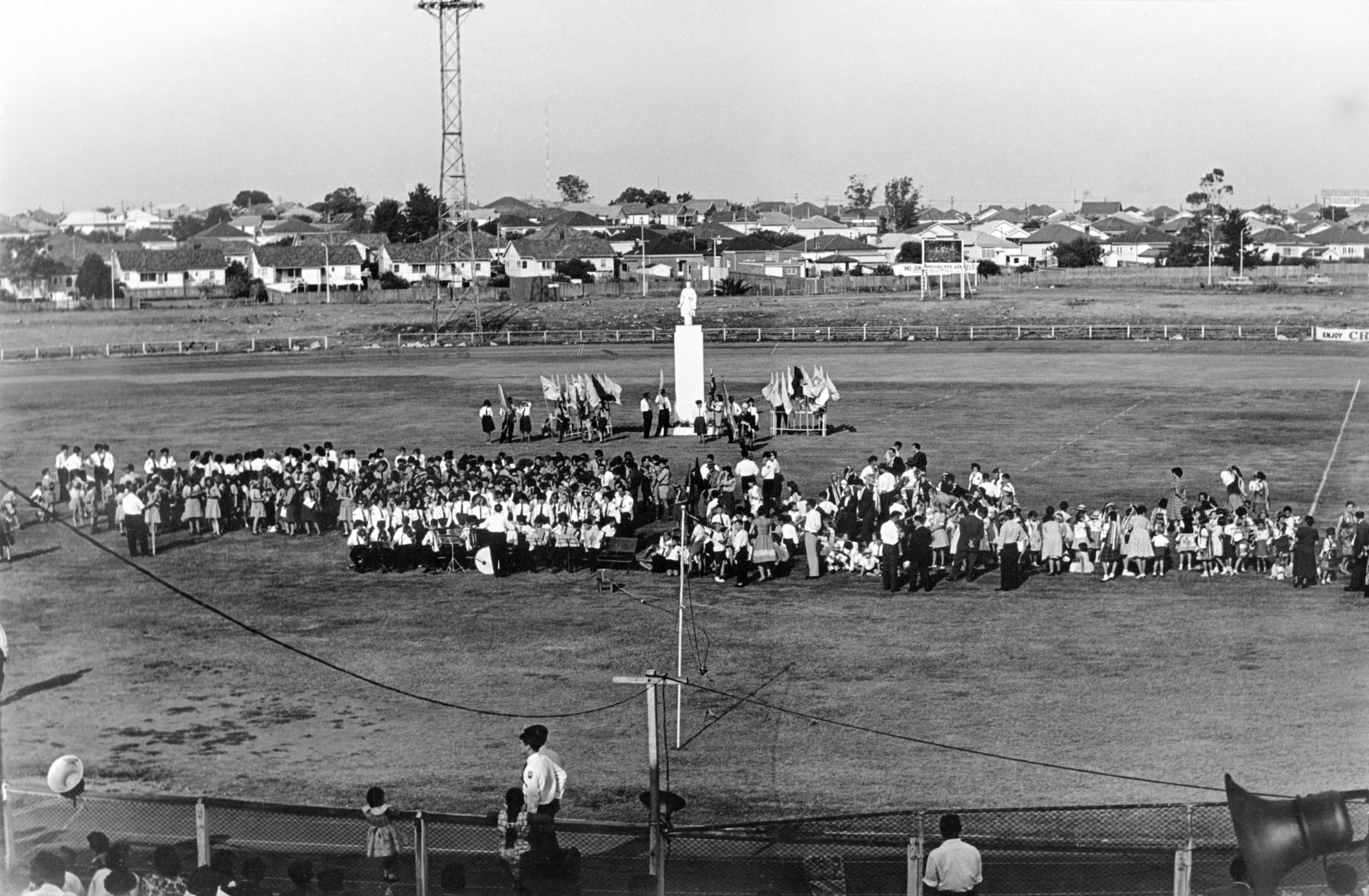
The Ukrainian Australian community in February 1964 commemorating 150 years from the birth of the poet Taras Shevchenko at Lidcombe Oval.

One of the first Ukrainian migrants to Australia was Mykhailo Hryb, who in the 19th century established a sheep farm. A notable Ukrainian who visited Australia was Nicholas Miklouho-Maclay, an ethnographer and naturalist who came to Australia in 1878, and besides scientific and ethnographic studies, was responsible for the building of Australia's first biological field station at Watsons Bay in NSW.

Prior to World War I, up to 5,000 Ukrainians migrated to Australia, with some settling in communities in Brisbane. However, the main body of Ukrainians immigrated to Australia along with other nationalities in the post-World War II wave of refugees from Europe. These refugees were called "displaced persons" and started arriving in 1948 as part of the International Refugee Organization resettlement agreement or on assisted passages which included 2-year work contracts with the Australian government. Many arrived by way of refugee camps in Germany. The 1947 Australian Census did not list Ukraine as a birthplace, though the 1954 Census recorded 14,757 as Ukraine-born.

The number of migrants from Soviet Ukraine was minimal, though there was a limited migration of Ukrainians from communities in Poland and Yugoslavia. In 1991, Ukraine gained independence, and over the next five years the Ukraine-born population increased for the first time in many decades, in Victoria from 2,937 in 1991 to 5,370 in 1996. Many of these new post-independence migrants were young professionals in the fields of science, mathematics and computer technology.

At the time of the 2011 Census, there was an active Ukrainian community of about 38,000 people, most living in Melbourne and Sydney. There are active Ukrainian communities and centres in Geelong, Brisbane, Perth, Adelaide and Canberra, with smaller centres in Queanbeyan, Hobart, Newcastle, Moe, Albury-Wodonga, Northam and Noble Park.

In March 2022, the Australian government granted temporary visas to approximately 5,000 Ukrainians fleeing the Russian invasion of their country, In total, Australia has granted 8,500 visas to Ukrainian refugees since the war started.

== Organisations ==
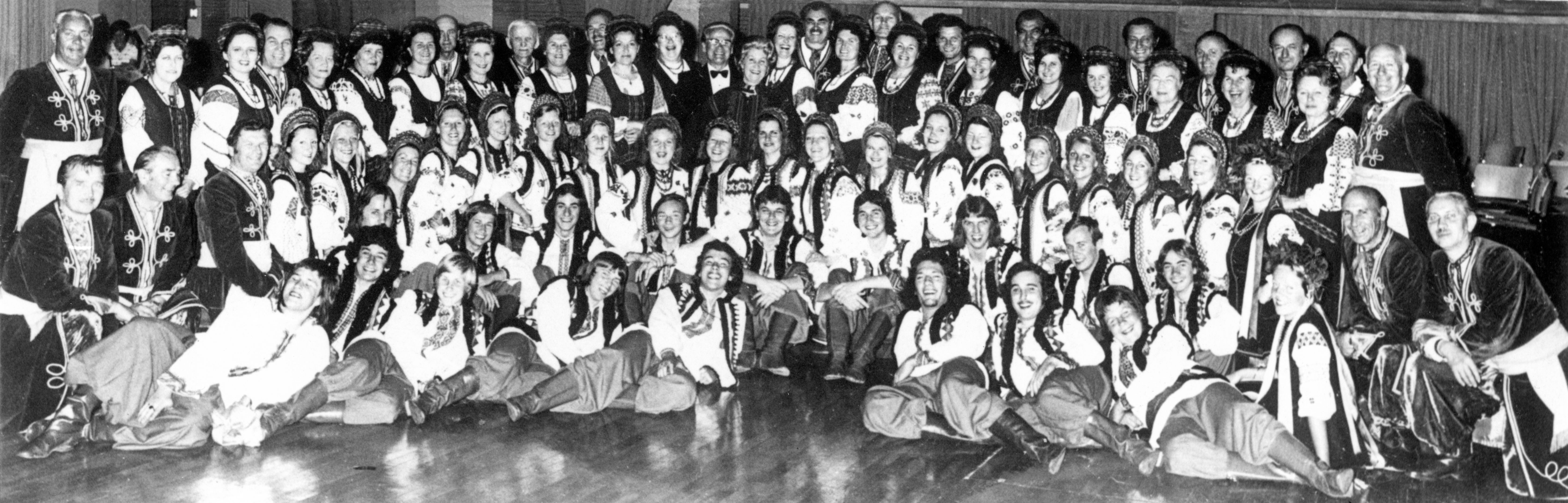
Ukrainian choir "Boyan" — director Vasyl Matiash (top row — centre), with the "Ukrainian Folk Ballet" — musical director and choreographer — Natalia Tyrawsky (top row — centre). Photo early 1970s, Sydney

The Australian Federation of Ukrainian Organisations is the umbrella organisation and participant in the Ukrainian World Congress that represents the Ukrainian community in Australia. Each state has a number of Ukrainian community associations, or hromadas. The Ukrainian Council of NSW represents the Ukrainian hromadas in New South Wales.

The Ukrainian community in Australia was very active in the formation of a variety of cultural organisations, including choirs, folk dancing groups, and arts organisations like the "Ukrainian Artists Society of Australia".

As well, there are Australian versions of Ukrainian youth organisations such as Plast and the Ukrainian Youth Association.

In addition, an aged care facility exists, called Kalyna Care, catering to cultural and care requirements of elderly community members.

== Notable people ==
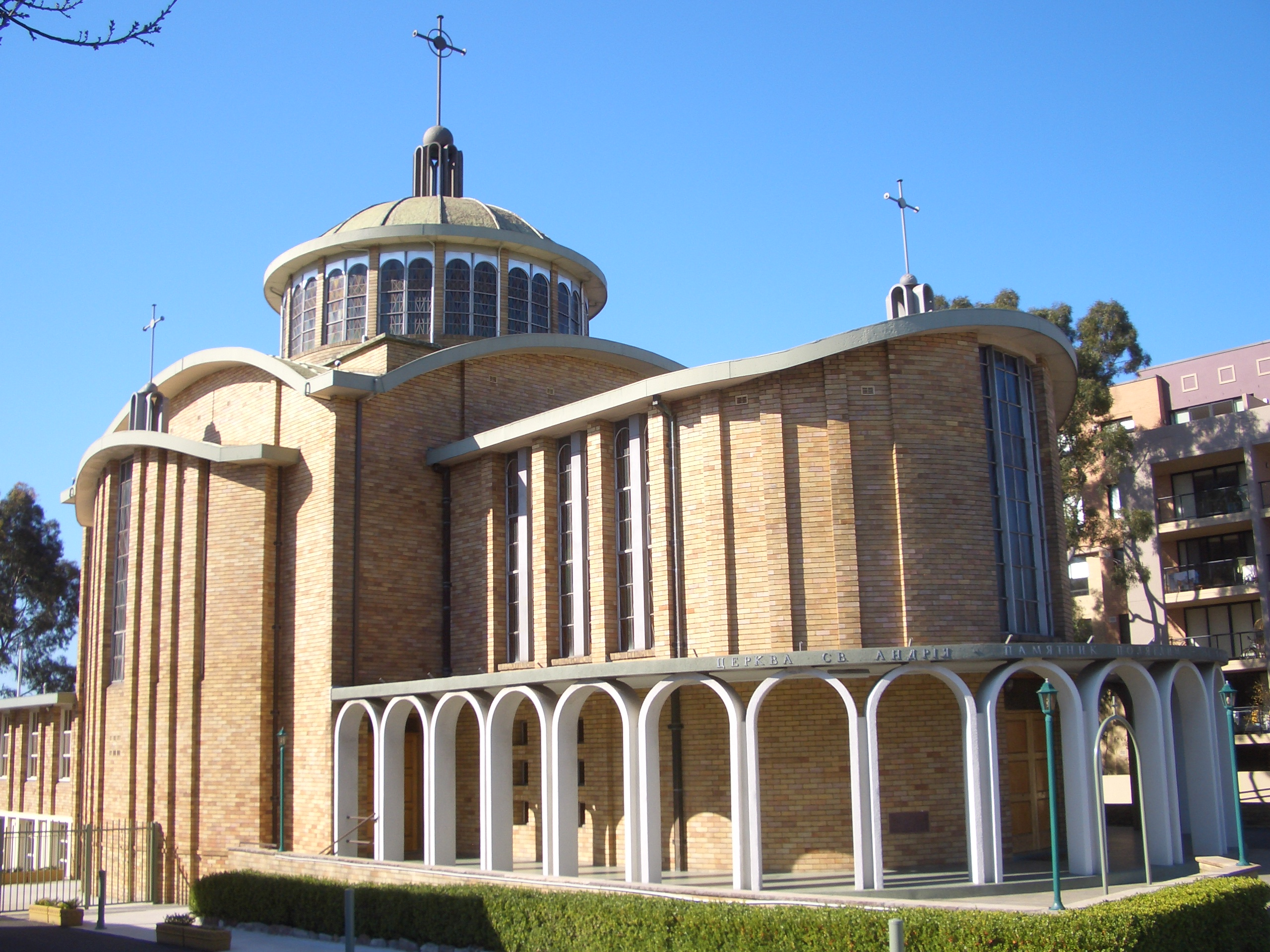
St Andrews Ukrainian Catholic Church, Lidcombe, NSW.

- Maurice Abraham Cohen, educator
- Rachael Finch, model
- Taras Gomulka, footballer
- Alex Jesaulenko, Australian rules footballer
- Michael Kmit, painter
- Harry Messel, educator
- Victor Mishalow, composer
- Dmytro Nytczenko, writer
- Bohdan Nyskohus, footballer
- Jared Petrenko, Australian rules footballer
- Nikita Rukavytsya, footballer
- Alex Ryvchin, author and advocate
- Elen Levon, singer
- Matthew Guy, Victorian Liberal MP
- Katia Tiutiunnik, Composer
- Andrew Rovenko, Photographer
- Hudson Young, Rugby league player

== See also ==
- Australia–Ukraine relations
- European Australians
- Ukrainian New Zealanders
- Ukrainian diaspora
- Belarusian Australians
- Polish Australians
- Russian Australians
