= Slovak Australians =

Total population
- c. 12,000

Regions with significant populations
- Sydney and Melbourne

Languages
- Australian English, Slovak

Religion
- Roman Catholic (Majority) Protestantism, Judaism

Related ethnic groups
- Slovaks · Czechs · Hungarians

Slovak Australians are Australian citizens of full or partial Slovak ancestry or a person born in Slovakia who resides in Australia. Approximately 12,000 residents in Australia report to have Slovak ancestry.

== Notable Slovak Australians ==
- Michael Dzian (born 1929), businessman
- Jarmila Gajdošová (born 1987), tennis player
- Renée Geyer (born 1953), singer
- Bohuslav 'Bob' SRŠEŇ (born 1923), Leading Aircraftman (LAC) - Served the Royal Australia Airforce during WW2. Otherwise known as 'The Hornet of Townsville'

== See also ==
- European Australians
- Europeans in Oceania
- Immigration to Australia
- Slovak Americans

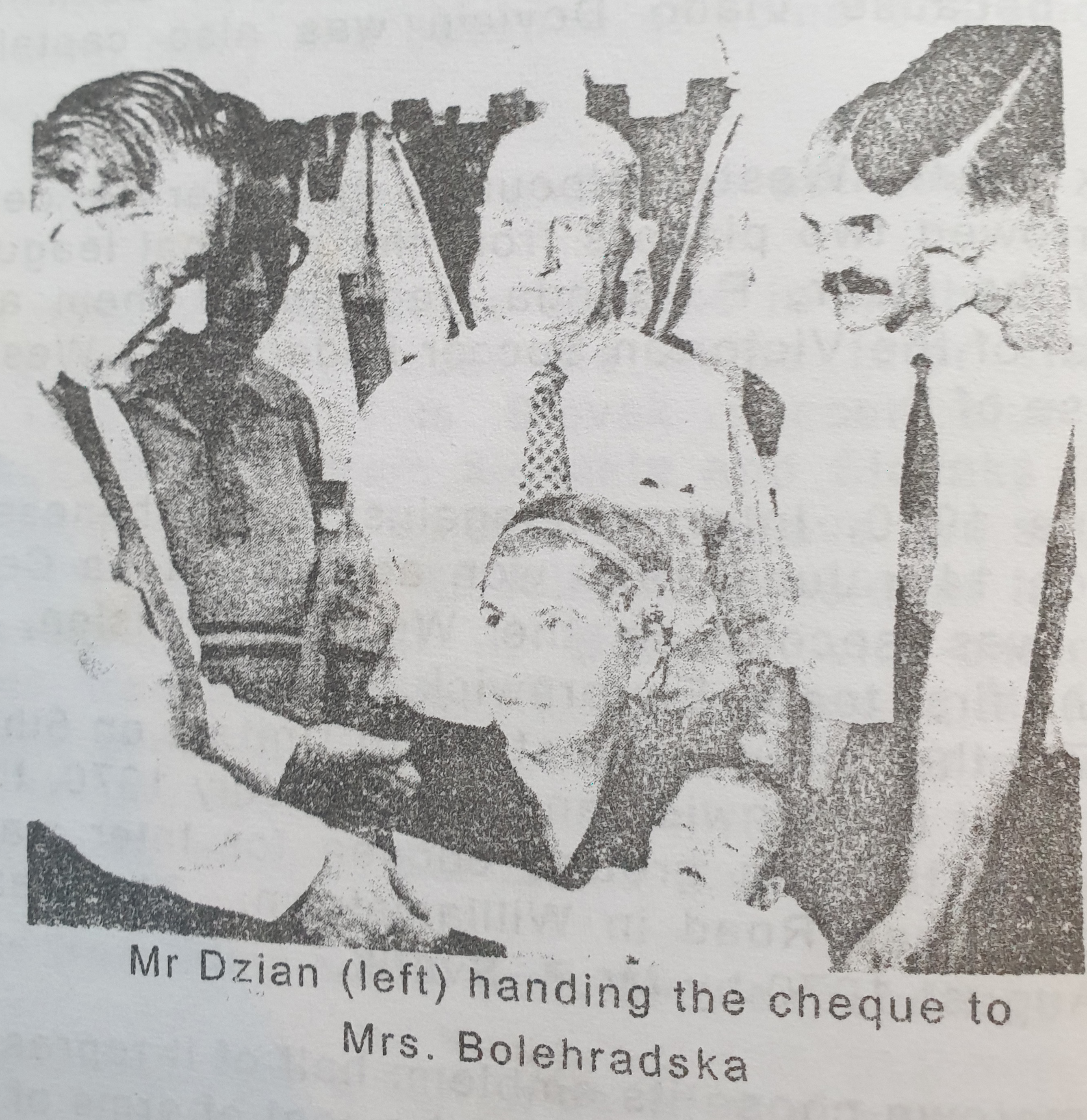
President of Inter Williamstown Slovak Football club Michael Dzian presents cheque donated to widow Mrs. Bolehradska after the death of her husband.

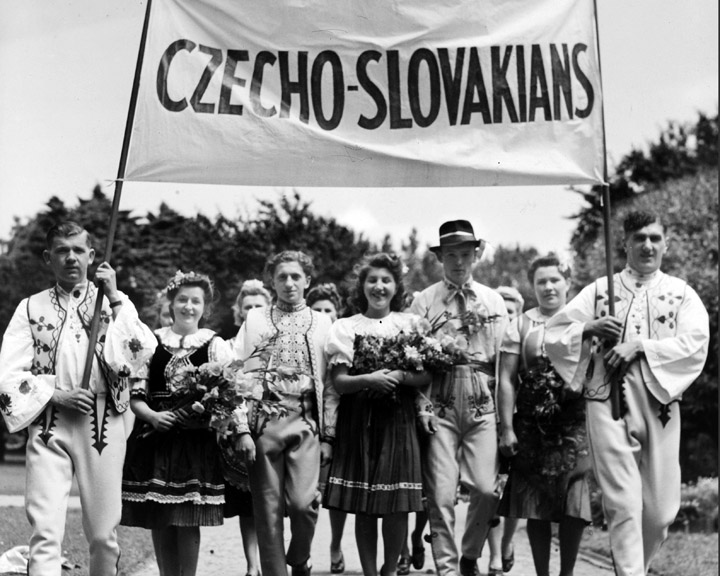
People in national dress during the Voices of Freedom Pageant, 1944.
