= Romani people in Australia =

Romani Australians
Romane manusha andi Australiya (Romani)
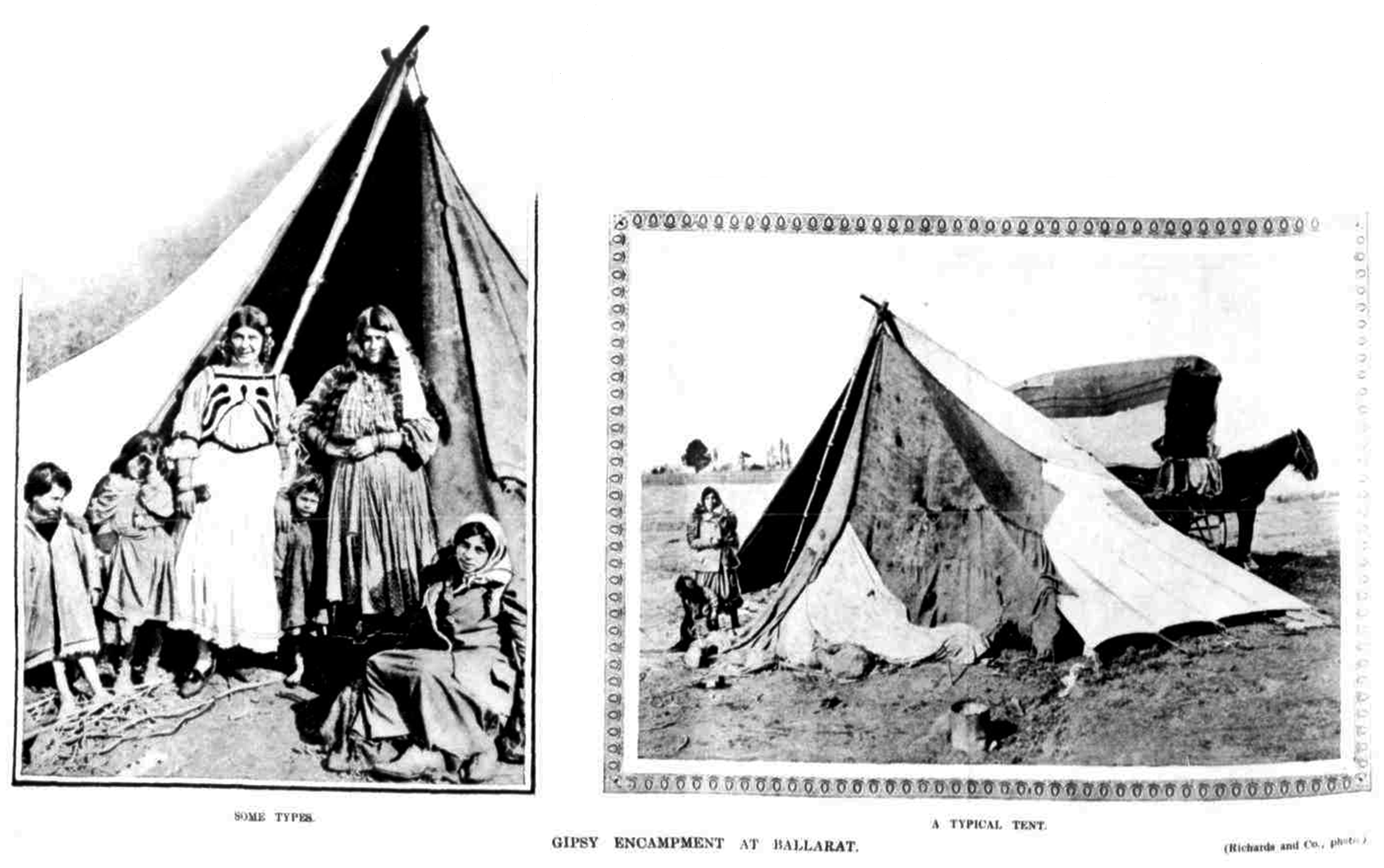
- Romani encampment in Ballarat, 1908

Total population
- 5,000-25,000

Regions with significant populations
- New South Wales, Queensland, Western Australia

Languages
- Australian English, Romani, various Para-Romani languages

Religion
- Christianity, Romani mythology

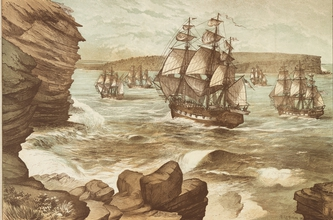
The First Fleet arriving at Port Jackson in 1788. Approximately 60 Romani people were on board.

The Romani people in Australia are citizens of Australia who are of Romani descent. They are sometimes referred to as Roma. Most Roma in Australia trace their roots to the United Kingdom and Greece, who in return trace their roots to northern India.

The first Roma arrived in Australia in 1788, with migration patterns continuing throughout the eighteenth and nineteenth centuries. The population is currently estimated to be between 5,000 and 25,000 peoples, with significant numbers of Roma living in New South Wales, Queensland and Western Australia.

The Romani community is underrepresented in Australian society, and is commonly referred to as the ‘invisible community’. Many members are not registered on the electoral roll, nor do they identify as Romani in the census. Reasons behind this include the nomadic lifestyle of many Roma, where they temporarily live in various states and regions, and fear of discrimination.

In Australia, the Romani community engages in many traditional practices, including marriage, fortune-telling, nomadism and poetry writing. These cultural practices are central to the diaspora as a whole; however, they slightly vary across populations due to contextual influences.

== Origins and History ==
The Roma population originated in the northwestern regions of India. Following a history of violence and brutality, communities have migrated internationally, with the majority of members living throughout Europe. It is estimated that the Romani diaspora has a population somewhere between 2-5 million peoples, however the nomadic nature of their culture challenges the accuracy of such statistics.

The arrival of the First Fleet in 1788 brought Romani people to Australia. It is estimated that within the convict population, approximately sixty people were of Romani descent. Notable names in this population include James Squire, who went on to establish the first brewery in Australia.

Signature of James Squire, founder of Australia's first brewery

Following the outbreak of World War II, the Australian Romani population further increased as members of the Romani community in Europe sought to escape extermination by the Nazi Regime. Other factors that increased patterns of Roma migration include the Greco-Turkish War (1919-1922) which saw the community become the target of persecution by these world powers.

== Geography and populations ==
According to the 2011 Census, the Australian Romani population measured to approximately 775 people. This figure is largely disputed among researchers and the Romani community due to the group's practice of nomadism and their desire to isolate from western culture, which makes accurate statistics challenging to acquire. The real population is estimated to be around 20,000-25,000 people.

Romani communities are dispersed across all Australian states, with significant populations located in New South Wales, Queensland and Western Australia. Around 14,000 Roma live in Western Australia, mostly immigrants from Macedonia and their children. Nearly all lead sedentary lives. Here, culture maintains a strong presence. The community continues to organise cultural events, Rom-exclusive sports competitions and teach the language of Romanes.

Historically, Romani communities across the world have held jobs that support their nomadic lifestyle. As well as this, the lower levels of education within the group also affects the job titles they can pursue. The typical occupational fields for this community include agriculture and livestock traders, repairmen and engineers, and entertainment, often seen through fortune-telling and music. In Australia, similar job titles are held by the Roma. In the early twentieth century, men often worked in the cane fields across Queensland and women worked as entertainers to the public.

== Culture and tradition within the Australian diaspora ==
The customs and traditions of the Romani diaspora differ in each established society due to factors such as the environment, population size and public attitudes, which influence the practice of culture. There are some cultural values that are fundamental to the ethnic group and therefore widely rehearsed. Marriage is a large institution within Romani culture and is highly valued. The family structure typically includes a mother and a father, their children, and their married son's immediate family.

Other aspects of tradition include the nomadic/traveller lifestyle, fortune-telling, as both a spiritual and occupational practice, and initiation practices that direct men and women into their gendered roles within the community.

=== Marriage and social organisation ===
Members of the Roma are deemed ready for marriage once they reach puberty. In the Australian context, the rate of Romani marriages is unknown. This is largely due to a number of factors, including the legal age required for marital recognition under the law. In Australia, individuals must be at least eighteen years of age in order to have their marriage legally registered. In traditional Romani culture, the participants can be as young as thirteen years old. Therefore, due to the laws preventing child marriage in Australia, this ritual holds symbolic value rather than legal, making it harder to generate statistics. Additionally, the community's desire to maintain a low-profile within Australia also challenges any estimations, as many Roma do not publicly acknowledge their heritage due to fear of discrimination and racism.

=== Religion ===
In Roma culture, there is no prescribed religion for members to follow. Rather, communities adopt the major religion of the country that they live. Rituals and traditions are adjusted accordingly, creating variation across the diaspora. This flexibility demonstrates the Romani desire to be accepted in the inhabited countries in order to avoid cultural conflict and discrimination.

The Romani people in Australia adhere to the Christian faith. The Pentecostal denomination is a popular branch among the community. This follows the spread of the Evangelical Pentecostal Movement throughout the nineteen hundreds, which saw a significant increase in members from the Romani diaspora. It is believed that the movement reached Australia after 1989.

As a result of these Christian influences, baptism has become a significant practice for many Romani communities, since children are considered lucky within the culture. Baptism is believed to remove impurity and offer strength, protection and health against evil spirits.

=== Western influences on Australian Romani culture ===
Western culture in Australia has influenced the nature and prevalence of Romani customs and traditions. The nomadic lifestyle is still practised in some Australian Romani populations, where caravans are used to travel between regions and states. In the twenty-first century, a noticeable trend shows the increasing number of Romani families opting to live in more permanent settlements. Reasons behind this may include better access to education, settling down as an easier lifestyle alternative to travelling, and so forth.

Culture is largely practised within the boundaries of the community, with the group using food, music, ornaments and clothing to express their beliefs and traditions. Fortune-telling remains a significant practice for the Australian Roma; throughout history they have used it as both an expression of culture and as a job position. Additionally, following the rise of technology in the twenty-first century, social media has become a means for Romani people to engage in culture, with online forums allowing members to find like-minded people and to discuss and share their traditions and practices.

Many scholars argue that Romani culture is slowly fading in the face of the wider Australian culture. For example, their nomadic lifestyle rivals the permanency needed to sustain contemporary jobs, so many Roma feel the need to reject such practice. Similarly, the use of the Romanes language is becoming less prevalent within the community, with English taking its place in order to suit the demands of Australian culture.

== Cultural differences and exclusion ==
Throughout history, the Romani community has been subject to repeated acts of discrimination by various groups and governments. It is for this reason that the group lives as a diaspora, as the threat of violence forced smaller family units to flee their origin nations. In the Second World War, historians estimate that the German forces killed around 250,000 Roma, or about 25% of the Roma population.

Within Australia, the group's lifestyle has become a point of contention. Historically, Romani practices have been largely opposed by government bodies. Throughout the 1900s, traditions such as child marriage and fortune-telling were disputed in national courts. For instance, Rosy Sterio's lawsuit against her husband in 1926 highlighted tensions between Western and Roma values. Rosy Sterio, an underaged girl, accused her husband of assault, however the case was eventually dismissed as it was considered a ‘tribal feud’. The court's opposition to child marriage ultimately prevented them from achieving justice for the Romani community.

Since the early twenty-first century, there has been a general push-back against this treatment within the community. The Romani Gypsy Association of Australia and other groups have been established to create a sense of community and a safe space for this population. Similarly, prominent figures such as Mandy Sayer have become advocates for change. Sayer states that her book Australian Gypsies and Their Secret History (2017) works to dispel the myths that have falsely characterised the group and to record the stories of the modern-day Roma.

International Romani Day is another response to the discrimination faced by the community on the global level. First established in 1971 by the World Romani Congress, this holiday is celebrated on 8 April. Many Roma in Australia participate in the event, proudly recognising their heritage. Areas such as the Central Coast in New South Wales are among the most popular destinations where many members of the community travel to engage in traditions and rituals, such as music and dance.

=== Romani in the media ===
Good representation and inclusion in the media have become issues for Romani communities across the world. With the rise of tabloid culture in the twentieth and twenty-first centuries, poor media characterisations of the Roma have become more prevalent. Several studies have been conducted to showcase the kinds of stereotypes that are depicted of the Roma, and the correlation between these representations and global discriminatory attitudes. For instance, Romani communities are often tied to criminal activities, such as kidnapping and theft. Similarly, programs such as “My Big Fat Gypsy Wedding” have also played a role in the negative connotations surrounding the Romani people. Critics both in and outside of the community have argued that media often shallowly depicts the ethnic group and offers a simplistic view of their tradition and culture. It is within this debate that contentions surrounding the term ‘Gypsy’ arise.

In Australia, the Romani people are underrepresented in the media. Academic Riccardo Armillei has been outspoken about this issue, stating that the media has taken a hostile tone against the Roma and has failed to recognise them in terms of their culture and history. His work Romanies in Italy and Australia: The Concealment of the Romani Culture Behind False Myths and Romantic Views (2016) calls out various news media corporations, like the New Daily Telegraph, for their use of derogatory terms such as ‘Gypsy’ and for wrongly associating the community with criminal gangs and robberies.

=== Access to education ===
Access to education is another issue commonly faced by Romani communities due to their nomadic lifestyle. Scholar Wendy Morrow reported on a study conducted on school-aged Australian Romani children, which found that approximately 83% of participants had undergone three or less years of education. Among those children that were of high school age, only 11% were receiving an education. These students were being taught in the home by their mother.

As a result, Romani school-based education levels are significantly below those of their non-Roma counterparts. These statistics follow the community's desire to distance themselves from mainstream Australian society in order to retain a strong cultural identity. Activists, such as Wendy Morrow, have called for particular measures to be taken in order to close this gap, including the establishment of mobile schools in caravan parks in order to cater to those families that live nomadic lifestyles.

The establishment of special Romani schools across the nation was another proposed strategy. In the early 2000s, the Australian School for Romani Children opened, becoming the first school of its kind. It teaches the traditional curricular subjects in addition to Roma specific subjects, including the Romanes language, cultural practices, dancing and singing, and musical instruments. This school offers students technical trades that will allow them to work in mainstream Australian society.

== See also ==
- Romani diaspora
- Romani people
