= Lithuanian Australians =

Lithuanian Australians Australijos lietuviai
Total population
- Lithuanian; 2,582 (by birth, 2021 census); 19,430 (by ancestry, 2021 census)

Regions with significant populations
- Lithuania-born people by state or territory
- New South Wales: 1022
- Victoria: 770
- South Australia: 272
- Queensland: 255
- Western Australia: 206
- Australian Capital Territory: 39
- Tasmania: 36
- Northern Territory: 10

Languages
- Australian English · Lithuanian

Religion
- Christianity, predominantly Catholic

Related ethnic groups
- Latvian Australians, Lithuanian Americans, Lithuanian Canadians

Lithuanian Australians refers to Australian residents of Lithuanian national background or descent. According to the 2021 Census, there were 19,430 people of Lithuanian descent in Australia and 2,582 Lithuania-born people residing in the country at the moment of the census. As of 2016, the largest Lithuanian Australian community resides in the state of New South Wales, with 1022 Lithuania-born people, especially located in Sydney.

== History ==
Only small numbers of Lithuanians arrived in Australia before 1947. Many Lithuanians and other Eastern Europeans fled the Red Army in 1944 and became Displaced Persons in refugee camps in Western Europe. From 1947 they were able to emigrate to countries such as Australia under the sponsorship of the International Refugee Organization. The first voyage under Arthur Calwell's Displaced Persons immigration program, that of the General Stuart Heintzelman in 1947, was specially chosen to be all from Baltic nations, all single, many blond and blue-eyed, in order to appeal to the Australian public. Of the 843 immigrants on the Heintzelman, 442 were Lithuanian.

== Population ==
There were 16,290 people of Lithuanian descent in Australia and 2,609 Lithuania-born people residing in the country at the moment of the 2016 Census.

== See also ==
- European Australians
- Europeans in Oceania
- Immigration to Australia
- Latvian Australians
- Lithuanian Americans
- Lithuanian Canadians
