= Nordic Australians =

Total population
- c. 150,000

Languages
- Australian English · Danish · Finnish · Swedish · Norwegian · Icelandic · Faroese

Religion
- Lutheranism, other Protestant denominations, Catholic, others or none

Related ethnic groups
- Nordic New Zealanders, other European Australians

Nordic Australians are Australian citizens whose origins are found in any of the Nordic countries, or people from any of these countries who live in Australia. Danish immigrants made up the largest group by far.

In the Australian censuses, citizens of Nordic background are named as Scandinavian Australians; although Finland is significantly different culturally from Scandinavian countries and as such is not usually included among them, it is still counted as one for the sake of statistics.

== Countries of origin ==
This is a list of the countries of origin. The numbers indicate the people born in their home countries and people born in Australia of Nordic descent.

Ethnic group	Number	Ref.
(Denmark) Danish Australians (Faroe Islands) Faroese Australians	59,376	
(Finland) Finnish Australians	34,000	
(Sweden) Swedish Australians	30,375	
(Norway) Norwegian Australians	25,700	
(Iceland) Icelandic Australians	980	
Total	150,431	

=== Icelandic Australians ===
These citizens are Australian of Icelandic ancestry, or persons born in Iceland residing in Australia. The largest emigration from Iceland to Australia took place in the late 1960s, when the Australian government offered immigrants financial assistance at a time when the employment situation in Iceland was bleak. There were 980 residents who reported Icelandic ancestry in the 2011 census. They form the smallest part of the wider Nordic Australian group usually included in the census.

== See also ==
- Europeans in Oceania
- Immigration to Australia
