= Latvian Australians =

Ethnic group in Australia

Latvian Australians Austrālijas latvieši
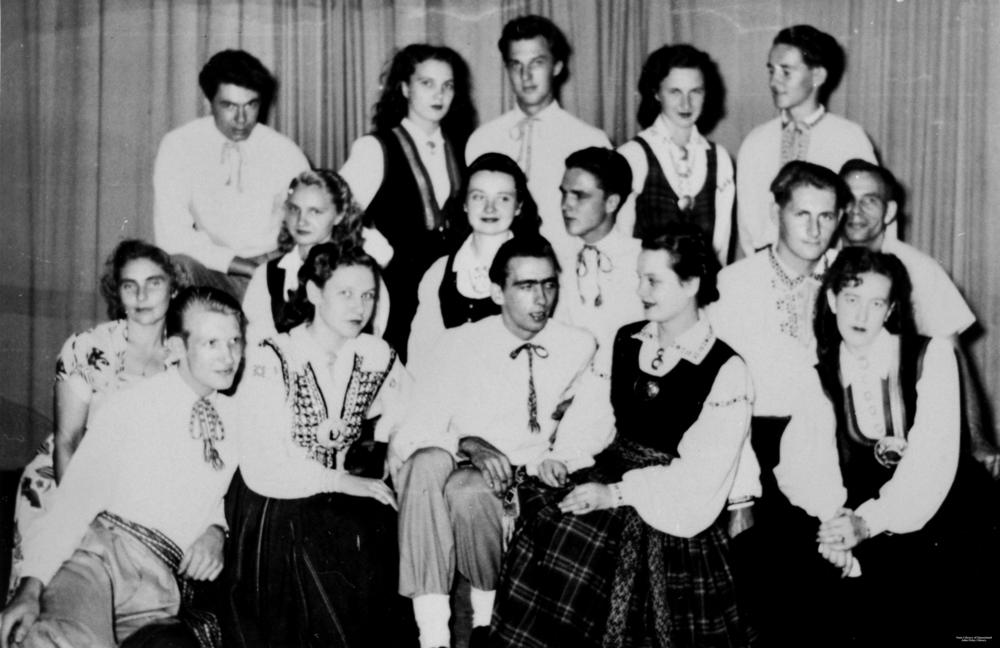
- Latvian folk dance group 'Senatne', Queensland, 1951

Total population
- Latvian; 3,758 (by birth, 2016 census); 20,509 (by ancestry, 2016 census)

Regions with significant populations
- Sydney and Melbourne

Languages
- Australian English, Latvian

Religion
- Lutheran, Roman Catholic, Orthodox

Related ethnic groups
- Estonian Australians · Lithuanian Australians · Latgalians · Kursenieki · Livonians · Latvians · Latvian Canadians · Latvian Americans

Latvian Australians are Australian citizens of Latvian descent, or persons born in Latvia who reside in Australia. At the 2016 Census, 20,509 residents in Australia reported having Latvian ancestry.

Few Latvians arrived in Australia before 1947.

Between 1947 and 1952, 19,700 Latvian refugees arrived in Australia as displaced persons under the supervision of the International Refugee Organization. The first voyage under Arthur Calwell's Displaced Persons immigration program, that of the General Stuart Heintzelman in 1947, was specially chosen to be all from Baltic nations, all single, many blond and blue-eyed, in order to appeal to the Australian public. Of the 843 immigrants on the Heintzelman, 264 were Latvian.

== Sport ==
=== Soccer ===
In 1955, the Melbourne Latvian community established its own Association football (soccer) club that competed in the modern-day Football Victoria state-league system, later folding at the conclusion of the 1959 league season. The club was founded as 'Brunswick' (later renamed as 'Brunswick Latvia'), being named after the relevant inner-northern suburb where many European immigrants settled in Melbourne following the Second World War. The club was the premier of the 'Victoria Metropolitan League South', being the southern conference of the modern-day Victorian State League 1, which was the fourth state league tier at the time which was achieved in its inaugural season of 1955.

The club's highest ladder achievement in its highest level of competition was in 1958 where the club finished eighth in the 'Victorian Metropolitan League Division One North', being the northern conference of the modern-day National Premier Leagues Victoria 2, being the state's second division at the time. The club's last season was the following season in 1959, and throughout its existence all of the club's home matches were played on the soccer ovals of Royal Park in the neighboring suburb of Parkville.

== Notable Latvian Australians ==
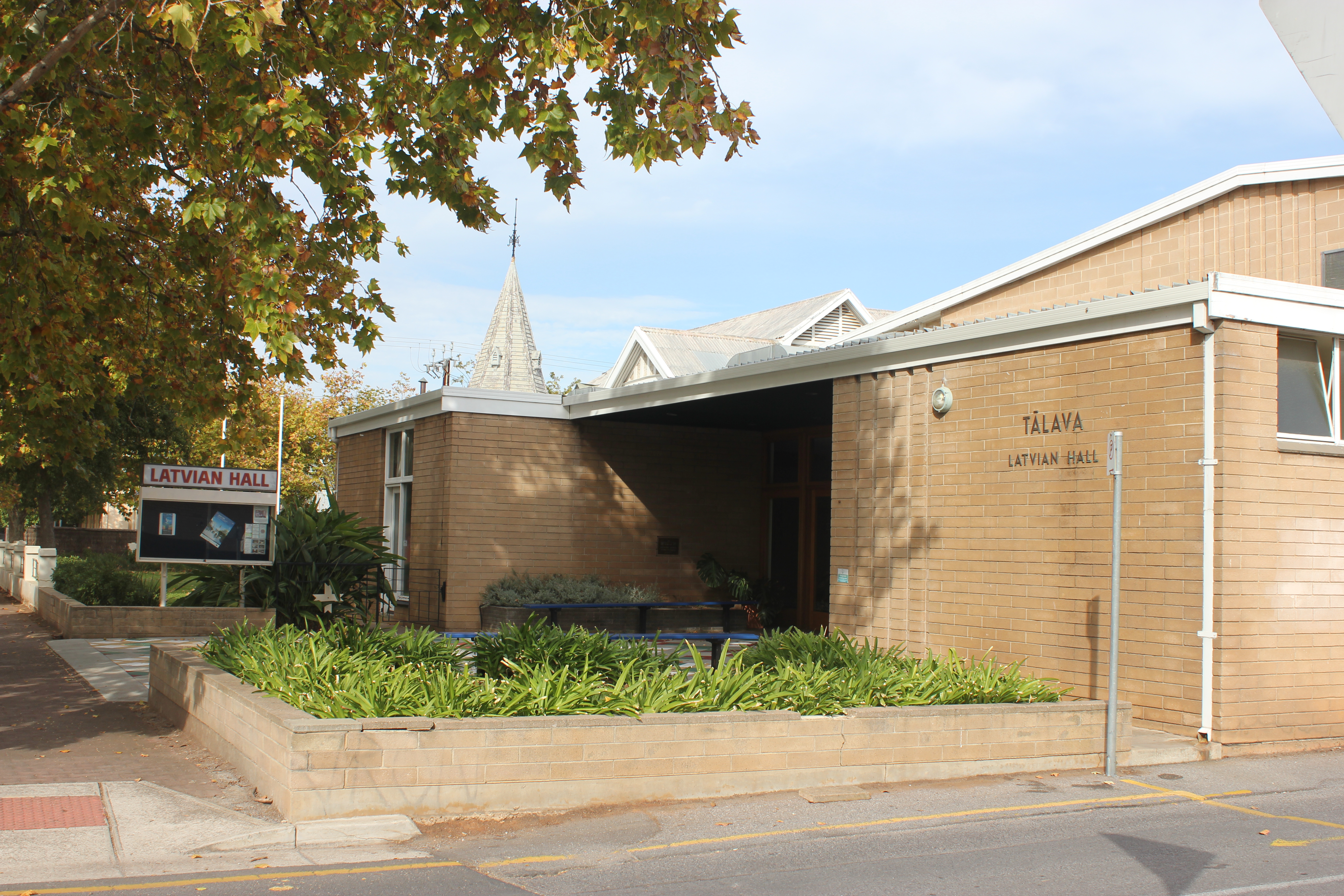
Tālava Latvian Hall in Wayville, South Australia

- Annalise Dalins, Latvian-Australian Model and Influencer, partner of Collingwood Football player Josh Daicos
- Arvids Blumentals, Latvian Crocodile Hunter known as “Crocodile Harry” and thought to be the inspiration for Crocodile Dundee
- Kriv Stenders, Latvian Australian Film Director
- Andrew Vlahov, Latvian Australian Basketball player
- Mark Blicavs, Latvian Australian rules footballer
- Peter Everitt, Latvian Australian rules football player
- Ivar Kants, Latvian Australian actor
- Theodore Boronovskis, Australian Latvian judoka
- Peter Dombrovskis, Australian Latvian photographer
- Peter Greste, Australian Latvian journalist
- Konrāds Kalējs, Australian Latvian alleged war criminal
- Ilsa Konrads, Australian Latvian Olympic swimmer
- John Konrads, Australian Latvian Olympic swimmer
- Andrej Lemanis, Latvian Australian basketball coach and former player
- John Spalvins, Australian businessman and former manager of the Adelaide Steamship Company
- Imants Tillers, Australian Latvian painter
- Nadine Wulffius, Australian Latvian ballet dancer
- Feliks Zemdegs, Australian speedcuber
- Andrew Zesers, Australian World Cup-winning cricketer
- Lucia Zundans, Australian Latvian academic

== See also ==
- Australia–Latvia relations
- Latvian diaspora
- European Australians
