= Swedish Australians =

Total population
- 8,354 (by birth, 2011); 34,029 (by ancestry, 2011)

Languages
- English · Swedish

Religion
- Irreligion and Christianity

Related ethnic groups
- Swedes, Scandinavian Australians, Danish Australians, Finnish Australians, Norwegian Australians, Swedish Americans

Swedish Australians (Swedish: Svenskaustralier) are Australians with Swedish ancestry, most often related to the large groups of immigrants from Sweden in the late nineteenth century and early twentieth century. The 2011 Census showed 34,029 people who claimed Swedish ancestry, having an increase compared to those 30,375 in 2006. Most Swedish Australians are Lutherans affiliated with the Evangelical Lutheran Church. They form the largest Scandinavian minority in Australia.

== History ==
Swedish botanist Daniel Solander (the first university-educated person to step on the Australian ground) and Britain's Sir Joseph Banks documented the flora and fauna of Australia on Captain James Cook's 1770 expedition to Australia.

King Gustav III of Sweden authorised the founding of a Swedish settlement in Western Australia in November 1786, but the outbreak of war with Russia the following year prevented this from taking place.

The Swedish immigrants that arrived in recent decades settled mostly in the suburbs of Sydney, Melbourne and Brisbane.

== Notable Swedish Australians ==
- Daniel Amalm
- Johan Anderson
- Elise Archer
- Mikael Borglund
- Caroline Johansson
- Gordon Cheng (Chinese of Swedish-origin mother)
- David Leyonhjelm
- Jack Lindwall
- Ray Lindwall
- Claes Loberg
- Kris Massie (Australian rules footballer)
- Dave Nilsson
- Kjell Nilsson
- Hulda Olsson wife of Thomas Wardle, on a trip to Sweden Thomas got the idea to his Tom the Cheap-stores.
- George Petersen
- Kerryn Phelps
- Peter Phelps
- Hugo William Du Rietz, was a pioneer gold miner and architect in Gympie, Queensland, Australia. He was the architect of many heritage-listed buildings in Gympie
- Charles Rosenthal
- Liv Hewson

== See also ==
- Australia–Sweden relations
- Swedish diaspora
