= Danish Australians =

Ethno-cultural group

Danish Australians Dansk-australiere
Total population
- 9,025 (by birth, 2011); 54,026 (by ancestry, 2011)

Languages
- Australian English; Danish

Religion
- Irreligion, Christianity

Related ethnic groups
- Danes, Danish Canadians, Danish Americans

Danish Australians are Australians with full or partial Danish ancestry.

== History of immigration ==
There was some Danish immigration at the time of the Australian gold rushes. It was estimated that there were 1,000 Danes on the Victorian goldfields. Danish immigrants had a significant effect on the Australian dairy industry from the 1880s, in particular establishing and managing butter factories.

=== Danes in Tasmania ===
During the 1870s, a number of East Prussian and Danish Lutherans arrived in Tasmania. Most of them settled in the farming district of Bismarck, attracted by the cheap land and an abundance of clean water. The area was declared a town in 1881.

Lutheranism was very slow to establish in Tasmania. Due to the absence of a Lutheran church, some of the Germans in Bismarck joined the Seventh-day Adventist Church, which arrived in the region in 1889. A Lutheran church was finally opened in Hobart on 11 August 1871 and remains active today but none was ever built in Bismarck.

=== Post-war migration ===
There was little emigration from Denmark to Australia in the first half of the twentieth century: in 1901, Australia had a population of 6,281 people who had been born in Denmark; in 1947, that number had slackened to 2,759. At both counts, the population was approximately 75% male. Danish men married women of other ethnicities in Australia, which made it harder for the community to maintain its identity.

Danish citizens were within the scope of Australia's Post-war immigration scheme. From a population of 2,954 Danish Australians in 1954, there were 7,911 Danes living in Australia in 1981. Masculinity ratios were healthier, with 58% of these being males.

At the 2006 Census, 8,963 Australian residents declared they were born in Denmark. In addition, 50,413 Australian residents claimed Danish ancestry, either singularly or with another ancestry.

== Culture ==
There is a Danish Australian Cultural Society. The Australian Danish community has been written about in books.

The Danish Royal Life Guards have a chapter of their veterans association in Australia.

== Notable Danish Australians ==
Name	Born	Notable for	Connection with Australia and Denmark
Joh Bjelke-Petersen	1911–2005	Former Queensland Premier	New Zealand-born of Danish descent
Carl Adolf Feilberg	1844–1887	Journalist, commentator, human rights activist	Danish-born
Jørgen Jensen	1891–1922	Businessman	Danish-born Australian recipient of the Victoria Cross
Jørgen Jørgensen	1780–1841	Sailor and Adventurer	Danish-born
Marie Bjelke Petersen	1874–1969	Novelist	Danish-born
Candy Devine	—	Broadcaster	Of Danish, Spanish, Scottish, Sri Lankan, Filipino, Polynesian and West Indian descent
Mary Hansen	1966–2002	Guitarist and Singer	Of Danish and Irish descent
Dennis Olsen	1938-	Singer and Actor	
Lawrence Springborg	1968-	Politician	Of Danish and German descent
George Christensen	1978-	Politician	Of Danish descent
David Andersen	1980-	Basketball player	
James Sorensen	1986-	Actor	Of Danish and Portuguese descent
Anja Nissen	1995-	Singer	Australian-born of Danish-born parents
Tom Boyd	1995-	Australian rules football player	Danish mother
Erika Heynatz	1975-	Model, actress, singer, and television personality	Papua New Guinean-born Australian, Danish grandfather

== See also ==
- Australia–Denmark relations
- Collinsvale, Tasmania
- Scandinavian Australians
- Anglo-Celtic Australians
- Danish diaspora
- Finnish Australians
- Norwegian Australians
- Swedish Australians
- Danish New Zealanders
