= North African and Middle Eastern Australians =

Total population
- Approximately 3.0% of the population (2021 census); Lebanese Australians: 248,434; Turkish Australians: 87,164; Iranian Australians: 81,119; Egyptian Australians: 60,164; Arab Australians: 60,095; Iraqi Australians: 57,859; Assyrian Australians: 62,452; Syrian Australians: 29,257; Sudanese Australians: 16,809; Palestinian Australians: 15,607 Other North African and Middle Eastern: 11,027; Kurdish Australians: 10,171

Languages
- Australian English · Arabic · Aramaic · Azerbaijani · Hebrew · Kurdish · Persian · Turkish · others

Religion
- Christianity (Eastern Orthodoxy · Oriental Orthodoxy · Assyrian Church of the East · Catholicism · Protestantism) · Islam · Judaism · Baháʼí Faith · Druze · None (Atheism · Agnosticism) · Zoroastrianism · Yazidism · Mandaeism · Deism

North African and Middle Eastern Australians are the Australians of North African and Middle Eastern ancestry, including naturalised Australians who are immigrants from various regions in the North Africa and Middle East and descendants of such immigrants. At the 2021 census, the number of ancestry responses categorised within North African and Middle Eastern ancestral groups as a proportion of the total population amounted to 3.0%.

Today, North African and Middle Eastern Australians often come from various ethnic, cultural, linguistic, religious, educational and employment backgrounds.

== History ==
The first settlers of the North Africans and Middle Easterners to Australia date back to 1862, when small groups of mainly Muslim cameleers shipped in and out of Australia at three-year intervals to serve South Australia's inland pastoral industry by carting goods and transportation wool bales by camel trains, who were commonly referred to as "Afghans" or "Ghans", despite their origin often being mainly from British India.

Permanent emigration of North Africans and Middle Easterners to Australia began in the 1940s onwards, possibly due to political turmoil in the MENA region that saw a wave of its international migrants. As of 2021, they number 800,000 persons with a nomination of their distinct ancestries.

== Demographics ==
Australia does not collect statistics on the racial origins of its residents. Instead, it collects data at each five-yearly census on distinct ancestries, of which each census respondent may choose up to two. In the 2021 census, the number of ancestry responses categorized within North African and Middle Eastern ancestral groups as a proportion of the total population amounted to 3.2%.

Persons nominating North African and Middle Eastern Australian ancestries in 2021
Ancestry	Population
Assyrian Australians	62,452
Arab Australians	60,095
Algerian Australians	2,319
Coptic Australians	1,433
Berber Australians	340
Bahraini Australians	166
Bari Australians	95
Darfuri Australians	15
Lebanese Australians	248,434
Iranian Australians	81,119
Egyptian Australians	60,164
Iraqi Australians	57,859
Palestinian Australians	15,607
Saudi Arabian Australians	14,214
Other North African and Middle Eastern	11,027
Kurdish Australians	10,171
Jordanian Australians	6,096
Moroccan Australians	4,192
Libyan Australians	1,076
Mandaean Australians	918
Kuwaiti Australians	815
Nuer Australians	185
Omani Australians	168
Nubian Australians	130
Emirati Australians	63
Qatari Australians	23
Turkish Australians	87,164
Syrian Australians	29,257
Sudanese Australians	16,809
Yemeni Australians	1,443
Tunisian Australians	1,037
Yazidi Australians	876

== Social and political issues ==
=== Asylum seekers ===
Asylum policy is a contentious wedge issue in Australian politics, with the two major political parties in Australia arguing that the issue is a border control problem and one concerning the safety of those attempting to come to Australia by boat.

In 1999, Middle Eastern immigrants fleeing from oppressive regimes in Afghanistan, Iran and Iraq began to arrive in large numbers. The Howard government extended the time they spent in mandatory detention and introduced temporary protection visas for boat arrivals. The deterrents did little to stop immigrants; roughly 12,000 asylum seekers reached Australia from 1999 to 2001. In 2011, Australia received 2.5% of the world's total number of claims for asylum. During 2012, more than 17,000 asylum seekers arrived via boat. The majority of the refugees came from Afghanistan, Iran, and Sri Lanka. In June 2012, a boatload of asylum seekers capsized in the Indian Ocean between Indonesia and Christmas Island, leading to 17 confirmed deaths, with 70 other people missing.

In 2015, the government rejected suggestions that it would accept Rohingyas (a persecuted Muslim minority in Myanmar) during the Rohingya refugee crisis, with the Prime Minister Tony Abbott responding "Nope, nope, nope. We have a very clear refugee and humanitarian program". However, later in the year the government unexpectedly increased its intake of refugees to accommodate persecuted minorities, such as Maronites, Yazidis and Druze, from the conflicts of the Syrian Civil War and Iraq War. (It was these refugees who swelled the figures for 2016–2017.)

=== Discrimination and violence ===
Attacks in Spain, London, and Bali have increasingly associated people of "Middle Eastern appearance" with terrorism. A clearer picture of the impact of these events on Sydney's Muslim, Arabic, and Middle Eastern population emerged from data collected from a hotline between 12 September 2001, and 11 November 2001, by the Community Relations Commission for a Multicultural NSW, during which time 248 incidents were logged. There were seven categories of attack: physical assault; verbal assault; sexual assault; threat; racial discrimination or harassment, damage to property; and media attack. Half of all victims were female; thirty percent were children. The largest language groups to use the hotline were Arabic, comprising 52.4% of calls. 47.2% of the incidents occurred in public spaces.

On 11 December 2005, a violent mob of about five thousand young white Australians gathered on the beach at Cronulla, New South Wales. Waving Australian flags, and singing Waltzing Matilda and Australia's national anthem, the mob verbally abused and physically assaulted anyone of Middle Eastern appearance. Five thousand people reportedly gathered at the site and marched through the streets of Cronulla, attacking anyone who they identified as Middle Eastern.

One victim recalled how the violence erupted when a man deemed to be "of Middle Eastern appearance" was walking along the beachfront with his girlfriend and "two girls turned around and screamed ... 'get off our f__king beaches' [and then] the whole street turned on them" The riots put the spotlight on two segments of Sydney's population (the white, Anglo-Celtic majority and a Middle Eastern minority) and two parts of the city: the Sutherland Shire Local Government Area (LGA), located in Sydney's southern suburbs where Cronulla Beach is located (known as the Shire); and the Canterbury and Bankstown LGAs, located in south-western Sydney, where most of the city's Lebanese and other Middle Eastern immigrants live. Middle Eastern males were tagged as criminal and un-Australian by the media brush of ethnic crime.

In one incident, two young men of Middle Eastern appearance, on their way for a swim, were mobbed and beaten on a train carriage, with both responding police officers and a nearby press photographer fearing there would be a killing.

The latest incident occurred in 2011, when the criminal lawyer of Middle Eastern background, Adam Houda, was arrested for refusing a frisk search and resisting arrest after having been approached by police, who suspected him of involvement in a recent robbery. These charges were thrown out of court by Judge John Connell, who stated, "At the end of the day, there were three men of Middle Eastern appearance walking along a suburban street, for all the police knew, minding their own business at an unexceptional time of day, in unexceptional clothing, except two of the men had hooded jumpers. The place they were in could not have raised a reasonable suspicion they were involved in the robberies."

==== Islamophobia ====
Islamophobia is highly speculative and affective distrust and hostility towards Muslims, Islam, and those perceived as following the religion. This social aversion and bias is often facilitated and perpetuated in the media through the stereotyping of Muslims as violent and uncivilised. Various Australian politicians and political commentators have capitalised on these negative stereotypes and this has contributed to the marginalisation, discrimination and exclusion of the Muslim community.

Islamophobia and intolerance towards Muslims existed well prior to the September 11 attacks in the United States. For example, Muslim immigration to Australia was restricted under the White Australia Policy (1901-1975).

== See also ==
- African Australians
- American Australians
- Arab Australians
- Asian Australians
- Black Australians
- Caribbean and West Indian Australians
- European Australians
- Indigenous Australians
- Latin American Australians
- Arab diaspora
- Assyrian Australians
- Australian Jews
- Christianity in Australia
- Coptic Australians
- Egyptian diaspora
- Islam in Australia
- Lebanese diaspora
- Palestinian diaspora
- Syrian diaspora
- Syrian Australians
