= Iraqi Australians =

أستراليون عراقيون

Total population
- 57,859 (by ancestry, 2021) (0.4% of the Australian population 92,922 (by birth, 2021)

Regions with significant populations
- Sydney, Melbourne, Perth, Brisbane, Adelaide

Languages
- Mesopotamian Arabic and Australian English also Kurdish (Sorani, Feyli and Kurmanji dialects), Turkish (Iraqi Turkmen/Turkoman dialects), and Assyrian Neo-Aramaic, and Mandaic)

Religion
- Catholicism (39.4%), Islam (25.4%), Others (10.8%) Assyrian Apostolic (8.7%), Other Christianity (5.7%)

Related ethnic groups
- Iraqi Americans, Assyrian Australians, Syrian Australians, Iraqi diaspora

Iraqi Australians (Arabic: أستراليون عراقيون) are Australian citizens who identify themselves to be Iraqi descent. Since the 1991 Gulf War, thousands of Iraqis have found refuge in Australia. The total of population is estimated to be as high as 95,000.

The first year in which the Australian Census of Population and Housing recorded the Iraq-born separately was 1976, when the population was 2,273. By 1986, the population had risen to 4,516. By the end of the Gulf War in 1991, it numbered 5,186, mainly in New South Wales and Victoria.

Many recent arrivals have entered Australia under the Humanitarian programme. The Gulf War and the quelling of uprisings of the Shi'a and the Kurds in Iraq resulted in a large increase in the number of Iraqis coming to Australia after 1991.

== History ==
The number of permanent settlers arriving in Australia from Iraq since 1991 (monthly)

People born in Iraq as a percentage of the population in Sydney divided geographically by postal area, as of the 2011 census

Iraqi-born Victorians were first identified in the Victorian census in 1976, when 189 people were recorded. Within five years the community had almost tripled to 408, and by 1991 had increased to 603. Most Iraqis had escaped hardships caused by the eight-year Iran–Iraq War, which ended in 1988.

The outbreak of the Gulf War in 1991 led a large number of people to flee Iraq into the neighbouring countries. Some refugees lived in processing camps for up to five years before being accepted into Australia under the Special Humanitarian Program. During this period the visas of around 400 Iraqis living in Australia were extended until the end of the Gulf War.

Iraqi immigration to Australia peaked between 1992 and 1995, with the Iraq-born population in Victoria increasing to 3,492 by 1996. By 2001 this community had increased a further 74% to 6,091 people. Most recent Iraqi immigrants have arrived under the Family and Skilled Migration categories. Some Iraqis have sought refugee status after arrival in Australia, and have been detained pending processing.

Today the Iraq-born community in Australia is culturally diverse, with settlers from many ethnic and cultural backgrounds including Arabs, Assyrians, Kurds, Turkomans, and Mandaeans. Although Islam is the dominant religion in Iraq, only 29% of the Iraq-born immigrants living in Victoria are Muslim; 68% are Christian and who are mostly Assyrian.

Nearly half of the Iraqi community speaks Arabic at home; only 3% speaks English, reflecting the number of recent immigrants in the community. Over half of Iraq-born Victorians are aged under 35, and only 12% are aged over fifty. Of those in the workforce, both men and women are most commonly employed as labourers and related workers within the manufacturing industry, while nearly a quarter are employed in professional positions. The community is supported by organisations such as the Australian Iraqi Forum several religious or cultural associations.

The Australian movie Ali's Wedding portrays the Iraqi Australian experience, stemming from actor/writer Osamah Sami's real-life journey from war-torn Iraq to refugee life in Australia, blending cultural specifics (Islamic faith, arranged marriage and family duty).

== Demographics ==
Iraqi Australian demography by religion (note that it includes only Iraqi born in Iraq and not australian with Iraqis ancestries)
Religious group	2021 (Note: Religious breakdown proportions based on "Iraqi" ethnic or cultural origin response on the 2021 census.)		2016 (Note: Religious breakdown proportions based on "Iraqi" ethnic or cultural origin response on the 2016 census.)		2011 (Note: Religious breakdown proportions based on "Iraq" ethnic or cultural origin response on the 2011 census.)	
Religious group	Pop.	%	Pop.	%	Pop.	%
Catholic	36,566 ▲	39.35% ▲	23,776 ▲	35.3% ▼	17,178	35.66%
Assyrian	8,059 ▲	8.67% ▼	6,725 ▲	9.98% ▼	5,748	11.93%
Oriental Orthodox	2,484 ▲	2.67% ▲	1,067 ▲	1.58% ▼	765	1.59%
Eastern Orthodox	793 ▲	0.85% ▲	569 ▼	0.84% ▼	1,680	3.49%
Protestant and Other Christian	7,016 ▲	7.55% ▲	4,704 ▲	6.98% ▲	2,245	4.66%
(Total Christian)	54,914 ▲	59.1% ▲	36,846 ▲	54.71% ▼	27,618	57.34%
Islam	23,593 ▲	25.39% ▼	21,137 ▲	31.38% ▼	15,395	31.96%
Other (Mostly zoroastrians)	10,095 ▲	10.86% ▲	5,036 ▲	7.48% ▲	2,908	6.04%
Buddhism	23 ▲	0.02%	15 ▼	0.02% ▼	17	0.04%
Hinduism	11 ▼	0.01% ▼	19 ▲	0.03% ▼	18	0.04%
Judaism	99 ▲	0.11% ▼	88 ▼	0.13% ▼	100	0.21%
No religion	2,238 ▲	2.41% ▼	1,851 ▲	2.75% ▲	757	1.57%
Not stated	1,437 ▼	1.55% ▼	1,886 ▲	2.8% ▲	1,067	2.22%
Total Iraqi Australian population	92,922 ▲	100%	67,355 ▲	100%	48,169	100%

Iraqi Australian demography by religion (Ancestry included)
Religious group	2021		2016		2011	
Religious group	Pop.	%	Pop.	%	Pop.	%
Catholic	55,636 ▲	36.9% ▲	35,564 ▲	32.26% ▼	25,794	33.87%
Assyrian	8,906 ▲	5.91% ▼	7,245 ▲	6.57% ▼	6,176	8.11%
Oriental Orthodox	3,483 ▲	2.31% ▲	1,576 ▲	1.43% ▲	988	1.3%
Eastern Orthodox	1,195 ▲	0.79% ▲	828 ▼	0.75% ▼	2,201	2.89%
Protestant and Other Christian	10,562 ▲	7% ▲	7,088 ▲	6.43% ▲	3,402	4.47%
(Total Christian)	79,771 ▲	52.91% ▲	52,320 ▲	47.46% ▼	38,756	50.88%
Islam	45,182 ▲	29.97% ▼	41,191 ▲	37.37% ▼	29,050	38.14%
Other (Mostly zoroastrians)	17,945 ▲	11.9% ▲	8,900 ▲	8.07% ▲	4,893	6.42%
Buddhism	38 ▲	0.03%	33 ▲	0.03% ▼	31	0.04%
Hinduism	16 ▼	0.01% ▼	22 ▲	0.02%	18	0.02%
Judaism	656 ▲	0.44% ▼	561 ▲	0.51% ▼	454	0.6%
No religion	4,172 ▲	2.77% ▼	3,269 ▲	2.97% ▲	1,254	1.65%
Not stated	2,190 ▼	1.45% ▼	3,249 ▲	2.95% ▲	1,467	1.93%
Total Iraqi Australian population	150,781 ▲	100%	110,234 ▲	100%	76,165	100%

== Notable people ==
- Oren Ambarchi, an Iraqi Jewish musician
- Mari Emmanuel, Christian priest
- Faisal Faisal, athlete
- Don Hany (born 1975), actor (known for his role as Theo Rahme in White Collar Blue)
- Ali Abbas Al-Hilfi, footballer born in Iraq who plays for Newcastle Jets
- Toba Khedoori, artist
- Ninos Khoshaba, Assyrian politician and former member of Parliament in New South Wales
- Brikha Nasoraia, Mandaean priest and professor
- Andrew Rohan, Member of the New South Wales legislative Assembly representing the district of Fairfield
- Osamah Sami, actor
- Mario Shabow, Assyrian football player for the Central Coast Mariners FC in the Hyundai A-League
- Mohamed Al-Taay, football player for the Wellington Phoenix in the Hyundai A-League

== See also ==
- Arab diaspora
- Assyrian Australians
- Mandaean Australians
- Lebanese Australians
- Syrian Australians
- Iranian Australians
- Kurdish Australians
- Turkish Australians
