= Lebanese Australians =

People of Lebanese descent resident in Australia

Total population
- 87,343 (by birth, 2021); 248,430 (by ancestry, 2021) (1.32% of the Australian population (Ancestry and birth combined))

Regions with significant populations
- Sydney, Melbourne and other urban areas

Languages
- Australian English, Lebanese Arabic, Standard Arabic, French, Armenian, Aramaic-Syriac

Religion
- Catholicism (48.2%), Islam (35.1%), Eastern Orthodox (9.9%), No religion (3.4%) and Protestant/Evangelical (3.4%)

Related ethnic groups
- Lebanese British, Lebanese Americans, Lebanese Canadians, Lebanese New Zealanders

Lebanese Australians (Arabic: اللبنانيون الأستراليون) refers to citizens or permanent residents of Australia of Lebanese ancestry. The population is diverse, having a large Christian religious base, being mostly Maronite Catholics, while also having a large Muslim group of Sunni and Shia branches.

Lebanon, in both its modern-day form as the Lebanese state (declared 1920; independent 1943), and its historical form as the region of the Lebanon, has been a source of migrants to Australia since the 1870s. 248,430 Australians (about 1% of the total population) claimed some Lebanese ancestry in 2021. The 2021 census reported 87,343 Lebanese-born people in Australia, with nearly 66,000 of those resident in Greater Sydney.

== Diaspora history ==
=== 19th-century migration ===
As part of a large-scale emigration in the 1870s, Lebanese Christians fleeing the Ottoman Empire's declining economy, migrated to the United Kingdom, Brazil, Argentina and other Latin American nations, particularly Venezuela, Colombia, and Ecuador. Many also went to the United States, Canada and Australia, primarily the eastern states, and New South Wales in particular.

In the 1890s, the numbers of Lebanese immigrants to Australia rose, part of the mass emigration from the area of Lebanon that became the modern Lebanese state and the Anti-Lebanon Mountains region that became Syria.

=== Second wave of migration ===
The Lebanese-born population numbered 24,000 in 1971. Following the outbreak of the Lebanese Civil War in 1975–1990, this wave of migrants were often poor and for the first time, over half of them were Muslim. This influx of new migrants changed the character of the established Lebanese community in Australia significantly, especially in Sydney where 70% of the Lebanese-born population were concentrated.

Christian Maronite and Orthodox Lebanese Christians that settled in Australia over the last two centuries were able to gain some influence within Australian politics. In late 1975, unrest in Lebanon caused a group of influential Maronite Australians to approach Australian Prime Minister Malcolm Fraser and his immigration minister, Michael MacKellar regarding the resettling of Lebanese civilians with their Australian relatives. Immediate access to Australia could not be granted under normal immigration categories, thus the Lebanese people were categorised as refugees. This was not in the traditional sense as the Lebanese people were not fleeing from persecution but escaping from internal conflict between Muslim and Christian groups. This action was known as the "Lebanon Concession".

Between 1975–1990, more than 30,000 civil war refugees arrived in Australia. Most immigrants were Muslim Lebanese from deprived rural areas who learned of Australia's Lebanon Concession and decided to seek a better life. They were Muslims from northern Lebanon as Christian and Muslim Lebanese were unwilling to leave the capital city, Beirut. Immigrants of the Lebanese Concession primarily settled in south-west Sydney; Sunnis in Lakemba and Shias in Arncliffe.

=== Return migration ===
Lebanese Australians have a moderate rate of return migration to Lebanon. In December 2001, the Department of Foreign Affairs estimated that there were 30,000 Australian citizen residents in Lebanon. During the 2006 Israel-Lebanon conflict, the Australian Government organised mass evacuations of Australian residents in Lebanon.

== Demographics ==
Worldwide, most people of Lebanese ancestry today live outside Lebanon, and are known as the Lebanese diaspora which numbers from 8 to possibly 14 million.

=== Locations ===
In New South Wales, most Lebanese Australians were reported to reside in the Western Sydney council areas of City of Bankstown, with City of Holroyd, City of Canterbury and City of Parramatta (all pre-2016 council areas). The area included suburbs such as Lakemba, Greenacre and Punchbowl.

In Victoria, like most Middle-Easterners, Lebanese Australians are mostly found in the North and West of Melbourne, in areas such as the City of Hume, City of Merri-bek, and the City of Whittlesea , particularly in suburbs such as Broadmeadows, Coburg, Preston, Campbellfield, Altona North, and Glenroy.

=== Religious diversity ===
Religion of Lebanese australian (ancestry incl.)
1. Catholicism (37.0%)
2. Eastern Orthodox (6.65%)
3. Protestantism (4.57%)
4. Oriental Orthodoxy (0.57%)
5. Islam (40.7%)
6. Druze (1.37%)
7. Irreligion (6.99%)
8. Other (2.03%)

According to the 2021 census, 33.8% of Australians, who were born in Lebanon were Catholics, 7.1% were Eastern Orthodox, 4.4% were Protestant, 1.2% were Oriental Orthodox, 45.1% were Muslims, and 3.8% followed secular or no religious beliefs.

Lebanese-born Australian demography by religion
Religious group	2021 (Note: Religious breakdown proportions based on "Lebanese" ethnic or cultural origin response on the 2021 census.)		2016 (Note: Religious breakdown proportions based on "Lebanese" ethnic or cultural origin response on the 2016 census.)		2011 (Note: Religious breakdown proportions based on "Lebanese" ethnic or cultural origin response on the 2011 census.)	
Religious group	Pop.	%	Pop.	%	Pop.	%
Catholic	29,549 ▲	33.83% ▼	26,872 ▼	34.17% ▼	28,008	36.64%
Eastern Orthodox	6,170 ▲	7.06% ▼	5,635 ▼	7.16% ▼	7,164	9.37%
Oriental Orthodox	1,010 ▼	1.16% ▼	1,029 ▼	1.31% ▼	1,071	1.4%
Protestant and Other christian	3,837 ▲	4.39% ▼	3,481 ▲	4.43% ▲	2,225	2.91%
(Total Christian)	40,570 ▲	46.45% ▼	37,026 ▼	47.08% ▼	38,466	50.32%
Islam	39,406 ▲	45.12% ▲	34,196 ▲	43.48% ▼	33,560	43.9%
No religion	3,352 ▲	3.84% ▲	2,830 ▲	3.6% ▲	1,274	1.67%
Buddhism	30 ▲	0.03%	23 ▼	0.03%	26	0.03%
Hinduism	14 ▼	0.02%	17 ▲	0.02% ▲	3	0%
Judaism	27 ▼	0.03% ▼	35 ▲	0.04% ▲	24	0.03%
Other (mostly Druze)	1,476 ▲	1.69% ▲	1,055 ▼	1.34% ▼	1,069	1.4%
Not stated	2,273 ▼	2.6% ▼	3,318 ▲	4.22% ▲	1,909	2.5%
Total Lebanese Australian population	87,340 ▲	100%	78,651 ▲	100%	76,450 ▲	100%

Lebanese Australian demography by religion (Ancestry included)
Religious group	2021		2016		2011	
Religious group	Pop.	%	Pop.	%	Pop.	%
Catholic	124,103 ▲	36.96% ▲	113,319 ▲	36.61% ▼	109,706	39.24%
Eastern Orthodox	22,335 ▲	6.65% ▲	20,321 ▼	6.57% ▼	23,758	8.5%
Oriental Orthodox	1,926 ▲	0.57% ▼	1,829 ▲	0.58% ▼	1,694	0.61%
Protestant and Other christian	15,334 ▲	4.57% ▼	14,256 ▲	4.61% ▲	9,754	3.49%
(Total Christian)	163,703▲	48.75% ▲	149,707 ▲	48.37% ▼	144,905	51.83%
Islam	136,671 ▲	40.7% ▼	126,260 ▲	40.79% ▼	115,928	41.46%
No religion	23,457 ▲	6.99% ▲	16,685 ▲	5.39% ▲	8,090	2.89%
Buddhism	201 ▲	0.06%	178 ▼	0.06%	179	0.06%
Hinduism	57 ▲	0.02% ▲	45 ▲	0.01%	25	0.01%
Judaism	100 ▲	0.03%	95 ▲	0.03%	88	0.03%
Other (mostly Druze)	4,599 ▲	1.37% ▲	3,457 ▲	1.12% ▼	3,288	1.18%
Not stated	6,445 ▼	1.92% ▼	12,467 ▲	4.03% ▲	6,513	2.33%
Total Lebanese Australian population	335,775 ▲	100%	309,523 ▲	100%	279,588	100%

== Business ==
The peak business body is the Australian Lebanese Chamber of Commerce, with associations in both Sydney and Melbourne.

== Arts, culture, terminology ==
In 1996, Lebanon...Imprisoned Splendour the first Australian documentary about the impact of the Lebanese Civil War on Australian Lebanese was released by journalist Daizy Gedeon who was deputy foreign editor at The Australian newspaper. The film featured Omar Sharif and won global acclaim. In 2014, a series of documentaries on Lebanese Australians was presented by SBS under the title Once Upon a Time in Punchbowl.

The Lebanese Film Festival was launched in Sydney in 2012. Every year since then, it has showcases films which are either filmed or based in Lebanon, or made by Lebanese film makers throughout the world. The organisation is based in Bankstown, but the film festival travels to cinemas in Newcastle and Bowral in NSW, as well as Adelaide, Canberra, Melbourne and Brisbane from August to November each year.

In 2017–8, two seasons of the sitcom Here Come the Habibs, featuring a Lebanese Australian family who win the lottery and move to the posh eastern suburbs of Sydney, aired on Channel 9.

Michael Mohammed Ahmad's 2018 comic novel The Lebs was shortlisted for the 2019 Miles Franklin Award. He had previously written an essay entitled "Lebs and Punchbowl Prison", the prison referring to his alma mater, Punchbowl Boys' High School. At his school, the term "Lebs" did not refer just to boys from Lebanese family, but to anyone whose family came from the Middle East, and even included boys with African and Indonesian backgrounds. The term "Leb" or "Lebo" has been used as a derogatory term, mostly in Sydney and Melbourne, and gained more widespread use after the 2005 Cronulla Riots. It is listed in the Collins English Dictionary as "Australian (offensive, slang), a person from Lebanon or of Lebanese origin". Ahmad wishes to help reclaim the word through his writing.

== See also ==
- List of Lebanese people in Australia
- Arab Australian
- Arab diaspora
- Assyrian Australians
- Mandaean Australians
- Iraqi Australians
- Syrian Australians
- Iranian Australians
- Kurdish Australians
- Turkish Australians
