= Iranian Football Association Australia =

- Founded: August 2014; 11 years ago
- League: National Premier Leagues NSW

Iranian Football Association Australia is an Australian football (soccer) club from Sydney that represents the Iranian community in Australia.

== History ==
IFAA was established in August 2014 in Sydney and promotes football and futsal in Australia.
