= Jordanian Australians =

Total population
- 4,621 (Jordan-born) (2011 Census); 4,218 (Jordanian ancestry) (2011 Census)

Regions with significant populations
- New South Wales: 3,047

Languages
- Australian English, Jordanian Arabic,

Religion
- Islam; Some Christian

Related ethnic groups
- Arab Australians, Arab Americans

Jordanian Australians (Arabic: الأردنيون الأستراليون) refers to Australians of Jordanian descent or a Jordan-born person who resides in Australia. According to Australia's 2011 Census there were a total of 4,621 Jordan-born people in Australia, an increase of 24.2 per cent from the 2006 Census (3,397). The vast majority of Jordanian Australians reside in the state of New South Wales.

Notably immigration from Jordan is one of the most recent in Australia.

== Jordan's demography ==
The current population of Jordan is steadily increased in the last few decades but faster in the last few years to reach 7,825,208 as of Tuesday, 7 February 2017, based on the latest United Nations estimates. This is about 0.1% Country's Share of World Population putting Jordan on 101 position of the global rank. However, the yearly population growth rate has been reported to reduce from 12% in 1950 to 1.66% at present (2017).

== Age and Sex ==
The median age of the Jordan-born in 2011 was 36 years compared with 45 years for all overseas-born and 37 years for the total Australian population. The age distribution showed 12.9 per cent were aged 0–14 years, 12.1 per cent were 15–24 years, 39.8 per cent were 25–44 years, 29.4 per cent were 45–64 years and 5.8 per cent were 65 years and over. Of the Jordan-born in Australia, there were 2559 males (55.4 per cent) and 2060 females (44.6 per cent). The sex ratio was 124.2 males per 100 females.

== Ancestry ==
In the 2011 census, the top ancestry responses that Jordan-born people reported were Jordanian (1909), Arab (937) and Palestinian (732). In the 2011 Census, Australians reported around 300 different ancestries. Of the total ancestry responses, 4218 responses were towards Jordanian ancestry.

- At the 2011 census up to two responses per person were allowed for the Ancestry question; therefore providing the total responses and not persons count.

== Language ==
The main languages spoken at home by Jordan-born people in Australia were Arabic (3785), English (416) and Armenian (162). Of the 4203 Jordan-born who spoke a language other than English at home, 89 per cent spoke English very well or well, and 10.1 per cent spoke English not well or not at all.

== Religion ==
At the 2011 census the major religious affiliations amongst Jordan-born were Islam (2260), Catholic (1020) and Eastern Orthodox (536). Of the Jordan-born, 3.2 per cent stated 'No Religion or Atheist' which was lower than that of the total Australian population (22.3 per cent), and 2.4 per cent did not state a religion.

== Arrival ==
Compared to 62 per cent of the total overseas-born population, 57.4 per cent of the Jordan-born people in Australia arrived in Australia prior to 2001. Among the total Jordan-born in Australia at the 2011 census, 19.1 per cent arrived between 2001 and 2006 and 19.3 per cent arrived between 2007 and 2011.

== Median Income ==
At the time of the 2011 Census, the median individual weekly income for the Jordan-born in Australia aged 15 years and over was $384, compared with $538 for all overseas-born and $597 for all Australia-born. The total Australian population had a median individual weekly income of $577.

== Qualifications ==
At the 2011 census, 60.4 per cent of the Jordan-born aged 15 years and over had some form of higher non-school qualifications compared to 55.9 per cent of the Australian population. Of the Jordan-born aged 15 years and over, 9.7 per cent were still attending an educational institution. The corresponding rate for the total Australian population was 8.6 per cent.

== Employment ==
Among Jordan-born people aged 15 years and over, the participation rate in the labour force was 56.6 per cent and the unemployment rate was 11.8 per cent. The corresponding rates in the total Australian population were 65 per cent and 5.6 per cent respectively. Of the 1974 Jordan-born who were employed, 51.4 per cent were employed in either a skilled managerial, professional or trade occupation. The corresponding rate in the total Australian population was 48.4 per cent.

== Embassy of the Hashemite Kingdom of Jordan in Australia ==
17 Cobbadah Street, O’Malley ACT 2606, AUSTRALIA

== Embassy of Australia in Jordan ==
41 Kayed Al-Armoti Street Abdoun Al-Janoubi Amman Jordan

Mailing Address: Australian Embassy, P.O.Box 35201, Amman 11180 Jordan

== See also ==
- Arab Australians
- Jordanian people
- Assyrian Australians
