= Syrian Australians =

Ethnic group in Australia

السوريون في أستراليا

Total population
- 29,096 (by Australian Census, 2021) (Note: The number 29,096 represents the count of people living in Australia who were born in Syria, according to data from the 2021 Australian Bureau of Statistics (ABS) census.)

Languages
- Australian English, Syrian Arabic, Assyrian, Standard Arabic, Turkish, Kurdish, Armenian, French (minority)

Religion
- Christianity (58.7%), Islam (37.2%)

Related ethnic groups
- Other Arab Australians, Syrian people, Lebanese Australians

Syrian Australians are Australians of Syrian descent or Syria-born people who reside in the Commonwealth of Australia. Australian Syrians make up 0.4 percent of the Australian population (55,321 people), with a gender split of 51.3 percent female, 49.7 percent male. The 2016 Australian census revealed 68.8 percent of Syrian Australian homes have Arabic as the language spoken at home, however of the homes where English is not the first spoken language, 37.7 percent are able to speak English fluently. The majority of Syrian Australians arrived prior to 2007 (45.2 percent), with a small group immigrating between 2007–2011 (8.5 percent) then a larger group entering between 2012–2016 (41.3 percent).

Australia has opened its doors to Syrian refugees by prioritizing all persecuted minorities. These include Assyrians, Druze, Syrian Turkmen, and the Yazidis.

== History ==
With Syria once part of the Ottoman Empire, Syrian immigration was only differentiated from Turk immigration in the late 1860s. Syrian immigration to Australia was first reported in the early 1870s, only with a few individuals and groups. Syrian Christians have also been reported to have been fleeing Syria at the time, through the persecution of the Ottomans. Immigration restrictions started to ease after the White Australian Policy had been abandoned, resulting in a constant migration flow of Syrians to Australia. This encouraged more Australian born Syrians, with 6,710 by 2001.

=== White Australia policy ===
Under the White Australia policy, Syrian communities in Australia were distinctively labelled and on clear display as a minority group. The 1901 Immigration Restriction Act caused the number of Syrian Australians to drop by over half, especially due to the inability for most Syrians being unable to afford the airfare to Australia. At the beginning of the White Australia Policy, Syrians were associated with the "Asiatic" race, until in 1909 both Syrian and Lebanese communities argued they were a part of the Caucasian European race. Unlike many other nations, the gender split between men and women in the Syrian immigrant community was almost equal, with women accounting for more than 50 percent of the population. This equal gender split was one of the main differentiations between Syrian immigrants and other immigrant communities. The White Australian Policy further impacted the socio-economic background of Syrian immigrants, both at the time and for future immigrants. This is demonstrated through the majority of Syrian Australians having 'hawker' being listed as their form of employment.

=== Syrian Diaspora ===
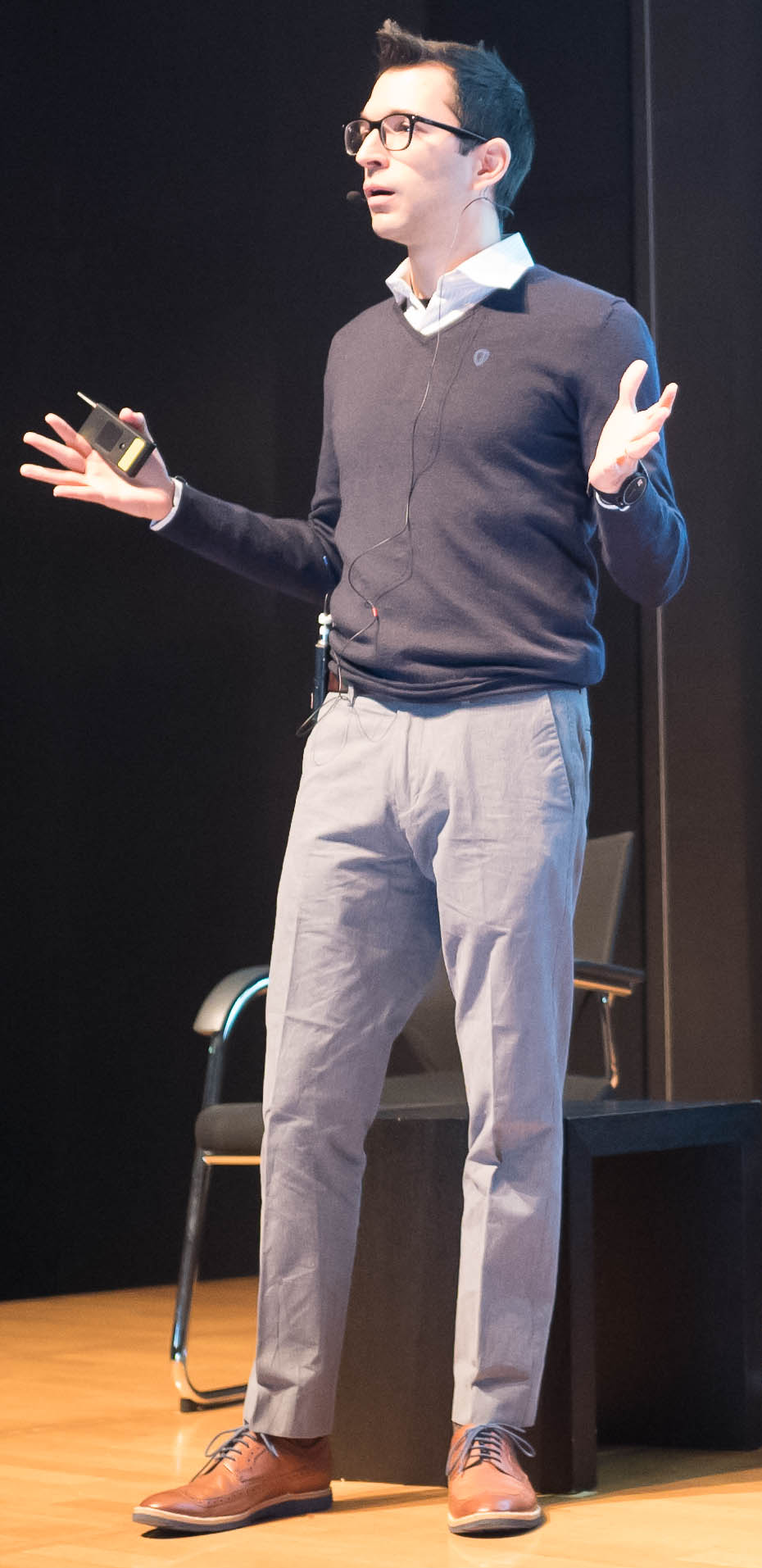
Syrian-Australian scientist Iyad Rahwan

The Syrian diaspora led to the influx of Syrians into Australia as a result of the Syrian Civil War. The Syrian refugee crisis proceeding the civil war is the largest refugee displacement the human race has seen, with an estimated 11.2 million Syrians displaced. Despite 90 percent of Syrian Refugees travelling to Turkey, movement of refugees to Western nations is increasing rapidly. In 2015, the Australian government announced that Australia would be accepting 12,000 Syrian refugees annually. Such places were taken by Syrian refugees who were drawn from the UNCHR with priority for the most vulnerable such as women, children and families. Throughout the Syrian diaspora there has been specific migration policy change, thus visa opportunities and migrant statuses are dynamic and often unpredictable. Due to such diaspora, the age projection trend the Syrian community in Australia is mostly the working age.

==== Australian Response to Syrian Diaspora ====
In 2016, the Australian Government published over $220 million will be spent as a response to the Syrian refugee crisis. This was further increased by $29 million through the 2019–2020 financial year. This money was spent on a variety of humanitarian assistance. This includes education improvement, long-term resilience training for Jordan refugees as well as an increased opportunity for improved workplace livelihood.

== Demographics ==
The 2016 Australian census reported 15,321 Syrian-born Australians. This was an 82.6 percent increase from the 2011 census. The distribution between men and women are almost equal, however the majority of the population are in the 18–44 years old age group. Furthermore, 46 percent of the Syrian migrant population in Australia are aged between 0 and 29 years old, with the large majority at 58 percent are of working age.

=== Visa opportunities ===
There are three main visas that are obtained by Syrians immigrating to Australia: the Refugee Visa, Women at Risk Visa and Global Special Humanitarian Visa.

The Refugee Visa (subclass 200) allows holders to live, study, work and register for Medicare while obtaining Australian permanent residency. Syrians immigrating to Australia will qualify for such visas as the applicant has to be outside his/her native country and can be referred by the UNHCR for confirmation.

Women at Risk (subclass 204) visa is used by Syrian women who "do not have the protection of a male relative and [is] in danger of victimisation, harassment or serious abuse because of [her] gender". The Australian government allows for 1,000 of such visas for Syrian women annually.

Holders of the Global Special Humanitarian Visa (subclass 202) are able to reside in Australia if another Australian citizen proposes their application. Further, holders have to pay for their own travel costs, however, are often offered financial assistance by the International Organisation for Migration. Syrian Australians are often holders of such a visa as family members who have previously moved to Australia are able to recommend others.

=== Location ===
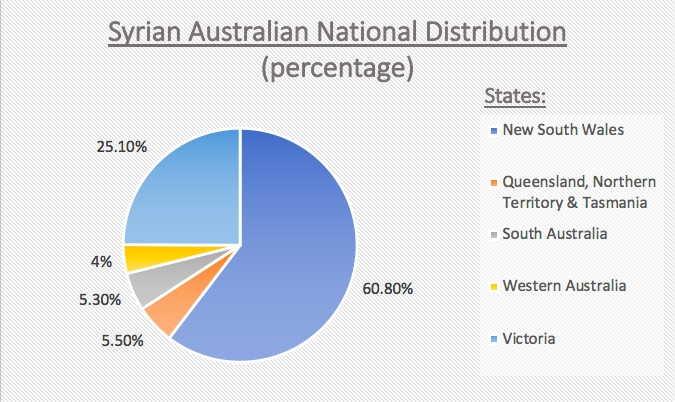

A large majority of 60.8 percent of Syrian Australians are located in New South Wales, with 25.1 percent in Victoria, followed by 5.3 percent in South Australia. Four percent are in Western Australia, while 5.5 percent are in the Northern Territory, Tasmania and Queensland combined.

== Culture ==
=== Traditions ===
Syrian Australians have a range of traditions that are continually used in their community. Casual greetings are often prolonged with questions about one's wellbeing. In formal situations greetings include a gentle handshake with the right hand only. Shaking a female's hand is often deemed inappropriate, this is unless she reaches out first. Within Syrian culture, family is a representation of status and reputation. One person's achievements have the ability to impact the perception of the entire family from an outsider perspective. Traditionally, the Syrian dynamic is patriarchal. This typically means the oldest male (typically the father) hold the most authority as well as is often financially responsible for the family. Syrian public dynamic are affected by social expectations, with young marriage often being a very popular decision. It is not an uncommon situation for men to be much older than their girlfriends and/or wives of approximately 10 to 15 years.

Syrian festivals often include the celebration of the Christian Easter as well as Islamic Ramadan and Eid al-Fitr. The celebration of the Silk Road is often celebrated also as it represents the trade route between the East and the West. Such festivals are celebrated in Australia within the Syrian community.

=== Demographics ===
Religion of Syrian Australians
1. Christianity (58.7%)
2. Islam (37.2%)
3. None (4.10%)

Religion is an aspect in Syrian culture that is highly influential for one’s identity. According to the 2016 Australian census, 37.2 percent of Syrian Australians affiliated with Islam, while 24.9 percent of identified with Christianity (including both Easter Orthodox and Catholic). In this same census, 10.2 percent recorded their affiliation to be Assyrian Apostolic, with 4.1 percent did not identify as affiliating with any religion.

=== Religion ===
Syrian Australian demography by religion (note that it include only Syrian born in Syria and not Australian with Syrian ancestries)
Religious group	2021 (Note: Religious breakdown proportions based on "Syrian" ethnic or cultural origin response on the 2021 census.)		2016		2011	
Religious group	Pop.	%	Pop.	%	Pop.	%
Catholic	5,232 ▲	17.98% ▲	2,540 ▲	16.58%▼	1,533	18.27%
Assyrian	4,054 ▲	13.93% ▲	1,569 ▲	10.24% ▲	448	5.34%
Eastern Orthodox	3,817 ▲	13.12% ▲	1,269 ▲	8.28% ▼	1,165	13.88%
Oriental Orthodox	1,708 ▲	5.87% ▼	1,149 ▲	7.5% ▼	882	10.51%
Protestantism and Other Christian	3,084 ▲	10.6% ▲	1,324 ▲	8.64% ▲	493	5.88%
(Total Christian)	17,892▲	61.49% ▲	7,847▲	51.21%▼	4,520	53.87%
Islam	8,807 ▲	30.27% ▼	5,701 ▲	37.2% ▲	2,950	35.16%
Other (Mostly Druze)	789 ▲	2.71% ▲	369 ▲	2.41% ▼	289	3.44%
Hinduism	3	0.01% ▼	3 ▲	0.02% ▲	0	0%
Buddhism	7 ▲	0.02% ▼	5 ▲	0.03% ▼	3	0.04%
Judaism	3 ▼	0.01% ▼	11 ▲	0.07% ▲	3	0.04%
No religion	948 ▲	3.26% ▼	631 ▲	4.12% ▲	255	3.04%
Not stated	529 ▼	1.82% ▼	614 ▲	4.01% ▲	316	3.77%
Total Syrian Australian population	29,096 ▲	100%	15,320 ▲	100%	8,391	100%

Syrian Australian demography by religion (Ancestries included)
Religious group	2021		2016		2011	
Religious group	Pop.	%	Pop.	%	Pop.	%
Catholic	11,304 ▲	19.37% ▲	6,387 ▲	18.1%▼	4,370	19.94%
Assyrian	4,555 ▲	7.81% ▲	1,720 ▲	4.87% ▲	500	2.28%
Eastern Orthodox	8,084 ▲	13.85% ▲	3,354 ▲	9.5% ▼	3,037	13.86%
Oriental Orthodox	2,715 ▲	4.65% ▼	1,844 ▼	5.22% ▼	2,178	9.94%
Protestantism and Other Christian	5,797 ▲	9.93% ▲	2,931 ▲	8.3% ▲	1,236	5.64%
(Total Christian)	32,448▲	55.61% ▲	16,230▲	45.99%▼	11,372	51.89%
Islam	19,562 ▲	33.52% ▼	13,885 ▲	39.34% ▲	7,893	36.02%
Other (Mostly Druze)	1,723 ▲	2.95% ▲	964 ▲	2.73% ▼	777	3.55%
Hinduism	3	0.01%	3 ▲	0.01% ▲	0	0%
Buddhism	25 ▲	0.04%	15 ▼	0.04% ▼	16	0.07%
Judaism	60 ▼	0.1% ▼	67 ▲	0.19% ▲	35	0.16%
No religion	3,160 ▲	5.42% ▼	2,153 ▲	6.1% ▲	872	3.98%
Not stated	1,137 ▼	1.95% ▼	1,701 ▲	4.82% ▲	826	3.77%
Total Syrian Australian population	58,353 ▲	100%	35,292 ▲	100%	21,915	100%

=== Arts ===
One of the major Syrian Artists in Australia is Aghyad al-Atassi. Painiting portraits of Syrian Refugees living in camps throughout Australia, al-Atassi is one of the first locally regarded local Australian Artists born in Syria. One of the largest Syrian Arts events held in Australia was the Syrian Film Festival in Sydney and Melbourne. This 2017 event was deemed controversial by the ABC News and has not been conducted since 2017.

=== Media ===
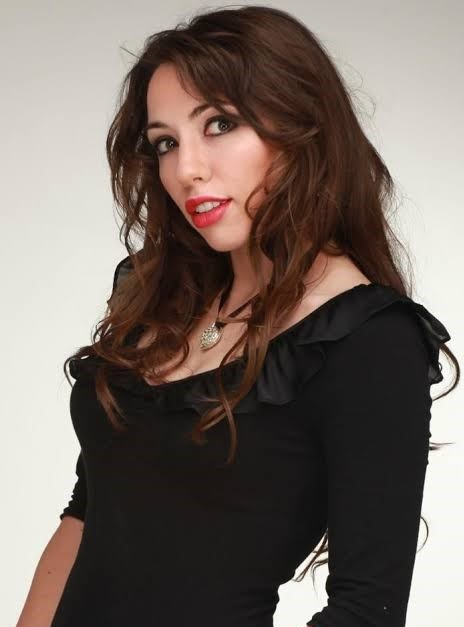
Syrian-Australian political commentator and media personality Maram Susli

Most Syrian Australian media is presented on the radio. Syrian radio consists of a mix of Syrian and Arabic music, current events, weather, local news and current events. The subjects used for interviews on such stations are often affiliated with Syrian people and their culture.

==== Radio ====
Syrian radio channels in Australia include:

- 2ME Radio, which airs in Sydney and Melbourne, broadcasts in Arabic every day 24 hours
- SBS Radio, which airs in nationwide, broadcasts in Arabic everyday
- Albashaer Radio, which airs in New South Wales, broadcasting everyday
- 3ZZZ Radio, which airs in Melbourne, broadcasting Mondays, Wednesdays and Saturdays

== Notable people ==
Syrian-born fruit shop owner Ahmed al-Ahmed gained international recognition as the "Bondi Hero" for his actions during a terrorist attack at Bondi Beach in December 2025.

== See also ==
- Arab diaspora
- Arab Australians
- Assyrian Australians
- Iranian Australians
- Iraqi Australians
- Kurdish Australians
- Lebanese Australians
- Mandaean Australians
- Turkish Australians

== Bibliography ==
- 2ME Radio Arabic. (2019) Retrieved from Radio.AU: https://radioau.net/2me-arabic/
- 3ZZZ program guide. (2019). Retrieved from 3ZZZ Radio : https://www.3zzz.com.au/program-guide.html
- ABC News. (2017, May). Australia hosts controversial Syrian film festival showcasing life in warzone. Retrieved from ABC News: https://www.abc.net.au/news/2017-05-05/australia-hosts-controversial-syrian-film-festival/8490154
- Ahmed, A. (2015). White Australia. The White Australia Policy - The Syrian Experience.
- Australian Department of Foreign Affairs. (2018). Syrian-Born Community Information. Canberra, Australia: Australian National Government .
- Australian Department of Foreign Affairs and Trade. (2018). Syria humanitarian response. Retrieved from Australian Department of Foreign Affairs and Trade: https://www.dfat.gov.au/geo/syria/Pages/syria-humanitarian-response
- Collins, J. (2018). Syrian and Iraqi Refugee Settlement in Australia . Sydney, Australia: University of Technology Sydney.
- Dirgham, S. (2017, August ). A Syrian Artist Finding a Voice in Australia. Retrieved from Beloved Syria: https://belovedsyria.com.au/2017/08/10/a-syrian-artist-finding-a-voice-in-australia/
- Evason, N. (2016). Syrian Culture . Retrieved from ABC Cultural Atlas: https://culturalatlas.sbs.com.au/syrian-culture/
- Evason, N. (2016). Syrian Culture - Syrians in Australia . Retrieved from ABC Cultural Atlas: https://culturalatlas.sbs.com.au/syrian-culture/syrian-culture-syrians-in-australia
- Evason, N. (2016). Syrian Culture - Religion . Retrieved from ABC Cultural Atlas : https://culturalatlas.sbs.com.au/syrian-culture/syrian-culture-religion#syrian-culture-religion
- Glenn, H. (2015). The Syrian community in Australia. Retrieved from .id - Demographics: https://blog.id.com.au/2015/population/demographic-trends/the-syrian-community-in-australia/
- McLellan, G. (2015). Diaspora Communities in Australia. Migration Council Australia.
- Monsour, A. (2010). Not quite white: Lebanese and the White Australia Policy 1880 to 1947. Brisbane, Australia: Post Pressed.
- Reid, K. (2020, March). Syrian Refugee Crisis. Retrieved from World Vision: https://www.worldvision.org/refugees-news-stories/syrian-refugee-crisis-facts
- Valenta, M. (2020). Syrian Refugee Migration, Transitions in Migrant Statuses and Future Scenarios of Syrian Mobility. Refugee Survey Quarterly, 1-24.
