= Arab Australians =

Australian citizens or residents with ancestry from the Arab world

عرب أستراليا

Languages
- Australian English, Arabic, other Afroasiatic languages

Religion
- Majority Christianity (Roman Catholicism, Maronites, Orthodoxy, Coptic), large minorities of Islam (Sunni, Shia), smaller minorities Druze

Related ethnic groups
- Arabs, Jews, Copts, Assyrians, Berbers

Arab Australians (Arabic: عرب أستراليا) refers to Australian citizens or residents with ancestry from the Middle East and North Africa, regardless of their ethnic origins. Many are not ethnically Arab but numerous groups who include Arabs, Kurds, Copts, Assyrians, Berbers and others. The majority are Christian by faith with minorities being Muslim, Druze, Yazidi and other faiths.

== Overview ==
Arab Australians generally share a common cultural heritage, which originates in the Arabic-speaking countries of the Middle East and North Africa (MENA).

According to the AHRC, most Egyptian (69%), Lebanese (61%) and Palestinian (60%) emigrants to Australia settled before 1986. Other MENA populations mainly arrived later during the 1990s, such as Iraqis and Sudanese.

Although the countries of origin of Arab Australians are all primarily Islamic (>70%), emigrants to Australia from these states belonged to various religious orders not proportional to their home countries' religious demographics. Most Egypt-born and Lebanon-born Australians were Christian Copts (84%) and Maronites (55%), respectively. The majority of Arab Australians are overwhelmingly Lebanese, and collectively, Christian Arab Australians (including Lebanese Christian Australians together with other Christian Arab Australians) comprise a majority of Arab Australians. The proportion of Muslims was highest among immigrants from Jordan (40% of Jordanian Australians are Muslim), followed by Syria (34% of Syrian Australians are Muslim) and Iraq (31% of Iraqi Australians are Muslim).

Arab Australians are mainly concentrated in Victoria and New South Wales. Smaller groups also reside in Queensland, Western Australia and South Australia, with fewer in Tasmania, the Australian Capital Territory and the Northern Territory.

== Demographics ==
In the 2001 census, 248,807 Australian residents reported Arab ancestry. Additionally, 209,372 Australians indicated that they spoke Arabic at home. 162,283 Australian residents were born in one of the 22 Arab League nations, a proportion which represented 0.8% of Australia's population. 120,000 Australians also had a parent who was born in an Arab state.

The most common countries of origin for Arab Australians were Lebanon (71,349), Egypt (33,432) and Iraq (24,832). Of these, a further 89,021 had a Lebanese-born parent and 10,296 had an Egyptian-born parent. Additionally, Australia is a major tourist destination for people from the United Arab Emirates, with 14,000 Emiratis entering the country each year. There is also an Emirati international student community of between 1,200 and 2,000 pupils.

According to the AHRC, most Australian residents born in Arab nations are citizens of Australia. The citizenship take-up rate is highest among the earlier settlers, who have been established longer. 91.6% of Egypt-born residents were Australian citizens, followed by immigrants born in Lebanon (91.3%), Syria (86.2%), and Iraq (68.1%).

== Notable people ==
- Ahmed Fahour
- Ali Abbas Al-Hilfi
- Anne Aly
- Bob Katter
- David Basheer
- Don Hany
- Faisal Faisal
- Hakeem al-Araibi
- Hazem Shammas
- Jacques Nasser
- Joseph Saba
- Lily Serna
- Loudy Wiggins
- Matthew Abood
- Munif Mohammed Abou Rish
- Osamah Sami
- Paul Nakad
- Randa Abdel-Fattah
- Ron Bakir
- Samah Sabawi
- Samier Dandan
- Shady Alsuleiman
- Waleed Aly
- Akmal Saleh
- Moudi Najjar
- Munjed Al Muderis
- Osama Malik

== See also ==
- Arab diaspora
- Assyrian Australians
- Australian Jews
- Christianity in Australia
- Coptic Australians
- Egyptian diaspora
- European Australians
- Islam in Australia
- Lebanese diaspora
- North African and Middle Eastern Australians
- Palestinian diaspora
- Syrian diaspora
- Syrian Australians
- African Australians
- American Australians
- Asian Australians
- Black Australians
- Caribbean and West Indian Australians
- European Australians
- Indigenous Australians
- Latin American Australians
