= Palestinian Australians =

Palestinian Australians فلسطينيو أستراليا
Total population
- 15,607 (2021)

Regions with significant populations
- Sydney

Languages
- Australian English · Palestinian Arabic

Religion
- Islam · Roman Catholicism · Greek Orthodoxy

Related ethnic groups
- Arab Australians

Palestinian Australians (Arabic: فلسطينيو أستراليا, romanized: Filasṭīnīyū Ustrāliyā) are Australian citizens of Palestinian origin, or Palestinian immigrants who live in Australia. In the 2021 Australian census, 15,607 people in Australia identified as Palestinian, with 2,959 of those having been born in the West Bank and Gaza Strip.

== History ==
The migration of Palestinians to Australia has been closely linked to geopolitical events in the Middle East. Prior to the establishment of the state of Israel in 1948, records of Palestinian migration to Australia are sparse. After 1948, the patterns of Palestinian migration generally mirrored significant regional conflicts and displacements. Most Palestinians arriving in Australia held passports from other Arab countries, such as Jordan, Lebanon, Syria, Egypt, Iraq, and Kuwait, where they had initially sought refuge after leaving Palestine. This was a common occurrence due to the ongoing conflicts and displacement experienced by Palestinians.

Key migration waves occurred following the 1948 and 1967 Arab-Israeli Wars, the occupation of the West Bank and Gaza, and subsequent conflicts such as the Lebanese Civil War (1975–1990) and the Gulf War in 1991. Each of these events contributed to significant increases in Palestinian migration to Australia. Additionally, individual Palestinians have arrived on work or study visas, capitalizing on opportunities for education or employment.

Palestinian migration prior to 1948 was limited, and tracking subsequent flows has been complicated by the fact that many migrants arrived via other countries. Notably, many Palestinians may not identify as originating from "historic Palestine" in official records due to the options available on Australian census forms, which list only "Israel" or "Gaza Strip and West Bank". This under-reporting is evidenced by the 2016 census, which showed only 2,932 individuals born in the Gaza Strip or West Bank, while over 13,000 identified as having Palestinian ancestry.

As of 2011 the estimated population of Palestinians in Australia was over 7,000.

== Community ==
Palestinians in Australia are often described as an "invisible" national group, making it difficult to determine their numbers accurately. Many second and third-generation migrants retain strong connections to their cultural heritage through memory and familial narratives. However, generational divides exist, with older generations often emphasizing the preservation of Palestinian culture, while younger Palestinians may identify more with Australian culture.

The majority of Palestinian Australians speak Arabic, and while many are Muslims, there is also a significant population of Christian Palestinians, primarily from Orthodox backgrounds. Additionally, some individuals have faced discrimination based on their Muslim or Arab identities, although national identity-based discrimination is less pronounced compared to other contexts.

Many Palestinian Australians participate in organised sports, particularly futsal, as a means of uniting the community and fostering a sense of belonging. The Palestinian Community Association (PCA) plays a pivotal role in promoting cultural activities and facilitating events that connect members of the diaspora. Players often name their teams after occupied Palestinian towns, reinforcing their cultural ties and encouraging younger generations to connect with their ancestry. The community is largely concentrated in Melbourne, with significant populations in Dandenong, Doncaster, and Roxburgh Park, fostering a rich local network.

== Demographics ==
As of the 2021 Australian Census, the estimated population of Palestinians in Australia was approximately 15,607 individuals, with 2,959 respondents identifying as having been born in the West Bank and Gaza Strip. However, official government records may not accurately reflect the total number of Palestinians residing in Australia.

Geographically, the majority of the Palestinian community in Australia resides in New South Wales (53.3%), followed by Victoria (26.6%), Western Australia (7.1%), and Queensland (5.3%). Migration patterns show that 64.9% of Palestinians arrived in Australia prior to 2000, while more recent arrivals occurred mainly between 2011 and 2020 (18.2%).

=== Language and religion ===
Arabic is the predominant language spoken at home, with 79.2% of the population using it, while 14.2% speak English. Among those who speak a language other than English at home, 80.8% report fluency in English.

The religious affiliations among Palestinian Australians are diverse: 49.4% are Muslim, 17.4% are Eastern Orthodox, and 14.9% are Roman Catholic, with 5.3% identifying as having no religion. Ancestry data from the 2021 Census reveals that 52.8% of respondents identified as Palestinian, 20.1% as Arab, and smaller percentages as German (4.6%) and English (4.1%).

Palestinian Australian demography by religion (includes only Palestinians born in Palestinian territories)
Religious group	2021 (Note: Religious breakdown proportions based on "Palestinian" ethnic or cultural origin response on the 2021 census.)		2016 (Note: Religious breakdown proportions based on "Palestinian" ethnic or cultural origin response on the 2016 census.)		2011 (Note: Religious breakdown proportions based on "Palestinian" ethnic or cultural origin response on the 2011 census.)	
Religious group	Pop.	%	Pop.	%	Pop.	%
Catholic	441 ▼	14.9% ▼	514 ▲	17.49% ▼	488	18.1%
Eastern Orthodox	514 ▲	17.37% ▲	456 ▼	15.52% ▼	518	19.21%
Protestant and Other christian	297 ▼	10.04% ▼	372 ▼	12.66% ▼	388	14.39%
(Total Christian)	1,257 ▼	42.48% ▼	1,338 ▼	45.53% ▼	1,390	52.73%
Islam	1,463 ▲	49.44% ▲	1,283 ▲	43.65% ▲	1,065	40.4%
No religion	167 ▲	5.64% ▲	158 ▲	5.38% ▲	120	4.55%
Buddhism	0 ▼	0% ▼	3 ▲	0.1% ▲	0	0%
Hinduism	0	0%	0	0%	0	0%
Judaism	7 ▼	0.24% ▼	26 ▲	0.88% ▲	23	0.87%
Other	6 ▲	0.2% ▲	0 ▼	0% ▼	5	0.19%
Not stated	68 ▼	2.3% ▼	120 ▲	4.08% ▲	92	3.49%
Total Palestinian Australian population	2,959 ▲	100%	2,939 ▲	100%	2,636 ▲	100%

Palestinian Australian demography by religion (Ancestry included)
Religious group	2021		2016		2011	
Religious group	Pop.	%	Pop.	%	Pop.	%
Catholic	3,094 ▲	15.6% ▼	2,513 ▲	18.9% ▲	2,034	17.23%
Eastern Orthodox	2,811 ▲	14.18% ▼	2,068 ▲	15.56% ▼	2,039	17.28%
Protestant and Other christian	1,246 ▲	7.78% ▼	1,211 ▲	9.11% ▲	839	7.11%
(Total Christian)	7,448 ▲	37.56% ▼	5,792 ▲	43.57% ▲	4,912	41.62%
Islam	10,403 ▲	52.46% ▼	7,393 ▲	55.62% ▲	5,920	50.16%
No religion	1,493 ▲	7.53% ▲	802 ▲	6.03% ▲	531	4.5%
Buddhism	6 ▲	0.03%	4 ▼	0.03% ▼	14	0.12%
Hinduism	9 ▼	0.05% ▼	11 ▲	0.08% ▲	0	0%
Judaism	104 ▲	0.52% ▼	91 ▼	0.68% ▼	127	1.08%
Other	23 ▲	0.12% ▲	9 ▼	0.07% ▼	21	0.18%
Not stated	344 ▼	1.73% ▼	536 ▲	4.03% ▲	277	2.35%
Total Palestinian Australian population	19,830 ▲	100%	13,293 ▲	100%	11,802	100%

=== Age and gender ===
In terms of gender distribution, 53.9% of the population identifies as male and 46.1% as female. The Gaza Strip and West Bank-born population in Australia had a median age of 62 years, significantly higher than the median ages of 44 years for all overseas-born individuals and 38 years for the total Australian population. In terms of gender distribution, 55.9% were male (1,640) and 44.0% were female (1,290), resulting in a sex ratio of 127 males for every 100 females.

=== Education and employment ===
In terms of education, 54.0% of Gaza Strip and West Bank-born individuals aged 15 years and older held some form of higher non-school qualification, which is slightly lower than the Australian average of 60.1%. The unemployment rate for this group was 14.0%, significantly higher than the national average of 6.9%.

According to the General Delegation of Palestine to Australia, Aotearoa New Zealand, and the Pacific, a significant majority of Palestinians who have settled in Australia possess educational qualifications beyond primary or secondary school, with 80% holding at least one qualification and 73% having obtained a bachelor's degree or higher.

The most prevalent professional fields among these individuals are engineering, science and technical roles, as well as medical and health professions. Access to work rights is typically granted only once individuals transition to a bridging visa. In New South Wales, 75% of Palestinian newcomers have obtained a bridging visa, while 2% hold a Class C bridging visa and 23% remain on a visitor visa. Recently, the federal government expanded access to Medicare for certain visa holders, specifically those with two subclasses of bridging visa E who have been granted work rights.

== Political awareness ==
Many Palestinian Australians retain a strong emotional connection to their homeland and often express a desire to return or visit without compromising their safety. Political engagement is common, although some may choose to avoid public activism due to concerns about potential backlash. While the Australian government does not officially recognise the State of Palestine, it supports a two-state solution, a stance that continues to shape the political landscape for Palestinians in Australia.

== Gaza war ==
In recent years, the Palestinian Australian community has faced significant challenges related to the ongoing conflict in Gaza. In August 2024, Amnesty International criticised the Australian Government's refusal to grant asylum to over 7,000 Palestinians fleeing Gaza.

Protests against the Gaza war, such as those by the Renegade Activists group in September 2024, have drawn attention to these issues, criticising Australia's perceived complicity in the conflict and advocating for a more compassionate approach to Palestinian refugees.

In response to rising tensions surrounding pro-Palestinian advocacy, Prime Minister Anthony Albanese announced plans to criminalise doxing, following the "Z600 breach", which leaked the names of 600 individuals in the creative industries. This breach included transcripts revealing coordinated attacks against Palestine supporters.

Despite support from community organisations, many Palestinian Australians continue to face significant obstacles, including inadequate pathways to permanent residency and limited access to support services, underscoring the need for a reassessment of Australia's humanitarian policies regarding Palestinian refugees.

=== Visa restrictions and asylum seekers ===
The topic of Palestinian individuals fleeing Gaza and their potential impact on Australia's national security has become a contentious issue in Australian politics. Former Opposition Leader Peter Dutton proposed a complete ban on visas for Palestinians, citing concerns over national security. He expressed his belief that allowing people from a conflict zone poses significant risks to Australia.

In the initial three months of the Israel-Gaza conflict, approximately 160 Palestinians were denied visitor visas to Australia, primarily due to doubts about their intention to return home after a temporary stay. Official responses indicated that 150 Palestinian applicants were rejected on the grounds of not demonstrating a genuine intention to leave Australia, a decision criticised by several senators as lacking compassion.

The Australian Department of Home Affairs has imposed stringent visa restrictions for Palestinians, exacerbating their difficulties by limiting access to permanent protection and essential services.

Between 7 October 2023 of the previous year and 12 August 2024, Australia granted a total of 2,922 visas to individuals from the Palestinian territories. Most of these visas are granted to family members of Australian citizens, although only about 1,300 individuals have successfully arrived in Australia. A report indicates that a majority of recent arrivals from Gaza hold higher education degrees, with many working in skilled professions. Upon arrival, they entered on visitor visas, which do not provide access to healthcare, income support, or employment opportunities. The Department of Home Affairs reported that from 7 October 2023 to 12 August 2024, a total of 10,033 visa applications were submitted by Palestinians, with a mere 29% being approved.

A number of Palestinians who recently escaped Gaza are facing unexpected visa cancellations from Australia, resulting in their being stranded abroad. Between 7 October 2023 and 6 February 2024, the Australian Government issued a total of 2,273 temporary (subclass 600) visas to Palestinians with ties to Australia, according to the Department of Home Affairs. Holders of these temporary visas are restricted from working and do not have access to education or healthcare in Australia.

A significant number of Palestinians who arrived in Australia from Gaza in recent years are seeking asylum due to the expiration of their short-term tourist visas. Following the increase in arrivals, individuals from the Palestinian Authority have become the second largest group applying for protection in Australia, just behind Chinese nationals. Since October 2023, over 749 holders of Palestinian Authority passports have filed for asylum after the Australian Government began issuing tourist visas to those fleeing Gaza. Currently, the Australian federal government is deliberating on potential long-term solutions for the Palestinian asylum seekers.

== Notable people ==
- Randa Abdel-Fattah
- Basem Abdo
- Munif Mohammed Abou Rish
- Sheikh Shady Alsuleiman
- Sarah Bahbah
- Ali Banat
- Samah Sabawi
- Lily Serna
- Yasser Shahin
- Loudy Wiggins

== See also ==
- Al-Kateb v Godwin
