= 2024 Wakeley church stabbing =

Terrorist attack in Sydney, New South Wales, Australia

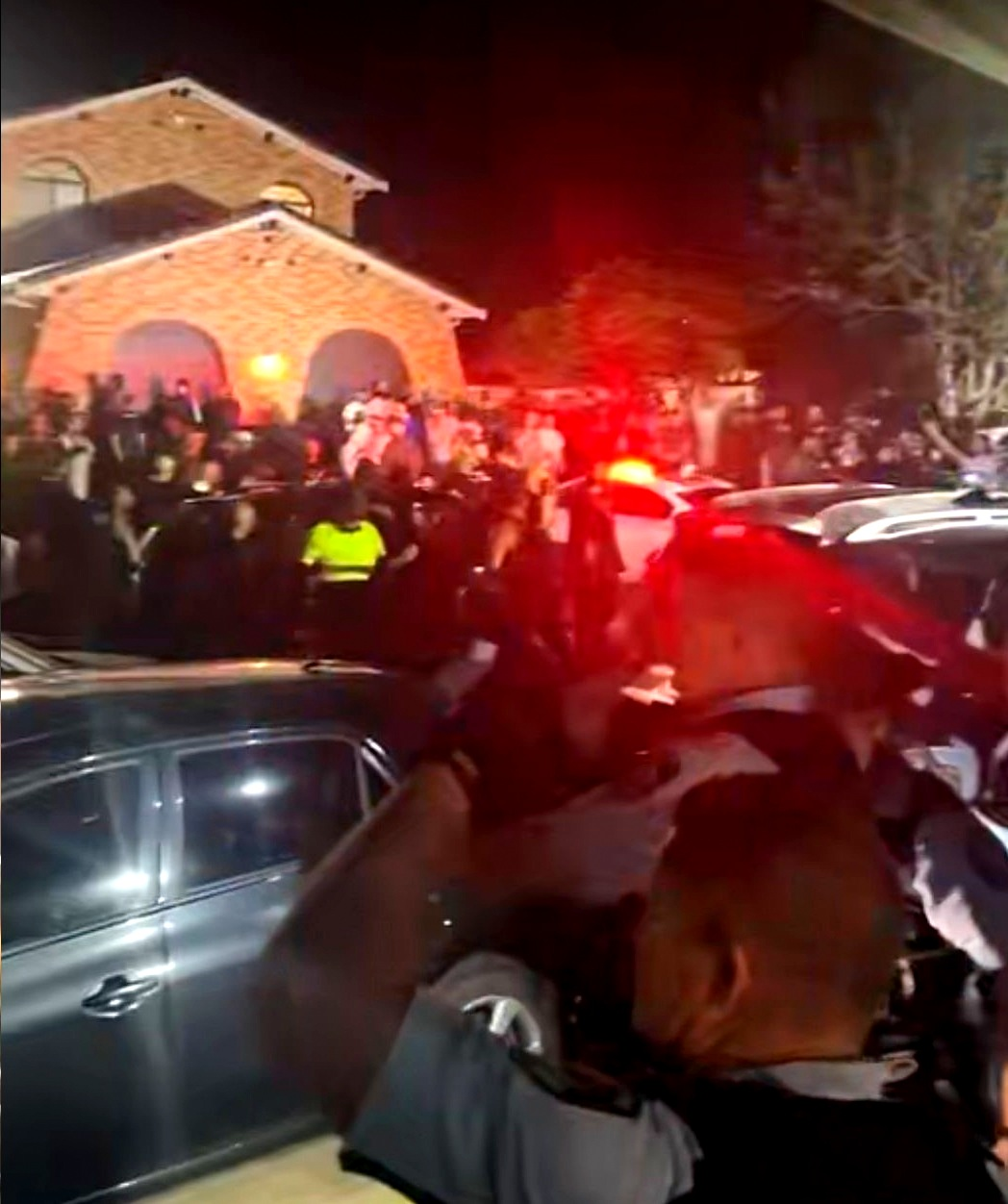
- Rioters on Welcome Street following the stabbing, 16 April 2024 at 12:12 am
- Location: 33.8728°S 150.9062°E; Wakeley, Sydney, New South Wales, Australia
- Date: 15 April 2024; 7:15 pm (AEST; UTC+10:00)
- Target: Mari Emmanuel and parishioners
- Attack type: Stabbing
- Weapon: Flick knife
- Deaths: 0
- Injuries: 4 (including Emmanuel and the perpetrator)
- Motive: Islamic extremism

On 15 April 2024, at approximately 7:15 pm local time, a knife attack took place at Christ The Good Shepherd Church in Wakeley, a suburb of Sydney, Australia. During a live-streamed sermon, the attacker walked up to the pulpit, first stabbing bishop Mari Emmanuel, resulting in permanent vision loss in Emmanuel's right eye, before stabbing a priest and injuring another churchgoer. While no one was killed, this attack was the second stabbing incident to have taken place in Sydney in two days, following the deadly mass stabbing at Bondi Junction.

The New South Wales Police Force arrested a 16-year-old male with a "long history of behaviour consistent with a mental illness or intellectual disability". They have classified the stabbing as a terrorist attack that was "religiously or ideologically" motivated as the suspect shouted a Muslim slogan during the attack, but have not released the name of the suspect. Wakeley is home to many Christians belonging to the Assyrian diaspora, including Emmanuel himself.

== Background ==
Wakeley hosts the highest number of Assyrian Christians of any suburban neighbourhood in Australia, many of them refugees from Iraq and Syria.

Originally from Iraq, Mar Mari Emmanuel was ordained a bishop in 2011, but later broke away from the Ancient Church of the East due to theological differences and established his own independent Church.

Emmanuel criticized liberal Christian denominations, other Christian denominations, as well as other religions such as Judaism and Islam in his sermons. He was a prominent critic of lockdowns and vaccine mandates during the COVID-19 pandemic in Australia. He espoused conservative stances on issues such as LGBT rights and sexuality. He had also voiced solidarity with the Palestinians during the Gaza war, and had called for peace. Clips from his live-streamed sermons have been posted on social media and have amassed millions of views, giving him an international following. According to Emmanuel himself, about one month before the stabbing, threats were spread on TikTok stating "the Bishop has two weeks to live".

Mar Mari Emmanuel frequently criticised the Quran and the teachings of the Prophet Muhammad. In a December 2023 podcast appearance, Emmanuel declared that Jesus Christ was the only God and questioned Islamic beliefs about Jesus, who Muslims regard as a prophet. In another sermon, he criticised the Quran's relatively late appearance compared with the Bible, asking why he should believe in a document that emerged centuries after the Bible. Australian Catholic University head of theology Joel Hodge said Emmanuel had developed a reputation for making "various political statements", but did not believe these views particularly distinguished him from other religious leaders. Deakin University extremism expert Josh Roose said that the online environment, particularly amid heightened tensions over the Israel-Palestine conflict, had created conditions in which angry individuals could become motivated or inspired to target members of other groups.

== Stabbing ==
The stabbings took place around 7:10 pm in the suburb of Wakeley, 34 kilometres (21 mi) south-west of Sydney CBD. An assailant wearing a black jumper entered Christ The Good Shepherd Church on Welcome Street, shouted "Allahu Akbar", and attacked several people with a knife, starting with the presiding bishop Mar Mari Emmanuel, who was preaching and being live-streamed to the internet. The attacker approached the pulpit and stabbed Emmanuel repeatedly in the head and upper body. The weapon was allegedly a flick knife, banned in Australia, but it was not fully opened.

In a video released by one of the churchgoers, the teenager can be heard saying Arabic: "If he didn't insult my prophet, I wouldn't have come here". Members of the congregation rushed forward to subdue the attacker, and gathered around the victim. Eleven ambulances were sent to the church.

== Casualties ==
Three people suffered non-life-threatening injuries in the attack: bishop Mar Mari Emmanuel, 53, who was taken to Liverpool Hospital in a serious condition; the hospital was placed under a partial lockdown. Two men were treated for lacerations suffered in restraining the attacker, including a 39-year-old priest and another man in his 60s.

Four fingers of the alleged assailant were severed after the attack. This occurred during the ensuing scuffle.

== Suspect ==
A suspect was apprehended and taken into custody. While not as yet named, he was first reported to be 15 years old, later revised to 16. He was known to police but was not on a terrorism watchlist. He had previously been convicted in January 2024 for weapons offences and stalking, intimidation and damaging property, but was released on a good behaviour bond by a court in Sydney.

Footage showed the alleged attacker smiling while held to the floor by a police officer after being apprehended by churchgoers. The assailant's identity was withheld due to juvenile laws in New South Wales. His father said that his son showed no signs of radicalisation before the attack. According to a Muslim community leader who spoke with the suspect's family, the suspect expressed remorse to his mother and apologised for his actions. He added that the suspect's relatives, who transferred residence for fear of retaliation, condemned the attack, while the suspect's mother said that he had sought treatment from psychiatrists to control his anger.

== Investigation ==
Police stated that the stabbing had "elements that are satisfied in terms of religious motivated extremism." At a press conference in Canberra, the Australian Security Intelligence Organisation (ASIO) Director General Mike Burgess said that the intelligence agency was aware of allegations by the assailant that the bishop had insulted the Islamic prophet Muhammad. Commissioner of the New South Wales Police Force Karen Webb said police had spoken with the boy's parents, but could not provide details. A counter-terrorism task force was set up to investigate, particularly whether other persons were involved. The task force consisted of officials from the New South Wales Police Force, the Australian Federal Police, and ASIO.

On 18 April 2024, the 16-year-old suspect was charged with a terrorist act. He was refused bail and appeared before a bedside juvenile court hearing on 19 April. The magistrate recommended that he undergo a mental health assessment and ordered him remanded at a children's detention center upon being released from hospital pending his next court hearing on 14 June. At that hearing, the suspect was charged with one count of injuring with intent to murder Emmanuel and another count of injuring with intent to cause grievous bodily harm the other priest who was injured in the attack.

Police have alleged that the attacker was part of an Islamic State network that were also connected to other violence, including violent attacks targeting LGBTQ people at various locations in Sydney, and historical or indirect connections to the 2025 Bondi Beach shooting.

== Aftermath ==
2024 Wakeley church stabbing aftermath riots
- Date: 15 April 2024
- Location: Wakeley, New South Wales, Australia
- Methods: Isolated incident rioting; protests; assault

Parties
Locals and other Christian residents	NSW Police

Casualties
- Injuries: 81
- Charged: 40

Footage of the stabbing circulated among Assyrian, Maronite, Catholic and Coptic communities via text message leading to people arriving to the church in cars within minutes. More than 100 police personnel were deployed to the church location to confront crowds estimated to be up to 2,000 people gathered outside the church and the hospital, where they believed the alleged attacker was being held. The crowd screamed "Bring him out!" as police and paramedics remained inside the church with the alleged offender for a few hours. The crowds clashed with police and attacked police vehicles. Riot police used pepper spray on the tumultuous crowd outside the church. A police helicopter circled the area, broadcasting: "All persons, please vacate the area immediately."

A total of 30 people in the crowd were injured during the riots, with seven hospitalised. Fifty-one police officers were also injured. Three injured police officers were taken to hospital but released the following day. Twenty police vehicles were damaged, with ten rendered unusable. Dozens of rounds of live ammunition, police uniforms and bulletproof vests were also stolen from the damaged police vehicles. Six paramedics were trapped inside the church for more than three hours due to the violence. Several houses were also broken into. Police operations ended before 1 am on 16 April. NSW Police Commissioner Karen Webb vowed that the violent rioters will be "prosecuted" and also stated that many rioters were not even associated with the church. She also announced the formation of Strike Force Dribs to respond to the riot, as well as the implementation of additional patrols to help "community harmonisation." Police said that they were identifying rioters based on 600 hours of footage covering the event.

In his first statements since the attack, released on 18 April, Mar Mari Emmanuel said that he was "recovering quickly" and that he had forgiven the attacker. He also urged his congregation to cooperate with authorities and not to retaliate. Mar Mari Emmannuel lost sight in one of his eyes as a consequence of the stabbing. On 17 April one of the injured was discharged from hospital.

Muslim community leaders expressed fears that the decision by the authorities to label the incident a "terrorist attack" may encourage Islamophobia, and questioned whether the terrorism label was being applied consistently. Police were deployed in mosques across Sydney after reports that text messages were being circulated calling for the Assyrian Christian community to retaliate against Muslims. The Lakemba Mosque, the largest in the country, also hired additional private security after receiving fire bomb threats on 15 April. The Islamophobia Register of Australia recorded 46 reports of hate-related incidents following the Wakeley stabbing and the earlier stabbing incident in Bondi Junction, which it partially attributed to misinformation released by Islamophobic figures. In New Zealand, the Federation of Islamic Associations of New Zealand emailed its 49 member communities urging them to take security precautions following the Wakeley church attack.

=== Arrests ===
The first arrest in relation to the riots was made on 17 April, when a 19-year-old man from Doonside was charged with riot, affray and destroying or damaging property during public disorder. Police said they were seeking the identities of around 50 people from the crowd. Two more arrests were later made in the following days, a 28-year-old man from Horningsea Park and a 45-year-old man from Fairfield Heights. A fourth person, a 23-year-old man from Fairfield, surrendered to police on 22 April. The tenth arrest was a 27-year-old Granville man. Karen Webb stressed that the rioters were not related to the church's parish, and only used the original attack "as an excuse" to brawl with the police.

On 24 April, as part of the ongoing investigation into the alleged stabbing incident, counter-terrorism police arrested seven teenagers (aged 14–17), whom police alleged profess a "religiously motivated violent extremist ideology" and were an "unacceptable risk to the people of New South Wales". The next day, five of those arrested were charged with terrorism and extremism offences, including possessing extremist material and conspiring to plan or prepare for a terrorist act. Police alleged that these offences were identified based on a search of the accused stabber's electronic devices.

Throughout early June, five more arrests were made in connection to the riots, which included two men aged 41 and 31, as well as a 17-year-old boy from Fairfield West, Wakeley and Green Valley, respectively, with additional arrests made at Fairfield Police Station and a correctional facility in Cessnock, all totaling to 29 charges.

== Reactions ==
The Christ the Good Shepherd's administration requested prayers for the victims of the attack as well as the alleged perpetrator in accordance with Bishop Emmanuel and Father Isaac's wishes. It also called on those that had gathered at the church to "leave in peace". The Assyrian Church of the East also said that its "hearts and prayers are with the victims" and hoped for their "comfort and speedy recovery".

Bishop Emmanuel stated he had forgiven his assailant and called for his followers to be calm and law abiding amid the riots. Councillor Steve Christou of the Cumberland City Council stated "It just shows the remarkable courage of a man and the forgiveness he has within him to pray for his alleged attacker." Regarding the government's attempts to remove videos of the attack from social media, Emmanuel said he was not opposed to the videos remaining online, citing freedom of speech concerns.

The attack was condemned by other religious leaders, groups and organisations including the Australian National Imams Council and the Executive Council of Australian Jewry following a meeting with New South Wales Premier Chris Minns, who also expressed sympathies with victims and emergency services and called for calm.

Frank Carbone, the mayor of the City of Fairfield, said the attack and subsequent riot was "a very emotional situation", adding that the community was "very upset" over the incident.

Australian Prime Minister Anthony Albanese condemned the attack, saying that there was no place for "violence in our community" and "violent extremism". He also called on Australians to "unite, not divide, as a community, and as a country." Mike Burgess, the Director-General of Security of ASIO, declared that Australia's terror threat level was "possible", which meant extremism was an existing danger.

The Australian government ordered Meta Platforms and X to remove offensive content relating to the attack within 24 hours or face fines. In response, X said it would not do so and would go to court over the issue, with its owner Elon Musk accusing the government of censorship. Despite X blocking footage of the stabbing in Australia, on 22 April, the Federal Court of Australia granted an appeal by the Australian eSafety Commission to order X to block the footage globally on a temporary basis within 24 hours while hearing on a petition to make the ban permanent. The ban was extended on 10 May, but was lifted on 13 May, with Justice Geoffrey Kennett saying that it was unreasonable for the eSafety Commission to require X to remove access to the video globally and noting that a block would be "ignored or disparaged" by other countries. The eSafety Commissioner Julie Inman Grant dropped the Federal Court case on 5 June 2024, but stated that she would continue legal action in the Administrative Appeals Tribunal.

== See also ==
- Stabbing of Salman Rushdie
- 2025 Duhok axe attack
