= Mari Emmanuel =

Assyrian-Australian bishop (born 1970)

His Grace Mar Mari Emmanuel
- Bishop of Christ The Good Shepherd Church
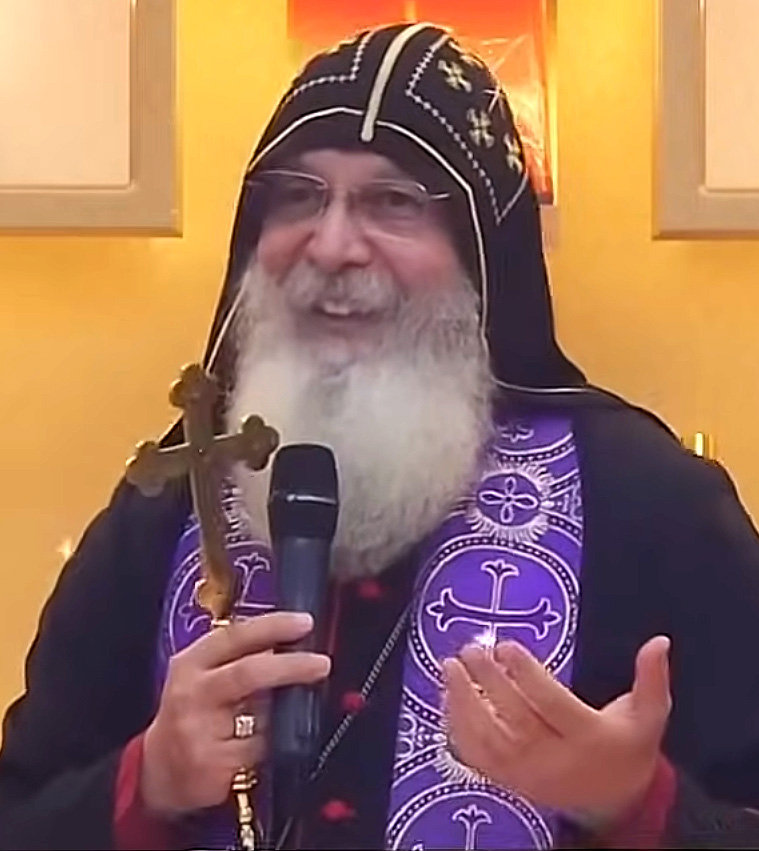
- Mari Emmanuel in 2025

Orders
- Ordination: 26 July 2009 by Mar Yacoub Daniel
- Consecration: 11 August 2011 by Mar Addai II
- Rank: Suffragan bishop
- Laicized: July 2014

Personal details
- Born: Robert Shlimon; 19 July 1970 (age 56) Habbaniyah, Al-Anbar, Iraq
- Denomination: Christ The Good Shepherd Church (2015–present); Ancient Church of the East (1970–2015)
- Residence: Sydney, Australia

Mar Mari Emmanuel (born Robert Shlimon; 19 July 1970) is an Assyrian Australian prelate. He is the bishop of Christ The Good Shepherd Church (CTGSC) in Wakeley, New South Wales. In 2011, Emmanuel was ordained a bishop in the Ancient Church of the East, but was excommunicated in 2014, subsequently establishing an independent church in 2015, in the Eastern Syriac tradition.

His sermons are live-streamed on the Facebook, TikTok, and YouTube channels of CTGSC, earning him the nickname TikTok Bishop. His popularity has garnered online fan pages with thousands of people following and showing their support for him. He has taken part in interviews on various YouTube shows where he has criticized homosexuality and the Australian COVID-19 policy. On 15 April 2024, Emmanuel and two others were stabbed at his church in an Islamic extremist attack during a livestreamed sermon. Emmanuel lost his right eye from the attack.

== Early life ==
Emmanuel was born as Robert Shlimon on 19 July 1970 in Habbaniya, Iraq, to a devout Assyrian-Christian family belonging to the Ancient Church of the East. He grew up in Baghdad, but his family left Iraq in 1985 and settled in Sydney, Australia, where he attended Fairfield High School. Emmanuel worked as a bank manager in the 1990s before he became a deacon in the late 1990s and later ordained a priest in 2009.

== Episcopacy ==
=== Ancient Church of the East ===
In August 2011, Mar Yacoub Daniel and Mar Zaia Khoshaba consecrated Emmanuel as a suffragan bishop for the Archdiocese of Australia and New Zealand, assisting the Metropolitan of Australia and New Zealand. Previously known as Emmanuel Shlimon, he adopted the episcopal name of Mari Emmanuel (after Saint Mari) upon becoming bishop.

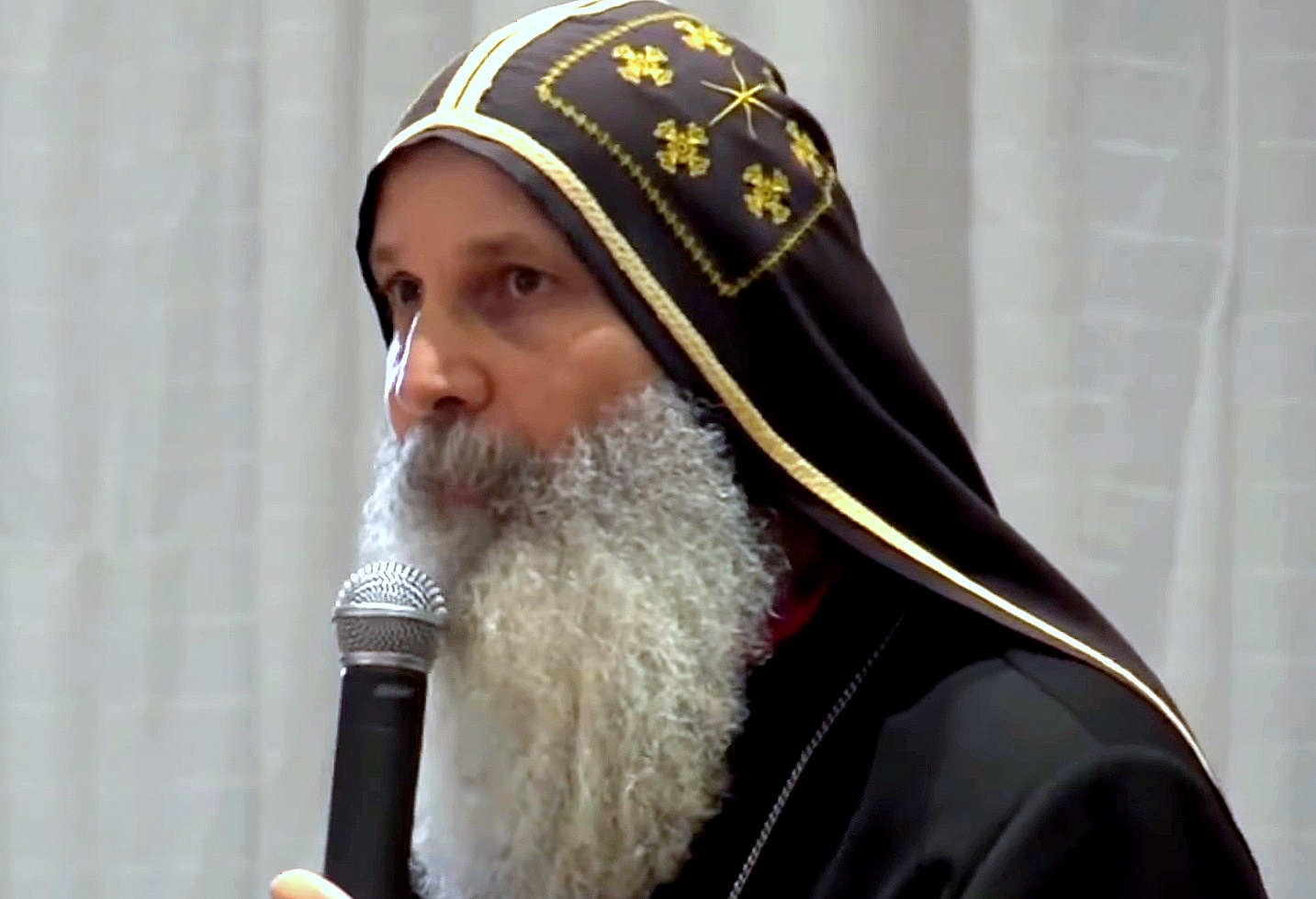
Emmanuel in 2014

In July 2013, while on a visit to Australia, Mar Addai II bestowed the patriarchal confirmation upon Emmanuel. However, at the time he ordered Emmanuel to make changes in regard to a range of different aspects of his priestly operation, including liturgical and theological aspects, as well as his social conduct. When the patriarch's deadline expired, Addai II suspended Emmanuel's priesthood in July 2014, on the grounds of disobeying canons promulgated by the First Council of Nicaea in AD 325. His suspension was briefly withdrawn in December 2014, when Emmanuel declared his acceptance of the patriarchal decrees, but renewed when he expressed his disagreement a second time. For a period of time, Emmanuel preached at St Zaia's Cathedral in Middleton Grange, New South Wales.

=== Controversies ===
In 2013, Emmanuel was accused of aggravated indecent assault after an 18-year-old woman alleged he had sexually touched her at his home following a late-night call for help. In June 2014, Magistrate Elaine Truscott found that Emmanuel, then serving as bishop at St Zaia's Cathedral in Sydney, had embraced and caressed the woman. She described his behavior as 'distinctly fallen from grace', but dismissed the charge on the basis that prosecutors had not proved beyond reasonable doubt that he was aware of her lack of consent. Emmanuel denied the allegations, saying he had never touched the woman sexually, and pleaded not guilty. The judgment rejected his account as 'untrue, in most respects', and prohibited him from contacting the woman for five years. That same year, he was suspended from the Ancient Church of the East and subsequently founded Christ The Good Shepherd Church.

=== Independent church ===
In January 2015, Emmanuel established himself as bishop of an independent church in the East Syriac tradition, in Wakeley, Christ The Good Shepherd Church. As of 2025, he is not listed as a clergyman in the Ancient Church of the East's Archdiocese of Australia, New Zealand, and Lebanon.

== Social media presence ==
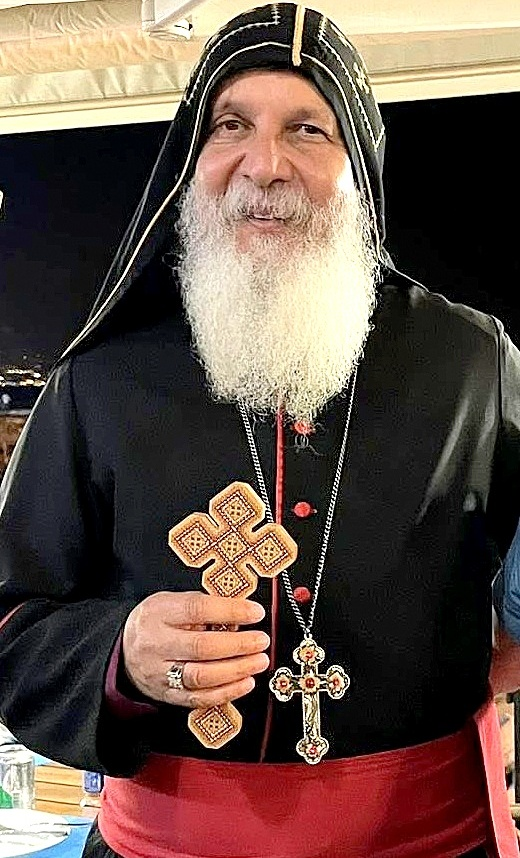
Emmanuel in 2025

From 2021, Emmanuel gained popularity through social media, such as Christ The Good Shepherd Church's YouTube channel and TikTok, which have a combined following of 258,000 users. He is usually dressed in a black pulpit gown, holding a large cross, and displaying his beard beneath a black cowl, following Assyrian tradition.

His sermons are delivered in both English and Assyrian at the Wakeley church and on Facebook and YouTube. In addition, he offers Sunday school classes for children and a youth group ministry. Clips from his live-streamed church sermons have been re-uploaded on social media and have amassed millions of views. His online presence combined with his views have made him a target for criticism, hate speech, and internet trolling. He has appeared on YouTube podcasts such as PBD Podcast and Valuetainment with Patrick Bet-David and Vincent Oshana, where the videos have received over one million views.

== Views ==
=== Religious views ===
Emmanuel's sermons on social media have included homilies on the Holy Bible and preaching on Christian values such as honesty, moderation and humility. He is a staunch critic of liberal Christianity. In a podcast titled Satan Has Engulfed the Churches, Emmanuel criticized Pope Francis, accusing him of "going woke". Some Christians have accused Emmanuel of adhering to Nestorianism, a doctrine condemned as heresy at the Council of Ephesus; Emmanuel denies the charge.

Emmanuel has frequently criticised the Quran and the teachings of the Prophet Muhammad. In one of his sermons, Emmanuel stated that "Islam flourished and expanded with the sword". During a podcast appearance in December 2023, he asserted that Jesus Christ was the only God and challenged Islamic teachings about Jesus, whom Muslims regard as a prophet. In another sermon, Emmanuel questioned the Quran's authority on the basis that it appeared centuries after the Bible, asking, "You want me to believe in a document that came seven centuries after the Holy Bible?"

=== Political views ===
Emmanuel has criticized U.S. President Joe Biden, including for Biden's support for gay rights. He has supported U.S. President Donald Trump and implored him to remain faithful to Christianity and defy the influence of Freemasons. Emmanuel described Donald Trump as America's "only hope". In a February 2024 sermon, he warned that the United States was "on the verge of collapse" and claimed that the country would be "gone" after Trump left politics. He expressed hope that Trump would embrace Jesus Christ as the "only true God", reverse laws that Emmanuel considered offensive, reintroduce the Bible into schools, and "stop LGBT nonsense". Amid the Gaza war, Emmanuel called for peace and expressed support for Palestinians in the Gaza Strip. In early 2024, he visited Gaza during the ongoing conflict.

Emmanuel has stated that homosexuality and same-sex marriage are incompatible with his interpretation of Christian scripture, describing it as a "crime in the eyes of God". He rejected the view that homosexuality is innate, instead describing it as a "condition" that may result from a combination of factors, which he suggested could include hormonal imbalances and family environment. He argued that marriage should be exclusively between a man and a woman and characterized same-sex relationships as "unnatural". Despite these views, Emmanuel stated that he did not intend to judge homosexual people, maintaining that "God is the only judge" and that he was expressing what he regarded as the Christian biblical position.

=== COVID-19 pandemic and international organisations ===
On 19 July 2021, amid the SARS-CoV-2 Delta variant outbreaks and the lockdown in Sydney, Emmanuel delivered an online sermon criticizing COVID-19 vaccinations and lockdowns, calling them "mass slavery". He described COVID-19 as "[…] just another type of the flu, no more, no less […]" and referred to the pandemic as a "plandemic". In one of his videos, he implored Australian prime minister Scott Morrison and NSW premier Gladys Berejiklian to do more to assist those experiencing financial and emotional hardship.

In another sermon, Emmanuel described the United Nations as a "harlot" and claimed that it was built on lies originating from Satan, contrasting it with what he described as the truth and honesty of Christ. He has also described the World Health Organization as a "fraud".

== 2024 murder attempt ==
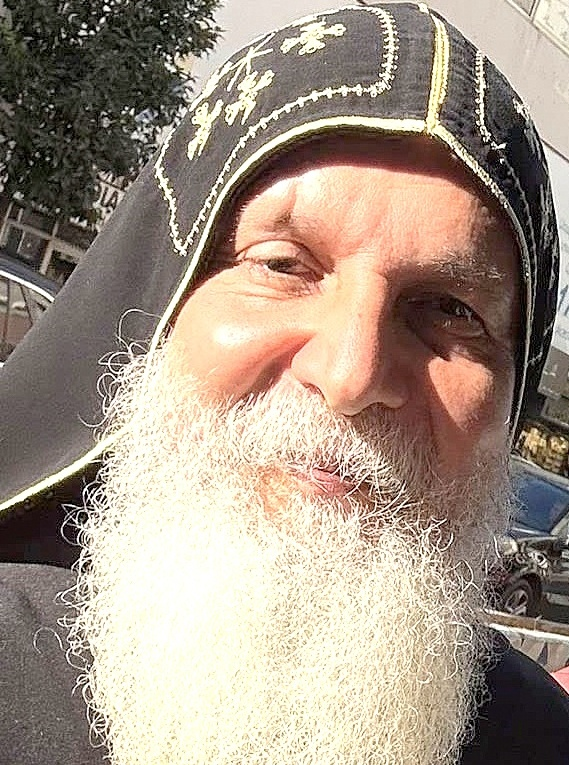
Emmanuel in 2025, with his visible eye injury and scarring

On 15 April 2024, shortly after 7:00 pm, Emmanuel was attacked by a 16-year-old Muslim during a sermon at Christ The Good Shepherd Church. At a pulpit, the assailant set upon Emmanuel from the latter's right and stabbed the bishop repeatedly with a switchblade until he fell after sustaining lacerations to his head; the perpetrator then stabbed five others. Just after the attack, Emmanuel prayed for the assailant.

According to the NSW police commissioner Karen Webb, Emmanuel underwent surgery and was 'lucky to be alive' In a video released by a churchgoer, the attacker was also heard saying 'if he [the bishop] didn't insult my prophet [Muhammad] and religion...I wouldn't have come here'. Police described the attack as 'religiously motivated Islamist' According to Emmanuel, about one month before the stabbing, threats were posted on TikTok, stating Emmanuel 'has two weeks to live'.

=== Emmanuel's response ===
In an online audio sermon at Liverpool Hospital on 18 April 2024, Emmanuel again forgave the attacker—and demanded his followers not seek revenge. He stated:

'Love never fails... whatever has happened to me personally I thank the Lord Jesus...I forgive whoever has done this act and I say to him, you are my son, I love you and I will always pray for you. And whoever sent you to do this, I forgive them as well, in Jesus' mighty name...I have nothing in my heart but love for everyone, whether this person is Christian or not, that is totally beside the point...I am doing fine, I am recovering very quickly.'

Ten days later on 29 April 2024, in his first sermon after the attack—which marked Eastern Orthodox Palm Sunday—Emmanuel stated that he lost his right eye and was wearing an eyepatch. He declared his eye injury as a 'sacrifice', and said it should be taken as an indication of love towards Muslims, before addressing the topic of freedom of speech.
