= Meelis Zaia =

Meelis Zaia AM (Member of the Order of Australia)
- Metropolitan of Australia, New Zealand and Lebanon
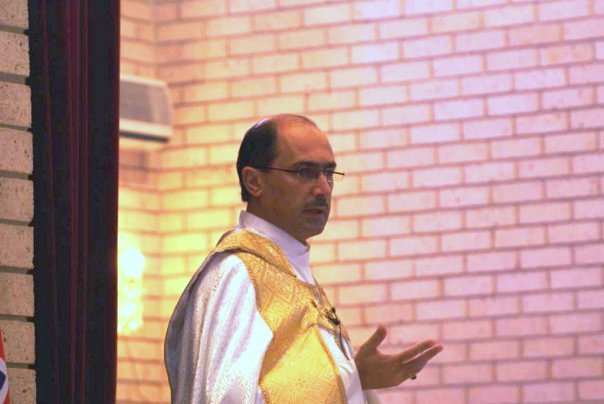
- Church: Assyrian Church of the East ܥܕܬܐ ܕܡܕܢܚܐ ܕܐܬܘܖ̈ܝܐ
- Metropolis: Australia, New Zealand and Lebanon
- Installed: March 1985
- Previous posts: Bishop of Australia and New Zealand (1984-2008)

Orders
- Ordination: 21 October 1984 (as Bishop), 7 December 2008 (as Metropolitan) by Mar Dinkha IV
- Rank: Metropolitan

Personal details
- Born: August 5, 1956 (age 70) Baghdad, Iraq
- Denomination: Assyrian Church of the East
- Residence: New South Wales, Australia
- Occupation: Cleric

H.B Mar Joseph Meelis Zaia AM (Syriac: ܡܝܠܣ ܙܝܥܐ (Note: Sometimes written ܡܝܠܣ ܙܝܐ.)), known as Mar Meelis Zaia, is the Metropolitan of the Assyrian Church of the East (Classical Syriac: ܥܕܬܐ ܕܡܕܢܚܐ ܕܐܬܘܖ̈ܝܐ), presiding over the Diocese of Australia, New Zealand and Lebanon. He also serves as the Chairman of the Board of Trustees which controls the financial affairs of the Church, and is one of five trustees of the Assyrian Church of the East Relief Organization, which he founded in 2017.

== Early life ==
A native of Baghdad, Meelis Zaia was ordained a priest of the Church in 1982 in California. He was appointed Bishop, being given the title of Mar, of the Church's diocese of Australia and New Zealand in 1984 and arrived to take up that position in March 1985, which he held until 2009 when he was elevated to Metropolitan of Australia, New Zealand and Lebanon. He is a fluent speaker of his native language Suret, and as well as Arabic and English.

== Archdiocese of Australia, New Zealand and Lebanon ==
Mar Meelis's archdiocese includes all of Australia, including Sydney and Melbourne, New Zealand and Lebanon. Presently, there are about 19,000 registered adult members who contribute financially to the Church, and about 4,500 registered non-paying members under the age of 18 years. Of the adult members there are approximately 13,000 in Sydney/New South Wales, 3,500 in Victoria, and 2,500 in New Zealand. The Assyrian community also includes about 6,000 people who are not members of the archdiocese. After the passing of Mar Narsai De Baz in February 2010, Mar Meelis was given additional responsibility of the Archdiocese of Lebanon, which was added to his title.

=== Parishes ===
- St Hurmizd Cathedral - Sydney, Australia
- Mart Mariam (St. Mary) Parish - Sydney, Australia
- Mar Gewargis (St. George) Parish - Little Bay, Australia
- St. Peter and Paul Parish - Sydney, Australia
- Mar Gewargis (St. George) Parish - Melbourne, Australia
- Mart Mariam (St. Mary) Parish - Auckland, New Zealand
- St. Odisho Parish - Wellington, New Zealand

=== Ministries ===
- Nisibis Assyrian Theological College - Sydney, Australia
- St. Narsai Assyrian Christian College - Sydney, Australia
- St. Hurmizd Assyrian Primary School - Sydney, Australia
- St. Hurmizd Early Learning Centre - Sydney, Australia
- Grace Child Care and Early Learning Centre - Sydney, Australia

== Accolades ==
On 26 January 2007, Mar Meelis was awarded a 'Member of the Order of Australia' (AM) Medal, in the Australia Day 2007 Honours List by the Queen of Australia, Elizabeth II, for his community service through the Assyrian Church of the East and for his pioneering work in the field of education and the establishment of educational facilities.

On 7 December 2008, Mar Meelis was elevated to the rank of Metropolitan of Australia, New Zealand and Lebanon, taking the honorific His Beatitude in place of the earlier His Grace. He was blessed by Mar Dinkha IV who flew from Chicago along with a further five bishops from around the world. The event drew close to 3,700 people at the St. Hurmizd Assyrian Cathedral, Greenfield Park in Sydney, Australia.

== Contributions ==
Since his arrival, as Bishop of the Diocese of Australia and New Zealand, Mar Meelis has expanded and contributed to the growth of the Church and its activities, which has steadily improved the Assyrian communities in both countries.

In 1988, Mar Meelis officially established the Assyrian Church Youth Group.

In 1990, he played a central role in obtaining a donation of $1.1 million to build a cathedral in Greenfield Park, and in 1999 assisted in the raising of funds for the construction of a reception hall on the cathedral property. In recent times, he played an important part in raising funds from others for the construction of classrooms and an administration facility for a primary school.

Mar Meelis was instrumental in the 2002 establishment, of the first Assyrian school outside of the Assyrian homeland (Mesopotamia), St. Hurmizd Assyrian Primary School in Sydney, accommodating to over 700 Kinder to Year 6 students.

In 2006, Mar Narsai (St. Narsai) Assyrian Christian College, a secondary school in Sydney, became the second school run by the Diocese of Australia and New Zealand, catering to approximately 1200 students in the Fairfield area and its surrounding suburbs.

In 2004, Mar Meelis approved and supported the establishment of the St. Peter and Paul Parish in Sydney; an English-speaking parish. The fledgling parish grew from 50 members to a 300+ strong congregation in less than two years. Meelis also initiated a number of programs for troubled youth including drug and alcohol addicts.

In 2007, he founded the Assyrian Church of the East Relief Organization (ACERO), which is a charitable aid/relief organization which supports Assyrian and other Christian refugees, and internally/externally displaced persons in the Middle East. It has its international headquarters in London, United Kingdom, and is registered with the relevant regulatory bodies in the countries in which it operates. He currently serves as one of the organization's five trustees.

His Beatitude has not only focused on educational institutions for the young and youth, but also the elderly. In 2012, St. Mary's Retirement Village (rear of St. Mary's Church) was opened, with 52 units of different configurations catering retirees.

In 2016, utilizing St Narsai's temporary campus (Nineveh Lounge), the Assyrian Language College was established where hundreds of youth and adults enrolled in classes run twice a week to learn the Assyrian language Aramaic.

In 2018, announcements were made for the establishment of another primary school in Sydney's Cecil Park, next door to Saints Peter and Paul Church.

In early 2019, Mar Meelis held a third meeting to discuss the establishment and academic teaching commencement of the Nisibis Assyrian Theological College in Sydney, during which a Dean was appointed.

== Controversies and lawsuits ==
In 1989, there was a major church split in the Church of the East in Fairfield. The event resulted in legal proceedings over property rights. After the Supreme Court of New South Wales ruled in favour of Bishop Mar Meelis, the Assyrian Church of the East Diocese of Australia and New Zealand, to take ownership of St Mary's Church, Assyrians of the Ancient Church of the East sect protested since they found the court's ruling highly objectionable and unjust, as their sect claimed the St Mary's Church beforehand. Richard Carleton from 60 minutes covered the story in a studio that contained around 200 Assyrians who opposed the Bishop. The Bishop described the actions of his raucous opponents as "primitive".

Mar Meelis's alleged efforts at controlling the Church Committee and taking possession of its assets (which had been registered under the Companies Act) split the Church of the East community into old and new calendar factions. He took the Old Calendar faction to court in order to take full control of St. Mary's church in 1988–9. This conflict also caused a split in the Australian branch of the AUA (based on the Church factions), and led to inter-communal rivalry between the Nineveh Club and the Assyrian Sports and Cultural Club, which aligned itself with the Old Calendar faction of the Church of the East and began its own Nisibin Assyrian School.

In 2017, churchgoer Sargon Eshow, who established a denunciation against Mar Meelis on Facebook, was ordered to pay $150,000 in damages after the religious leader sued him for calumny in the NSW Supreme Court. Eshow was suspended from the church for two years from April 2015, after making a couple of posts on his Facebook page in Arabic derisively criticizing the bishop. He was warned and told to cease from this behaviour. Eshow persevered, where he still went on and accused the archbishop of being evil, a hypocrite and "worse than ISIS". His posts also stated the archbishop was "violent, drunk, dishonest and incompetent and ... [had] made false accusations against the defendant". Justice Lucy McCallum said the defamation was "serious and persistent" and deserved a significant award of restitution.

== See also ==
- Assyrian Church of the East
