= Sam Bashiry =

Australian businessman and entrepreneur

- Education: Degree in Computer Science from Swinburne University
- Known for: Co-founding Broadband Solutions

Sam Bashiry is an Australian businessman and entrepreneur. Bashiry co-founded Broadband Solutions where he was CEO until 2017.

== Early life and career ==
Sam Bashiry was born in Tehran, Iran. At the age of 10 he came to Australia with his family and spent 2 years living in a detention centre.

Sam Bashiry later went on to study Computer Science at Swinburne University and worked in IT for a number of years prior to co-founding Broadband Solutions.

Sam Bashiry co-founded Broadband Solutions with Brad Hughes in 2005, with an initial investment of $1,000. Within ten years Broadband Solutions was a multi million dollar company, with 25 employees and turnover of $25 million in 2017.

Bashiry stepped down as CEO of Broadband Solutions in 2017 to focus on business expansion, motivational speaking and philanthropy. In 2018, he launched his own co-working space, Jungle Hub, in Melbourne.

== Award ==
In 2016, Bashiry won Ethnic Business Award in the medium to large business category.
