= Munif Mohammed Abou Rish =

Palestinian journalist and potential assassin

Munif Mohammed Abou Rish was a Palestinian journalist, who is claimed to have planned to assassinate Bob Hawke in the mid-1970s, at the time the federal president of the Australian Labor Party (and future prime minister of Australia).

According to reports by the Australian Security Intelligence Organisation (ASIO) released in 2007, Abou Rish entered Australia in 1974 on a fake passport provided to the Popular Front for the Liberation of Palestine (PFLP) by Palestinian Australians. Abou Rish remained in Australia for three weeks and intended to return in 1975 to carry out assassinations of Hawke; the Israeli ambassador to Australia, Michael Elizur; Jewish lay leader Isi Leibler; and Jewish journalist Sam Lipski.

In an interview, the former Palestinian ambassador for Australia and the South Pacific, Ali Kazak, denied the passports were fake and indicated that the PFLP never intended to assassinate Hawke. Abou Rish was "accidentally" killed in 1993 by Israeli security forces.
