= Faisal Faisal =

Iraqi athlete

Faisal Ghazi Faisal (Arabic: فَيْصَل غَازِي فَيْصَل; born 18 October 1980) is an Iraqi athlete who hoped to represent Iraq in the 2006 Winter Olympics.

== Early life and education ==
Faisal grew up in Baghdad and lived in Wales as a child.

He studied business management at the Central Queensland University in Sydney.

== Career ==
=== Summer sports ===
Faisal was an elite soccer player in Iraq, and a regional champion in the 200 meter sprint. His uncle, Talib Faisal, set the 400 meter hurdles Iraq record.

=== Winter sports ===
In 1998, he vowed to represent Iraq at the Winter Olympics. He applied unsuccessfully for a visa to the United Kingdom, Canada and Ireland, coming instead to Australia.

On weekends in Australia, where he was studying, he practiced skiing and then snowboarding. He tried speed skating, but was told he would not be able to represent Iraq because the country had no ice rinks. In September 2004, he considered ski jumping but a coach refused to help him.

In November 2004, he called the U.S. Bobsled and Skeleton Federation, hoping to participate in skeleton, and he was invited to Lake Placid to train.

Faisal missed out on qualifying for the 2006 Winter Olympics.
