= Assyrian Australians =

Ethnic group of Australia

Assyrians in Australia
ܣܘܪ̈ܝܐ ܕܐܘܣܛܪܠܝܐ
- (Assyrian homeland) (Australia)
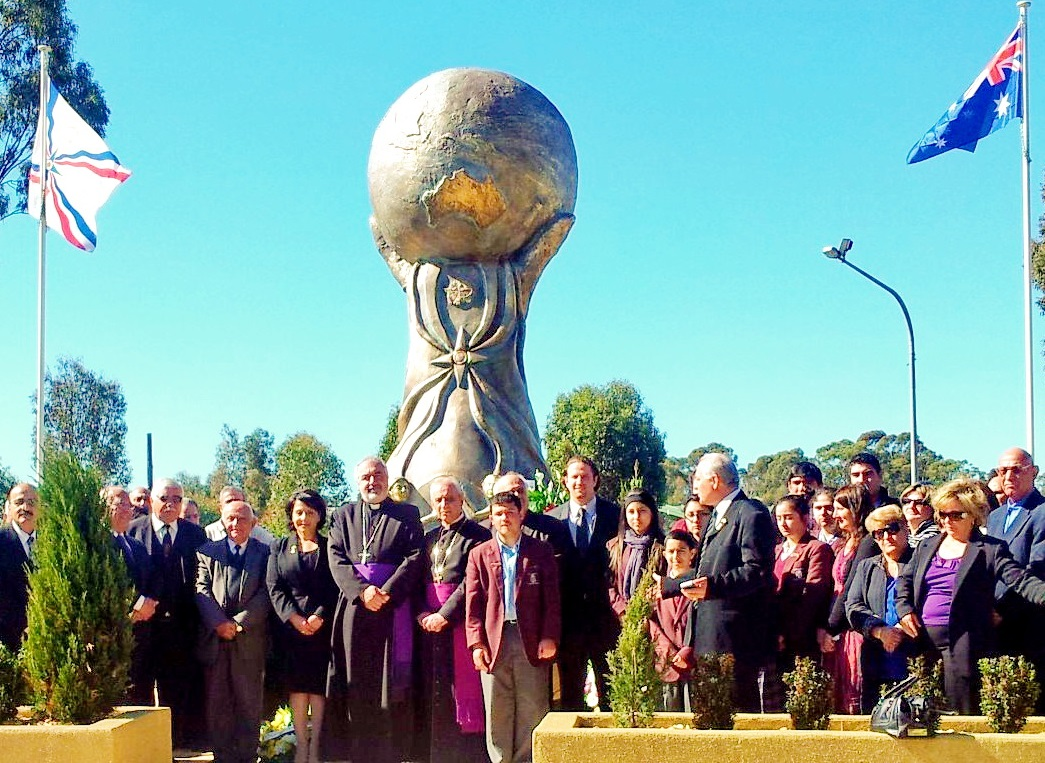
- Assyrians standing next to the genocide monument in Western Sydney.

Total population
- 61,000 ~ 70,000 (by ancestry, 2022)

Regions with significant populations
- Sydney, Melbourne, Brisbane

Languages
- Neo-Aramaic, English

Religion
- Christianity (majority: Syriac Christianity; minority: Catholicism and Protestantism)

Related ethnic groups
- Assyrian Americans, British Assyrians, Assyrian Canadians

Assyrian Australians (Syriac: ܣܘܪ̈ܝܐ ܕܐܘܼܣܛܪܵܠܝܼܵܐ, romanized: Sūryāyē d-Ūstrāliyā) are ethnic Assyrians or people of Assyrian descent possessing Australian nationality. According to the most recent census, 40,218 persons are Assyrian, while 21,166 identified themselves as having Chaldean ancestry. The majority of Assyrian Australians have immigrated from Iraq, Iran, Syria, Jordan and the Caucasus. The first Assyrians arrived in Australia in the 1950s, to flee from the 1958 revolution in Iraq.

Of the 61,400 Assyrians in Australia, 40,218 are members of the Assyrian Church of the East or Ancient Church of the East and 21,172 are members of the Chaldean Catholic Church. The City of Fairfield, in Sydney, has the most Assyrians in Australia, with 75% of Assyrians living in that area. 95% of Fairfield's Iraqi-born population are of Assyrian ancestry. Fairfield LGA has one of the most predominant Assyrian communities in the diaspora, where one in every ten person is Assyrian. In contrast to other migrants, Assyrians have the highest rate of acquiring the Australian citizenship.

In the 1980s, the Iraq-Iran war resulted in significant numbers of Assyrians fleeing Iraq and applying for refugee status. In the early 2000s, 5% of Australia's humanitarian immigrants identified as being adherents of Syriac churches. In May 2013, the Assyrian genocide was recognised by the New South Wales state parliament. Assyrian-Australians have established various clubs, social organisation, churches and language schools. In the 2021 census, 61,930 Australians reporting having Assyrian or Chaldean ancestry, representing 0.2% of the population.

== History ==
=== Early immigration (1950s–1970s) ===
The first Assyrian, named Brian Youkhana, arrived in Sydney in 1951, from Lebanon, where he was joined by his siblings four years later. In the late 1950s, another family settled in Perth. By 1965, there were around five Assyrian families and a few individuals living in the eastern Sydney suburbs of Randwick, Paddington and Clovelly. Although around 80% of the arrivals lived in the suburbs of Fairfield LGA in Greater Western Sydney, some Assyrians settled in the eastern suburbs, a region on Sydney's coast. During that period 4,500 Assyrians came from Iraq, 2,500 from Iran and 1,000 from Syria and Lebanon. According to Dinkha Warda, Fairfield was the most popular settlement among Assyrians for reason as follows:

Back in 1966, a small meeting was held between the early settlers to decide the future of Assyrians in this country...In 1966, Fairfield's developed area went west up to the Cumberland Highway. The majority of those attending the meeting agreed to establish the Assyrian community in Fairfield. The reason was to centralise the development of all the Assyrian social, religious and sporting activities, allowing greater access and participation. If we remained in the Sydney city area, we would have scattered. And so, four or five families purchased fibro houses in Fairfield (including myself), and a few bought blocks of land.

In 1969, after the settlement of Assyrians in the Fairfield area, the Assyrian Australian Association (AAA) was established. The significance of the AAA is based primarily on the fact that it was the first registered Assyrian organisation in Australia. Prior to AAA, there had existed an unofficial club called the Assyrian Australian Club which was established in 1966 and initially based for the Assyrians residing in the Eastern suburbs of Sydney prior to the move to the Fairfield area. The Assyrian Australian Club was replaced with the Assyrian Sports and Cultural Club in 1972, the second official Assyrian secular organisation to be registered in NSW after the AAA. After a brief period of inactivity, the Assyrian Sports and Cultural Club was relocated to the Fairfield area after many Assyrians moved during the housing boom in the late 1970s and the early 1980s, where it has remained active since. In the 1970s, a few soccer clubs were established as the Assyrian community began to have a prominence. An Assyrian language school was formed in 1974, thanks to the AAA.

=== Community growth (1980s–2000s) ===
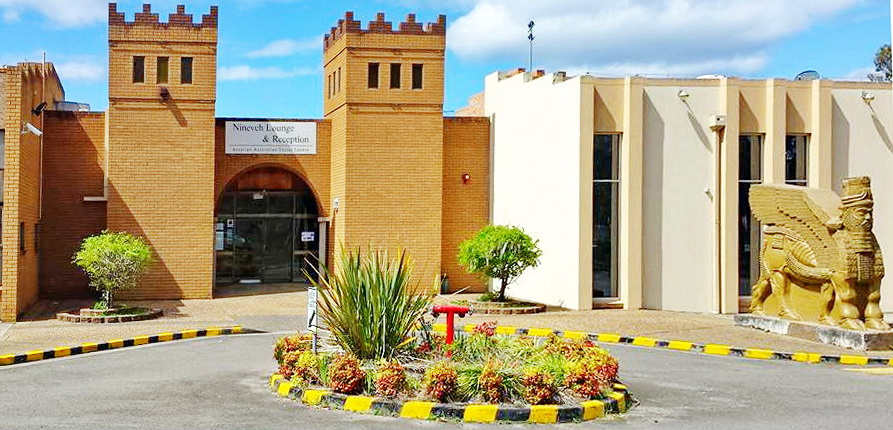
The Nineveh Club in Smithfield Rd, Edensor Park, is the largest Assyrian club in Australia.

In 1980, the Nineveh Club, a prominent Assyrian club in Edensor Park, Sydney, was established. Built with artificial mud brick, the club was designed after Assyrian royal palace in Nineveh. The entryway features two winged bull statues containing the body of a lion, the head of an Assyrian king and wings of an eagle. In the late 1980s, the Church of the East was controversially split – The Church of the East in Australia from that time on now has two denominations; The 'old' (Ancient Church of the East) and the 'new' (Assyrian Church of the East).

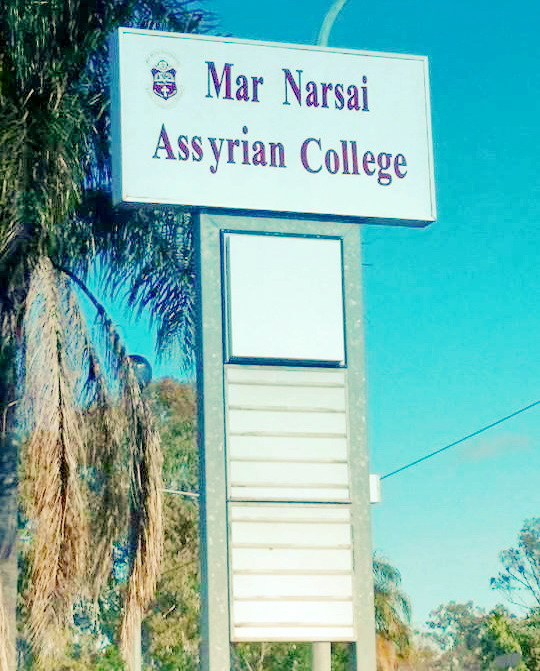
The billboard of St Narsai Assyrian College.

As the Assyrian community grew in the late 1980s, the Assyrian Sports and Cultural Club leased its premises from 1990 onwards, in Fairfield Heights, Sydney and acquired liquor and gaming licenses. The club later purchased its current building in 1997, and it was officially opened in 2000. Currently, it is the only Assyrian club in operation after the closure of the Nineveh Club in 2008. The club co-hosted sports events such as The Assyrian Cup soccer tournaments and held functions and activities for the community. It has supported migrants, who arrived in the 1990s, settle in the country and it encouraged education by aiding achievers in the high school certificate. During the late 1990s, there was an increased level of Assyrian migration to Australia under the family reunion, refugee and humanitarian programs. Reportedly, around 903 Assyrian arrivals were allowed under the Australian Government's Special Humanitarian Program and the Family Reunion Program.

In 1997, it was reported that, for the Assyrian youth, lack of English skills was the major impediment for gaining employment, school achievement and becoming socially manoeuvrable in the Australian society. For instance, some Fairfield High School Assyrians wanted to go to university but felt hopeless because of their poor English. As such, several Assyrian churches developed a number of youth programs. For Assyrians with a higher education, the problem was also language and unacceptability of overseas qualifications, which prevented them from pursuing their careers.

The opening of St Hurmizd Assyrian Primary School in 2002, in Sydney, was the first school from the ACOE that was established in the international diaspora. In 2006, also in Sydney, St. Narsai Assyrian Christian College was established. It was the first ACOE high school to be built in the western world.

=== Post-Iraqi war (2010s–present) ===
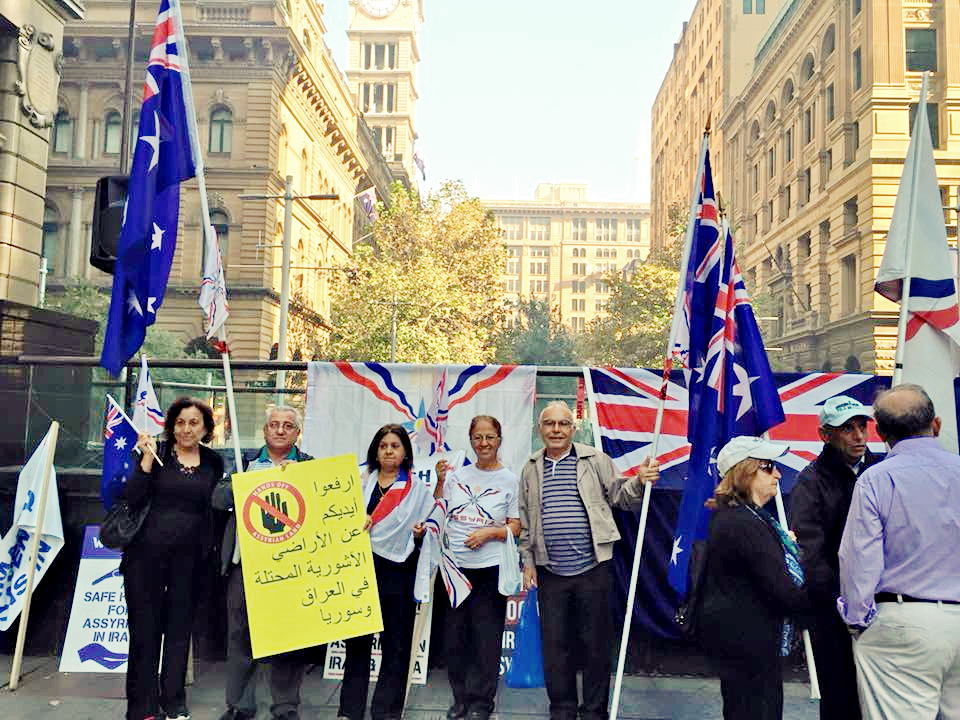
Assyrian Australians protesting against the Genocide of Christians by ISIL in Sydney, 2014.

In August 2010, a memorial monument for the Assyrian genocide was erected in Bonnyrigg. The statue, 4.5 meters tall, is of a hand of a martyr draped in an Assyrian flag. The memorial is placed in a reserve, to be named the Garden of Nineveh. The statue and the name for the reserve were proposed in August 2009. After consultation with the community, Fairfield Council received more than 100 submissions, including some from overseas, and two petitions. The proposal was condemned by the Turkish community. Turkey's consul general to Sydney expressed resentment about the monument, while acknowledging that tragedies had occurred to Assyrians in the period, as well as to Turks.

In August 2014, more than 6,000 Assyrians marched in Belmore Park in Sydney CBD to protest against the treatment of their Assyrian counterparts in Iraq and Syria by ISIL. Many wore T-shirts reading the hashtag #WeAreN, and chanted "we want peace, we want justice" and "save our Christians". They also waved posters, which read "stop genocide against our Christians" and "stop crimes against humanity". They marched in Elizabeth Street, through the city to Martin Place. Assyrian Community leaders made passionate speeches requesting that the Australian and other international governments help those being persecuted in the Middle East.

In 2015, the Abbott government announced that 12,000 extra humanitarian visas would be given to persecuted groups in the war-torn Middle Eastern countries. The Department of Social Services confirmed that 11,400 Iraqi and Syrian refugees, many of whom being Assyrian, were admitted to Australia as part of its one-off humanitarian intake, where they would primarily settle in Fairfield and Liverpool. The Assyrians told SBS World News they were in a state of despair, as they hoped more of their kin from the Middle East were brought to Australia. Carmen Lazar, manager of the Assyrian Resource Centre, said, "If they can just lend another hand, you know, give us another 12,000 intake, just to release that pressure from what's happening overseas".

On 15 April 2024, Assyrians were a target in a terrorist attack at a Wakeley church, where an Islamic extremist stabbed bishop Mar Mari Emmanuel and five others. All survived.

== Demographics ==
=== Distribution ===
==== Sydney ====
The percent of Sydney residents who speak Assyrian Neo-Aramaic, in the 2011 census.

The percent of Australians who identify as being part of the Assyrian Church of the East in the 2011 census.

The percent of people in NSW and Victoria who speak Assyrian in the 2011 census.

In Sydney, Assyrians are the leading ethnic group in the Fairfield LGA suburbs of Fairfield, Fairfield Heights and Greenfield Park. Ample amount of Assyrians exist in other suburbs in the Fairfield LGA, such as, Bossley Park, Prairiewood, Wakeley, Wetherill Park, Abbotsbury, Smithfield, Fairfield West, Bonnyrigg Heights, Horsley Park and Cecil Park. One in every ten people living in Fairfield City is of Assyrian heritage. Fairfield Public School and Fairfield High School have high a proportion of Assyrian students, and as well as Bossley Park High School.

In City of Liverpool, a LGA that borders Fairfield City, they're found in Cecil Hills, Green Valley, Hoxton Park, Hinchinbrook and Middleton Grange. In the southern and eastern suburbs, they're mainly found in Hillsdale, Matraville, as well as Maroubra.

Sydney's local government areas with the most Assyrians, population and percentage-wise:

Greater Fairfield is home to over 20,000 Assyrians.

- Fairfield City: 13,437 (5.7%)
- Liverpool City: 2,451 (1.3%)
- Bayside Council: 635 (1.22%)
- Blacktown City: 459 (0.15%)
- Canterbury-Bankstown: 202 (0.11%)

==== Melbourne ====
In Melbourne, Assyrians tend to be found in the northwest region, in the suburbs of Broadmeadows, Craigieburn, Meadow Heights, Roxburgh Park and Fawkner. According to the 2016 census, Melbourne had around 13,000 citizens who claimed Assyrian ancestry.

The population of Assyrians in the suburbs of Melbourne (2016 census):

- Roxburgh Park – 3,281
- Craigieburn – 2,573
- Meadow Heights – 1,334
- Greenvale – 571
- Coolaroo – 337
- Gladstone Park, Victoria – 199

==== Brisbane ====
In Brisbane, small Assyrian communities are slowly growing around the Moreton Bay area such as Bracken Ridge and Strathpine including in Logan City such as Woodridge and Loganlea due to the recent Syrian and Iraqi refugees coming into Australia.

According to the 2016 census, they are 311 Assyrians living in Brisbane which has almost doubled from the 2011 census. 407 Iraqis according to the 2016 census in Brisbane identified as Christian.

=== General statistics ===
In the 1996 census, there were 9571 people who spoke Assyrian in the state of NSW, and 2191 in Victoria. 60% of these Assyrians were born in Iraq, 21% in Australia and 13% in Iran. Also in that time, 54% belong to the Assyrian Church of the East, 27% belonged to the Chaldean Catholic Church and 7% to the Orthodox church. In the 2001 census, 9,520 Fairfield LGA residents stated they were of Assyrian ancestry and 8,879 residents stated they spoke Assyrian at home. The Assyrian-speakers living in NSW were 13,241 at that time. In the 2011 Census, Sydney had 21,678 people of Assyrian descent, and Melbourne had 8,057. Assyrians are the third largest language-group residing in the Fairfield area behind the Arabic and Vietnamese-speakers, respectively.

According to the 2001 census, 29% of Assyrian migrants in Fairfield were usually made up of large families with five members or more. 13- to 24-year-olds made up 18% of the migrating population and 25–54 years were at 57%. 25% of them did not speak English well. 43% of the Assyrians in the Fairfield LGA owned their home, and they generally worked in manufacturing (39%), trade, accommodation, hospitality and transport industries (31%).

Whilst the new arrivals are settling in Fairfield CBD and Fairfield Heights, the pre-mid-1990s arrivals have purchased and/or rented houses in the more affluent suburbs of Fairfield City, such as, Bossley Park, Wetherill Park and Greenfield Park, which are around 6 kilometres (3.7 miles) west from Fairfield CBD. Furthermore, some of the recently arrived Assyrian children have had psychological trauma for the experiences in their countries of origin, which encroached their settlement in Australia.

== Culture ==
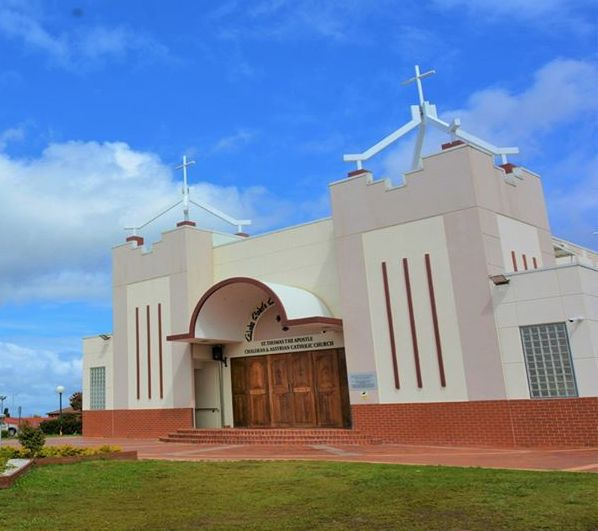
Saint Thomas Cathedral, built in 2006.

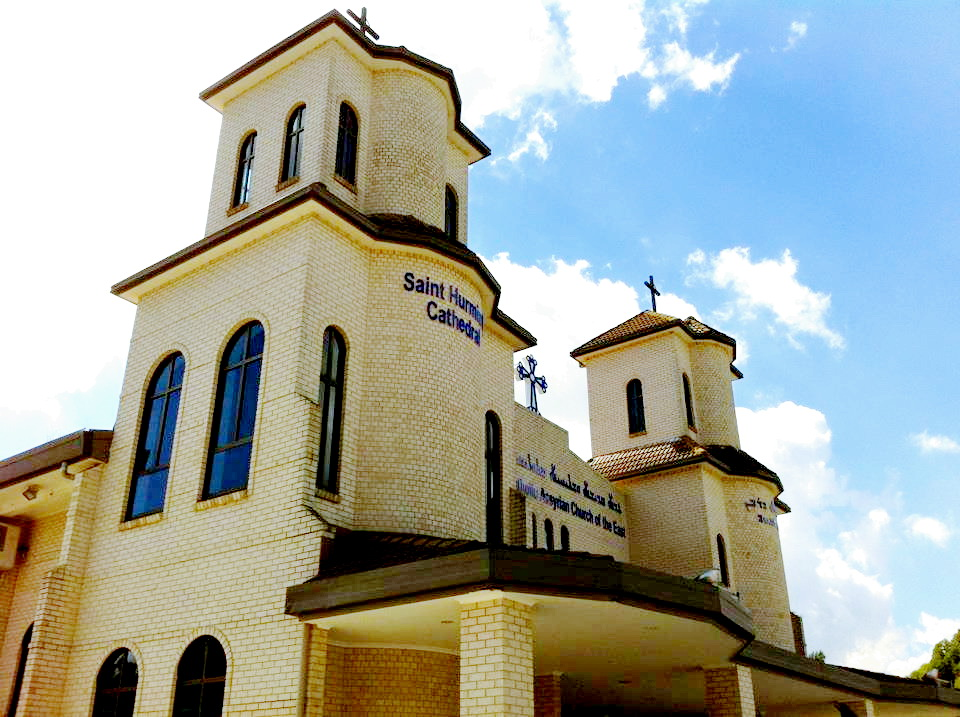
Established in 1990, St Hurmiz Cathedral in Sydney is the largest ACOE church in Australia.

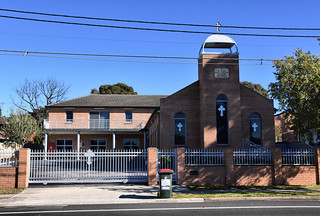
St Malkeh Syriac Orthodox Church in Greenacre, Sydney

Sydney has seven prominent Assyrian church buildings; St Mary's Church in Smithfield (established in 1975), St Thomas Church in Bossley Park, St Mary's Assumption Church in Fairfield, St Hurmiz Cathedral in Greenfield Park, St Malkeh Church in Greenacre, and St Zaia Cathedral in Middleton Grange.

In Melbourne, the churches are Our Lady Guardian of Plants Chaldean Catholic Church in Campbellfield, Victoria, St. George's Church of the East in Reservoir, Victoria, Holy Spirit Syriac Catholic Church in Dallas and St Aphrem Syrian Orthodox Church, which also is in Reservoir, Victoria.

Assyrians, depending on the village/town they belong to commemorate their specific patron saints and celebrate it usually with their families at picnics or halls. For example, the Assyrians from Batnaya commemorate Mar Oraha. The feast of Mar Oraha is partaken in an annual prayer and celebration. Celebrations include traditional Assyrian dancing with singers, food and people wearing traditional Assyrian clothing from Batnaya.

Assyrians from the town of Alqosh commemorate Saint Hurmizd, a monk that established his monastery in Alqosh. Alqoshnaye celebrate the Feast of Saint Hurmizd, known as 'Shara'd Rabban Hurmizd' around the world. This event is celebrated through picnics or halls, like many other Shereh (Feasts). People from Alqosh, like many other Assyrian towns/villages wear their traditional clothing at these events which commemorate their patron saints and celebrate the history of their towns.

Some ACOE adherents in Sydney annually commemorate Saint Zaia (Shara 'D Mar Zaia) at Blaxland Crossing Reserve in the suburb of Wallacia on September. Hundreds attend the occasion, including Assyrian singers who perform for the event. Visitors would generally picnic, barbecue or relax in the Australian bush, and they would usually participate in Assyrian folk dance. This is the second largest Assyrian social gathering in Sydney after the New Year celebration in Fairfield Showground.

Fairfield's large Assyrian community has had the media describe the suburb as 'Little Iraq' or 'Little Assyria'. Assyrian businesses have opened in Fairfield, mostly in Ware Street and Smart Street, and in Fairfield Heights in The Boulevarde. These businesses include everything from jewellery shops to restaurants and convenient stores, making the area favourite entertainment and shopping hot spot for the Assyrian community.

=== Entertainment ===
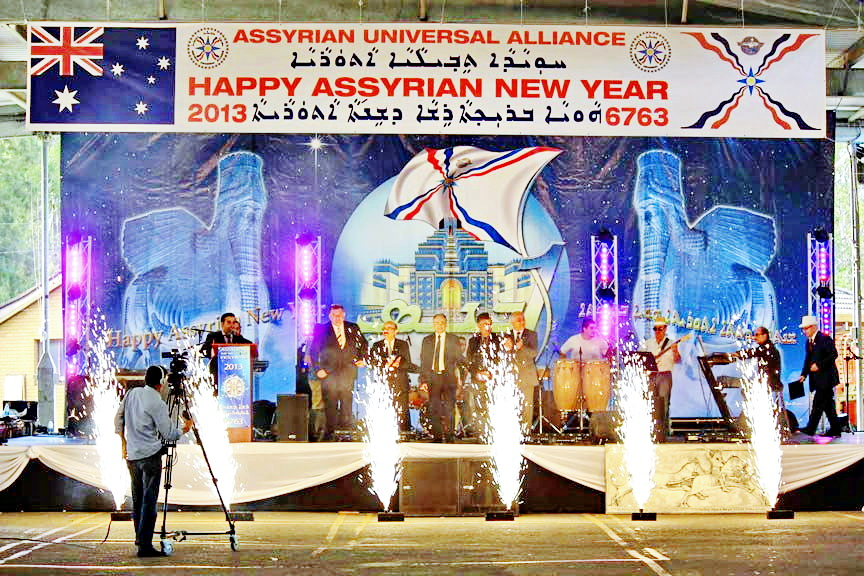
The annually held Assyrian New Year festival in Sydney, Australia.

Both Nineveh Club and Assyrian Sports and Cultural Club support and showcase local Assyrian talents, such as singers, actors, musicians, painters and sculptors. The clubs contain reception halls and they usually host singer concerts (including lounge singers), festive parties, weddings, theatrical plays and other forms of social entertainment for the Assyrians in Sydney. Wardeh Deesheh, the first film in the Assyrian language to be shot in Australia, was released in 1991.

The Assyrians in Sydney lavishly celebrate the Assyrian New Year annually on 1 April, in Fairfield Showground in Prairiewood. Thousands attend the New Year festival and it usually features music and theatrical performances, traditional dancers, food stalls and fireworks. Former Australian prime minister Tony Abbott and other politicians such as Chris Bowen, Craig Kelly, Tanya Plibersek, Chris Hayes and former NSW premier Bob Carr have attended the festival and made a speech.

=== Church split controversy ===
In 1989, there was a major church split in the Church of the East in Fairfield, which shook and divided the community. The notorious event resulted in legal proceedings over property rights and it even received national media coverage. After the Supreme Court of New South Wales ruled in favour of bishop Mar Meelis Zaia, the Assyrian Church of the East diocese of Australia and New Zealand, to take ownership of St Mary's Church, Assyrians of the Ancient Church of the East sect protested since they found the court's ruling highly objectionable and unjust, as their sect claimed the St Mary's Church beforehand. A few of them eventually got involved in a frantic brawl outside the courthouse with those part of the Assyrian Church of the East sect.

Richard Carleton from 60 minutes covered the story in a studio that contained around 200 Assyrians who opposed the bishop. Carleton belligerently faced the few men who were involved in the brawl and asked if they were apologetic about their actions, which the men stated they were merely acting in "self-defense" and "fighting for their rights" (as the court neglected their perspective). The Bishop described the actions of his raucous opponents as "primitive". Author and journalist David Leser criticised the 60 Minutes portrayal of Assyrians in his book The Whites of Their Eyes, saying, "12 minutes of prime-time baiting of a community that had been law-abiding and peaceful prior to and subsequent to that event. There was no one millisecond devoted to explaining the intricacies of the dispute".

=== Sport ===
Assyrian Australians, like many other Assyrians from around the world, are mainly fond of soccer, and have established various football clubs in Australia. Fairfield Bulls Soccer Club, based in Sydney, is the most prominent soccer club in the country. It was established in 1971 and it has involved hundreds of children and teenagers in different age teams. Legislated by Football NSW, Fairfield Bulls became a standalone club in 2005. The Soccer Club was linked with Nineveh Sports and Community Club. Another conspicuous Assyrian soccer club in Sydney, established in the early 1970s, is the Fairfield Eagles, a club affiliated with the Assyrian Sports and Cultural Club.

In Melbourne, two Assyrian soccer teams exist; Moreland United FC and Upfield FC. Many Assyrian people cheer for their teams, local and international. The teams include the Assyriska FF, as well as the Iraqi, Syrian and Iranian national teams. Sydney's Assyrian community assembled in Fairfield to celebrate Iraq qualifying for the Asian Football Cup finals in 2007. More than 7000 people, including Iraqi Arabs, joined in street celebrations around Fairfield on Sunday 29 July 2007 after Iraq won the Asian Cup finals.

== Media ==
Most Assyrian-Australian media is aired on the radio. Assyrian radio has a variety of themes and topics which consist mainly of Assyrian music and interviews with prominent Assyrian individuals, and politics, current events, weather, sport and history. These subjects are usually affiliated with Assyrian people, their culture and homeland. In the late 90s through to 2004, channel 31, a community channel, broadcast in Assyrian one to three hours a week.

=== Radio ===
- SBS Radio, which airs in Sydney and Melbourne, broadcasts in the Assyrian language every Saturday and Tuesday evenings from 8 pm to 9 pm.
- 2000FM, a Sydney radio station, airs in the Assyrian language every Monday mornings for three hours, on the frequency of 98.5 FM.
- 2GLF, a community radio station in Sydney's suburb of Liverpool, on the frequency of 89.3 FM, broadcasts a number of Assyrian shows. Nohadra Radio, established in 1998, is the most prominent Assyrian radio show on the station, which airs Sunday nights from 8 pm to 10 pm.

== Assyrian Australians ==
- Emil Shimoun Nona – Current bishop of the Chaldean Catholic Church in Australia & New Zealand.
- Sham Khamis – Plays for Canberra United FC in the Australian W-League.
- Ninos Khoshaba – Politician and is a former member of Parliament of New South Wales.
- Cindy Sargon – TV chef and business woman.
- Meelis Zaia – Assyrian Church of the East's metropolitan bishop of Australia, New Zealand and Lebanon.
- Andrew Rohan – A politician, who was a member of the New South Wales Legislative Assembly representing Smithfield for the Liberal Party of Australia from 2011 to 2015.
- Leena Khamis – Plays for Sydney FC in the Australian W-League and the Matildas.
- Mario Shabow – Plays for Central Coast Mariners FC in the A-League.
- Sue Ismiel – Founder and owner of Nad's.
- Michael Denkha – Actor known for films such as The Combination and popular Australian TV show Here Come the Habibs
- Anwar Khoshaba – Former Mayor of Fairfield.
- Robin Zirwanda – Singer most known from his Assyrian Latin dance band Azadoota
- Ashur Shimon – Australian comedian, TV personality and lead role on Fat Pizza
- Joseph Haweil – Mayor of Hume City Melbourne
- Mar Mari Emmanuel – bishop, writer and influencer
- Danella Butrus — Australian soccer player, plays for Melbourne City in the A-League Women

== See also ==
- Iraqi Australians
- Mandaean Australians
- Lebanese Australians
- Syrian Australians
- Greek Australians
- Jewish Australians
- Armenian Australians
- Iranian Australians
- Israeli Australians
- Australian Jews
