= Iranian Australians =

Iranian Australians ایرانیان استرالیا
Total population
- 70,899 (by birth, 2021); 81,119 (by ancestry, 2021)

Regions with significant populations
- New South Wales, Victoria, Queensland

Languages
- Persian, Australian English (Azeri, Armenian, Kurdish, Mandaic and other languages of Iran).

Religion
- 37.3% No religion 30.1% Muslim; 10.3% Bahai; 2.7% Christianity

Iranian Australians or Persian Australians are Australians who are of Iranian ancestry or who hold Iranian citizenship. In 2021 they numbered 81,119, according to the 2021 Census

== Terminology ==
Iranian-Australian is used interchangeably with Persian-Australian, partly due to the fact that, in the Western world, Iran was known as "Persia". On the Nowruz of 1935, Reza Shah Pahlavi asked foreign delegates to use the term Iran, the endonym of the country used since the Sasanian Empire, in formal correspondence. Since then the use of the word "Iran" has become more common in the Western countries. This also changed the usage of the terms for Iranian nationality, and the common adjective for citizens of Iran changed from "Persian" to "Iranian". In 1959, the government of Mohammad Reza Shah Pahlavi, Reza Shah Pahlavi's son, announced that both "Persia" and "Iran" could officially be used interchangeably. However the issue is still debated today.

== History ==
The first known Iranian immigrant to Australia and New Zealand was Hamed Mortis (Persian: حامد مورتیس) born in 1867, who as an 11 year old was based in Barrabool, VIC in 1878 and then got naturalised in NSW on 20 October 1883. Unfortunately, in 1886, as a confectioner living in New Zealand he was sentenced to 14 days labour at Auckland Prison, details about his sentence can be seen in the table below.

Fullname	Date of Birth	Gaol and Place Tried	Date tried	Offence	Sentence	Trade	Physical Description
Mortis Hamed alias Ahmad	1867	Auckland	February 1, 1886	Indecent language	14 days labour	Confectioner	5 ft height, dark complexion, black hair, dark brown eyes, large nose, medium mouth, medium chin, small pox marks on both arms

The only other early Iranian immigrant to NSW was Mohamad Ameen Khan (Persian: محمد امین خان), who was residing in Gunnedah on 8 October 1898 and became naturalised on 29 June 1899.

Few Iranians migrated to Victoria in the nineteenth century, with only seven recorded in the 1891 census. From 1950 to 1977, the first wave of immigration from Iran to Australia occurred, but it was relatively insignificant in terms of the number of immigrants. Annually, few thousand tourists entered Australia which only a few hundreds were immigrants during this period, mostly university students who decided to stay. The vast majority of Iran's emigrants left their homeland just after the 1979 Islamic revolution which was the end of 2500 years of monarchy. For the period 1978–1980, the average number of Iranians entering Australia as immigrants annually increased to more than 5,000. From the period 1980–1988, there was a strong trend of emigration to Australia. Since 2000, there has been a wave of Iranian migration to Australia, especially engineers and doctors, through skilled migration program.

Iranians speak Persian and also Azerbaijani Turkish, Kurdish, and some other Persian languages and dialects are spoken in different regions of Iran. They practice the Iranian culture, which includes Nowruz. Along religious lines, both Muslim and non-Muslim Iranians reside in Australia. Non-Muslim Iranians include Iranian Christians (mainly Armenian and Assyrian), Iranian Baháʼís, Iranian Mandaeans, Iranian Jews and Iranian Zoroastrians. The Bureau of Statistics reports that at the 2011 census the major religious affiliations amongst Iran-born were Islam (12 686) and Baháʼí (6269). Of the Iran-born, 18.4 per cent stated 'No Religion', which was lower than that of the total Australian population (22.3 per cent), and 9.4 per cent did not state a religion.

== Iranian Australian census ==
In 1991, Australian Bureau of Statistics (ABS) figures revealed an Iranian population of 12,914. In 2004, 18,798 people in Australia claim to be of Iranian ancestry.

== Notable people ==
- Soheil Abedian, founder and CEO of Sunland Group
- Arman Abrahimzadeh, domestic violence campaigner
- Shervin Adeli, futsal player
- Hoda Afshar, artist
- Mojean Aria, actor
- Daniel Arzani, footballer
- Sam Bashiry, entrepreneur
- Salah Choheili, Mandaean priest
- Donya Dadrasan, singer
- Sam Dastyari, senator for NSW
- Michael Denkha, actor
- Nabil Elderkin (mother is Iranian), film and music video director
- Kamran Eshraghian, engineer
- Alireza Faghani, football referee
- Amir Farid, pianist
- Salme Geransar, actress
- Zarah Ghahramani, writer
- Anise K, songwriter
- Shokufeh Kavani, painter
- Beejan Land, actor
- Joey Mead King, model, VJ, and TV and events host (Iranian father)
- Ashkan Mokhtarian, MMA fighter
- Granaz Moussavi, poet, film maker
- Anoushiravan Nourian, boxer
- Rita Panahi, opinion columnist
- Phoenix Raei, actor
- Ali Pahlavan, pop singer
- Tina Rahimi, boxer
- Nabi Saleh, founder of Gloria Jean's Coffees
- Hassan Shahsavan, Greco-Roman wrestler
- Farzad Tarash, freestyle wrestler
- Hossein Valamanesh, artist

== See also ==
- Australia–Iran relations
- Iranian peoples
- Persian people
- 2,500 year celebration of the Persian Empire
- Shirazi wine
- Iranian diaspora
- Iraqi Australians
- Kurdish Australians
- Baloch Australians
- Turkish Australians
- Armenian Australians
- Assyrian Australians
- Iranian New Zealanders
- Mandaean Australians
