= Eritrean Australians =

Ethnicity of Australians who are of full or partial Eritrean heritage

Total population
- 6,863 (by ancestry, 2016); 4,289 (by birth, 2016).

Regions with significant populations
- Melbourne

Languages
- Various (languages of Eritrea), Australian English

Religion
- Eritrean Orthodox Tewahedo Church, Islam

Related ethnic groups
- Ethiopian Australians, Sudanese Australians, Somali Australians

Eritrean Australians are a hyphenated ethnicity of Australians who are of full or partial Eritrean national origin, heritage and/or ancestry. They are immigrants from Eritrea to Australia and their descendants. Eritrea is a multi-ethnic country with the most common ethnic group being the Tigrinya. However, Tigrinya speakers are more commonly found in Ethiopia than Eritrea. Because of this, many Eritreans can be found in Ethiopian communities.

== Migration history ==
Eritrea gained independence in 1991 and many Eritreans left after independence was gained due to the Eritrean–Ethiopian War and to escape the government of Isaias Afwerki. Between 1983 and 1993, a few hundred Eritreans arrived in Australia as refugees due to the Eritrean War of Independence. They were given special condition under the Australia's Humanitarian Program which allowed an average of 100 Eritreans to migrate for the first three years of the program. But before 1983 only a few Eritreans arrived in Australia as refugees. Many arrivals before 1993 were young men whose educations had been interrupted by the war of independence. Many of the refugees settled in Victoria within the suburbs of Springvale and Maribyrnong and mostly worked in factories.

The peak of Eritrean refugee resettlement to Australia came after 1993, as many Eritreans left the country after independence due to the Eritrean–Ethiopian War and to escape the government of Isaias Afwerki. Many Eritreans have suffered tragedy while immigrating to other countries, including Australia.

== Numbers and distribution ==
According to the 2016 Australian census 4,289 Australians were born in Eritrea while another 6,863 claimed ancestry, however the Eritrean community is a relatively new community to Australia and these numbers grow every year.

About 50% of Eritreans live in Melbourne, alongside communities of immigrants from other countries in the Horn of Africa, mainly Ethiopia and Somalia; they are primarily settled in the City of Brimbank and neighbouring suburbs such as Wyndham, Carlton, Hume, Moonee Valley, and Maribyrnong. Other communities of Eritreans can be found in Queensland and Western Australia.

== Education and employment ==
According to the 2016 Census, 91.3% of Eritrean-born Australians are 15 years and over in age, and only 3% have a Postgraduate Degree, 1% have a Grad Dip & Grad Cert, 11.8% have a bachelor's degree, 12.2% have an Advanced Dip & Diploma, 11.9% have a Certificate, 43.3% have a School Education only, 6.4% have no education and 10% didn't state/other.

Eritrean-born individuals in Australia aged 15 years are heavily employed in the labour force at a rate of 56.2%; the unemployment rate for Eritreans was 11.4%. Of the 88.6% of Eritrean-born immigrants who were employed, 11.9% worked in a Manufacturing, 1.35% in Construction, 5.8% in Wholesale & retail trade, 1.9% in Accommodation & Food services, 14.8% in Transport, postal & warehousing, 10% in Prof, Scientific, Technical & Admin, 3.8% in Public Administration and Safety, 7.9% in Education & Training, 25.2% in Health Care & Social Assistance, 5.1% in Arts, Recreation & Other services, 12.25% in Inadequately Described/Not Stated/Other. In Melbourne, some have set up ethnic-oriented businesses, such as hair salons, clothing shops, and restaurants with a mostly Habesha customer base.

== Religion ==
Religious divisions among migrants from Eritrea follow ethnic lines. Most of the Tigrayans are members of the Eritrean Orthodox Tewahedo Church while most but not all of the Tigre people, Bilen people and the Nara people are followers of Islam. The Rashaida people, Afar people and the Saho people are almost all followers of Islam. The Kunama people follow Traditional African religions however some are Christian.

== Notable people ==
- Fessehaie Abraham, first Eritrean Australian ambassador
- Michael Adonai, artist
- Berhan Ahmed, social activist
- Golgol Mebrahtu, football player

== See also ==
- African Australians
- Eritrean Americans
