= American Australians =

Australian citizens of American descent

Total population
- American; 77,010 (by birth, 2011 census); 62,960 (by ancestry, 2011 census)

Regions with significant populations
- Sydney, Melbourne, Brisbane, Perth, Adelaide, Canberra

Languages
- Australian English · American English

Related ethnic groups
- African Americans · European Americans · Hispanic and Latino Americans · Asian Americans · Native Americans · Pacific Islander Americans

American Australians are Australian citizens who are of American descent, including immigrants and residents who are descended from migrants from the United States of America and its territories. This includes people of European, African American, Native American, Hispanic or Latin American, Asian, and Pacific Islander backgrounds.

== Demography ==
People born in the United States as a percentage of the population in Australia divided geographically by statistical local area, as of the 2011 census

Number of permanent settlers arriving in Australia from the US since 1991 (monthly)

At the 2006 Australian Census, 71,718 Australian residents declared that they were American-born. Concentrations of American-born residents were in Sydney (16,339), Melbourne (11,130), Brisbane (6,057), Perth (5,558), Adelaide (2,862), and Canberra (1,970). At that census, residents could declare up to two ancestries: of the 56,283 respondents declaring American ancestry, 3,901 also declared Hispanic ancestry; 1,798, African American; 3,936, North American Indian; and 224, Puerto Rican.

== Community history ==
The first North Americans to land in Australia were British crewmen from the Endeavour under Captain Cook, who sojourned at Botany Bay in 1770. Once a permanent colony was established in New South Wales, "trade links were developed almost exclusively with North America."

The North American colonies, including what are now Canada and the United States, had been used by Britain for penal transportation. With the recognition of the independence of the United States in the 1780s, the British Government sought new lands to exile convicts, and Australia became the pre-eminent prison colony of the British Empire.

From the 1770s to the 1840s, North Americans settled in Australia primarily as demobilised British soldiers and sailors; as convicts (some United States citizens were arrested at sea for maritime offences, tried, convicted, and transported); and as whalers, sealers, or itinerants. Many of these settlers moved on to New Zealand for a time, and often returned to New South Wales. African Americans had a noted presence in the earliest British outposts in Australia, usually after a period of service in the British Navy.

The discovery of gold in New South Wales in 1851 caused a massive influx of prospectors. Experienced gold diggers came from California, where gold had been discovered in 1848. Many others came from the Australian colonies, Britain and the British Empire, and China. Some from the United States played eminent roles in the Eureka Stockade, particularly in the miners' paramilitary self-defence groups. The colonial authorities suspected the American-born and others, such as the Irish, of promoting republicanism.

At the time of Federation, in 1901, there were 7,448 United States-born persons in Australia. About this time, many of these American-Australians worked in the labour movement, including the formation of trade unions and the Australian Labor Party (hence the spelling of Labor in the American way instead of the more common Labour; both spellings were acceptable in Australian English at the time). Despite North American socio-cultural influences, Australian public opinion was wary of the United States: the visit of the "Great White Fleet" of the United States Navy to Sydney and Melbourne in 1908 was greeted with fanfare, but provoked immediate comment that the (British) Royal Navy should make an even greater show of force to restate in the strongest military terms Australia's position as the south-eastern guarantor of the British Empire.

During the Second World War, more than a million United States soldiers were stationed, not all simultaneously, in Australia at the request of the Australian Government after the surrender of the British garrison in Singapore to the Japanese in 1941. When the war ended, 7,000 Australian women migrated to the United States as war brides, and 2500 American soldiers settled in Australia, including exwar husbands.

The ANZUS Treaty, binding the United States, Australia, and New Zealand, was signed in 1951, locking the three countries into a mutual defence pact. This increased social and political ties between Australia and the United States and led Australia and New Zealand to commit soldiers to the Vietnam War in the 1960s and 1970s. These connections, along with increased worldwide travel, prompted more Americans to migrate permanently; in 1971 there were 39,035 United States–born residents in Australia.

== Education ==
The American International School of Sydney is defunct.

== Notable people ==
Name	Born – died	Notable for	Connection with Australia	Connection with United States
Aaron Baddeley	1981–	golf player	moved to Australia when 2 years old; raised in Australia	born in Lebanon, New Hampshire
Carsten Ball	1987–	tennis player	raised in Australia	born in Newport Beach, California
Duncan Ball	1941–	author	moved to Australia in 1974; naturalised Australian in 1980	born in Boston, Massachusetts
Cate Blanchett	1969–	actress	born and raised in Australia	father Robert DeWitt Blanchett, Jr was an American from Texas
Betty Bobbitt	1939–2020	actress and author	moved to Australia in 1962	born in Philadelphia, Pennsylvania
Jonah Bolden	1996–	basketball player	born and raised in Australia	father Bruce Bolden is an African American who played in the NBL and still lives in Australia
Chelsea Brown	1946–2017	comedian and actress	moved to Australia in 1977; married to actor Vic Rooney until his death in 2002	born in Chicago, Illinois
Cal Bruton	1954–	basketball player and coach	moved to Australia in 1979; naturalised 1983; played for the men's national team and named to the NBL 25th Anniversary Team in 2003.	born in New York City, New York; played college basketball at Wichita State University
C. J. Bruton	1975–	basketball player	moved to Australia with his father Cal in 1979; naturalised along with his father; played for the men's national team	son of Cal Bruton; born in Wichita, Kansas while his father was playing at Wichita State
John Butler	1975–	musician, founder John Butler Trio	Australian father; moved to Australia in 1986	born in Torrance, California
Arthur Calwell	1896-1973	Australian politician	born in Australia	parental grandfather is American
Kate Ceberano	1966–	actress and singer	born and raised in Australia	her father Tino Ceberano is American of Filipino Hawaiian descent
Didier Cohen	1985–	artists and repertoire (a&r), media personality, actor, and model	raised in Australia	born in Los Angeles
Toni Collette	1972–	actress, producer, and singer	born and raised in Australia	her biological paternal grandfather was American
Mason Cox	1991–	Football Player (AFL)	Moved to Australia to play AFL for Collingwood	Born and raised in Texas
Tanzyn Crawford	2000–	actress	born in Perth	father is American
Bruce Djite	1987–	football (soccer) player	moved to Australia when 3 years old; raised in Australia	born in Arlington County, Virginia
Aisha Dee	1993–	actress, and singer	born in Australia; Australian mother	father is African American
Joe Dolce	1947–	singer/songwriter, poet, and essayist	relocated to Melbourne, Australia, in 1978	born in Painesville, Ohio, to Italian-American parents
Dante Exum	1995–	basketball player	born and raised in Australia	father Cecil Exum is an African American who played in the NBL and still lives in Australia
Mel Gibson	1956–	actor and director	moved to Australia when 12 years old; paternal grandmother was Australian; honorary Officer of the Order of Australia	born Peekskill, New York and holds dual US and Irish citizenships
Virginia Giuffre	1983-2025	advocate and campaigner for survivors of sex trafficking	moved to Australia at the age of 19 in 2002 with her Australian husband; became a naturalised Australian citizen at an unspecified date	born in Sacramento, California, United States to American parents
Deni Gordon		actress and performer	moved to Australia in 1969	born in Boston, Massachusetts, to African-American parents
Ricky Grace	1966–	basketball player	moved to Australia in 1990; naturalised c. 1996; played for the men's national team and named to the NBL 25th Anniversary Team.	born in Dallas, Texas; played college basketball at the University of Oklahoma
Bill Hayden	1933–2024	Australian politician, former Governor-General	born in Australia	father is American
Colleen Hewett	1950–	singer and actress	born and raised in Australia	her family on her maternal side are of African American descent; great-great-grandfather is a native of Guayana
Marcia Hines	1953–	singer and actress	moved to Australia in 1969; member of the Order of Australia (naturalised 1994)	born in Boston, Massachusetts
Deni Hines	1970–	singer and actress	born in Australia	Daughter of Marcia Hines; Father is of Somalian/Ethiopian descent
Kyrie Irving	1992–	basketball player	born in Australia; family returned to the U.S. when 2 years old	parents are American
Terri Irwin	1964–	Zoologist, naturalist, author and television presenter	wife of Steve Irwin. Moved to Australia in 1992; naturalised in 2009 three years after her husband's death	born in Eugene, Oregon
Bindi Irwin	1998–	Singer, actress, conservationist and television personality	born in Australia	daughter of Terri and Steve Irwin
Robert Irwin	2003–	Conservationist and television personality	born in Australia	son of Terri and Steve Irwin
Nia Jax	1984–	professional wrestler	born in Australia	raised in Hawaii
Maya Joint	2006–	tennis	father is Australian	born in Grosse Pointe, Michigan
Aku Kadogo		choreographer, director, actress, and educator	educated and performed in Australia	born, and grew up in Detroit, Michigan.
Kristina Keneally	1968–	Premier of New South Wales 2009–2011, Senator 2018—2022	moved to Australia in 1994; naturalised Australian in 2000	born Kristina Marie Kerscher in Las Vegas, Nevada to American father and Australian mother
Nicole Kidman	1967–	actress	dual citizen by descent (Australian parents)	dual citizen by birth (born in Honolulu, Hawaii)
Don Lane	1933–2009	TV presenter, cabaret performer	moved to Australia 1965	born Morton Donald Isaacson in New York City, New York
Cheltzie Lee	1993–	figure skater	born in Australia	mother is American
Leroy Loggins	1957–	basketball player	as an Australian citizen competed in the 1992 Olympic Games	born New Brunswick, New Jersey
Bob Meyer	1932–2009	logician	moved to Australia 1974	born in US
King O'Malley	1858–1953	Australian politician	lived in Australia from 1888	claimed to have been born in Canada, more likely that he was born in US
Mike Nahan	1950–	Australian politician	moved to Australia in 1978; naturalised Australian in 1988	born in Ann Arbor, Michigan
Inde Navarrette	2001–	Actress	mother is Australian	born in Tucson, Arizona
Caleb Patterson-Sewell	1987–	football (soccer) player	moved to Australia when 2 years old; raised in Australia	born in Hendersonville, Tennessee to American father and Australian mother
Don Pyke	1968–	Australian rules footballer	father is Australian	born in Bloomington, Illinois
James Mahmud Rice	1972–	sociologist	raised in Australia	born in Honolulu, Hawaii to American father and Indonesian mother
Peter Ruehl	1947–2011	journalist and television news personality	moved to Australia in 1987	born in New York City, New York
Penny Sackett	1956–	astronomer	moved to Australia in 2002; naturalised Australian in 2008	born Lincoln, Nebraska
Brian Schmidt	1967–	astrophysicist	moved to Australia 1994, co-winner of the Nobel Prize in Physics 2011	born Missoula, Montana
Jon Hunter Spence	1945–2011	Jane Austen scholar	became an Australian citizen in 2011	born Camilla, Georgia
Ben Simmons	1996–	basketball player	born and raised in Australia	his father Dave Simmons is an African American who played in the NBL and still lives in Australia
Archie Smith	1995–	football player (AFL)	born and raised in Australia	his father is Andre Moore is an African American who played in the NBL and still lives in Australia
Chris Snelling	1981–	baseball player	raised in Australia	born North Miami, Florida
Irwin Thomas	1971–	singer-songwriter and guitarist	mother was an Australian-born folk singer and dancer; she returned to Australia in 1980, with her son.	born in 1971 in Manhattan, New York City.
Taren Stinebrickner-Kauffman	1981–	Noted political activist	born in Australia	dual citizen
Sanford Wheeler	1970–2020	Australian rules footballer	migrated to Australia in 1975	born in US to Australian father and American mother
Lydia Williams	1988–	football (soccer) player	born in Australia	mother is American
Makenzie Vega	1994–	actress	moved to Australia in 2016, married to model Blair Norfolk	born in Los Angeles, California, sister of Alexa Vega
Leila George	1992–	actress	born in Sydney; mother is Australian Greta Scacchi	father is American Vincent D'Onofrio; dual U.S. and Australian citizen
Bert McCracken	1982–	musician	moved to Australia in 2004 married to Alison Schneider	born in Provo, Utah,United States to American parents
Logan Huffman	1989–	actor	move in Australia dual U.S. citizen married to the veronicas Lisa Origliasso	born in Noblesville, Indiana,
Mark Webber	1980–	actor and director	dual U.S.citizen married to actress Teresa Palmer	born in Minneapolis, Minnesota
Brent DeBoer	1967–	musician	dual U.S.citizen	born in Portland, Oregon
Brooke Harman	1985–	actress	Mother is Australian	born in Orange County, California
Kenneth Moraleda	1973–	actor	educated and performed in Australia	born in Cambridge, Massachusetts, to Filipino American parents
Orlando Jordan	1974–	actor, stuntman, and semi-retired American professional wrestler	dual U.S. citizen	born in Salem, New Jersey
Diesel	1966–	singer-songwriter and musician	emigrated to Australia with his family, in November 1971	born in Fall River, Massachusetts
Nicholas Hammond	1950–	actor and writer	moved to Australia in the mid-1980s	born in Washington, D.C.
Kate Walsh	1967–	actress and businesswoman	moved to Australia in 2020	born in San Jose, California
Jim Knobeloch	1950–	actor	moved to Australia in 2001	born in Belleville, Illinois
Jane Badler	1953–	Actress and singer	moved to Australia in the mid 80s or 90s	born in Brooklyn, New York City

== See also ==
- African Australians
- American Canadians
- American New Zealanders
- Asian Australians
- Australian Americans
- Australia–United States relations
- European Australians
- Europeans in Oceania
- Immigration to Australia
- Latin American Australians
- Arab Australians
- Black Australians
- Caribbean and West Indian Australians
- European Australians
- Indigenous Australians
- North African and Middle Eastern Australians
