= Congolese people in Italy =

Total population
- 7,066 (11,000 estimated in 2018) (ISTAT: 2014)

Regions with significant populations
- Lazio; Lombardy; Piedmont

Languages
- Italian; French; Kongo; Lingala; • Swahili

Religion
- Protestantism; Catholic Church

Related ethnic groups
- Afro-Italians • French Congolese

Congolese people in Italy consist of migrants from Democratic Republic of the Congo and Republic of the Congo and their descendants living and working in Italy. The presence of Congoleses in Italy dates back to the 1980s.

== Numbers ==
In 2014 in Italy there are 7,066 regular immigrants from Democratic Republic of the Congo and Republic of the Congo. In 2018 there are estimated to be 11,000 Congolese people, mainly from the Democratic Republic of the Congo. In 2006 there were 6,167. The three cities with most number of Congoleses are: Rome, Turin and Padua.

== See also ==
- Congolese people in France
- Congolese people in Switzerland
- Congolese people in Germany
- Congolese people in Belgium
- Congolese people in the Netherlands
- Congolese people in Denmark
- Congolese people in Norway
- Congolese people in Sweden
- Congolese in the United Kingdom
- Congolese Americans
- Congolese Canadians
- Congolese Australians
