= Congolese Americans =

Americans of Congolese birth or descent

Total population
- By ancestry or ethnic origin: 145,768 (2024 ACS); Congolese-born: 105,000 (2023 ACS)

Regions with significant populations
- Texas (especially the Dallas–Fort Worth Metroplex followed by the Houston Metropolitan Area), Georgia (Atlanta Metropolitan Area), Arizona (especially in the Phoenix Metropolitan Area and Tucson), Kentucky, North Carolina, Illinois, Ohio, California (SoCal), New York, and Michigan. Other communities to be found in Iowa, Missouri, Pennsylvania, Tennessee, Florida (Tampa–St. Petersburg area), Connecticut, and Washington.

Languages
- American English, French, Congolese Swahili, Lingala, Kikongo, Tshiluba

Religion
- Christianity (Protestantism, Catholicism, and Kimbanguism)

Related ethnic groups
- African Americans

Congolese Americans (French: Congolo-Américains) are Americans descended from the peoples of the Democratic Republic of the Congo and the Republic of the Congo, which consist of hundreds of ethnic groups.

In the 2024 American Community Survey, 145,768 people reported Congolese descent, reflecting significant growth in the community. Rose Mapendo, who suffered as a result of the war, helped 2,000 refugees to emigrate into the U.S. through the organization Mapendo International. In 2013, roughly 10,000 refugees from the DRC were living in the U.S.

== History ==
Like other Central/West African groups in the United States, the first Congolese arrived as enslaved people in the modern-day United States as part of the Atlantic slave trade. Congolese were most likely sold in Cabinda in modern-day Angola and were then imported to places such as Louisiana and South Carolina. However, due to the difficulty of tracing specific ancestry through the Atlantic slave trade and the lack of records on specific geographic origins of slaves, very few descendants of enslaved Congolese today identify specifically as Congolese Americans.

In the 1960s, Congolese gradually began to voluntarily migrate to the U.S. for educational reasons. However, in the 1980s, the first large wave of Congolese immigrants came to the U.S. for educational purposes. Initially, most of them decided to return home when they finished their studies in the U.S. However, many of them chose to stay in the U.S. due to the worsening political and economic situation in the DRC. The First Congo War (1996–97) in the DRC drove many Congolese to leave their families at home to seek asylum in the U.S. as war refugees. Only a few families migrated to the U.S. together. Some refugees were Tutsi who sought refuge from the Rwandan genocide in the DRC before arriving in the U.S.

== Demography ==
The modern-day Republic of the Congo and the DRC were both colonized by Francophone powers, the former by France and the latter by Belgium. Thus, many Congolese speak French in addition to English and several Bantu languages. Immigrants from the DRC speak Lingala, Swahili, Kikongo, Bembe, and Tshiluba. However, recent immigrants are less likely to speak English than the better-educated Congolese migrants before them, and thus, have more difficulty adjusting to daily living in the U.S. Still, U.S. employers do not always accept the professional expertise and education that immigrants received in the Congo. Thus, many educated Congolese have been forced to work in unskilled and low-paying jobs such as dishwashing and taxi cab driving. Most Congolese are Christians.

According to the US Census Bureau in 2023, 62,547 people from the Democratic Republic of Congo and 43,066 from the Republic of Congo lived in the United States in that year.

A significant number of Congolese Americans reside in the Charlotte and Raleigh areas of North Carolina, in the Dallas–Fort Worth metroplex in Texas (mainly in Arlington, Bedford, Dallas, Euless, Grand Prairie, Hurst, and Irving); in the Cleveland and Columbus areas of Ohio; and in Iowa, where the Congolese community of DRC this growing due to sending refugees (although quantitatively reduced in the last years.) There is also a growing population of Congolese in Portland, Maine (with 1,379 self reporting as Congolese alone in Cumberland County as of 2020.) Additionally, most of the refugees in Tallahassee, Florida, are from the Democratic Republic of Congo.

Since 2001, many refugees from the DRC have resettled in the United States. In 2013, it was estimated that more than 10,000 refugees from the DRC live in the U.S., of which more than 3,000 arrived in the U.S. in 2010. The U.S. had hoped to resettle tens of thousands more from the DRC over the next five years. There is a growing Congolese refugee population in Memphis, Tennessee, and other cities in the state. In Kentucky, thousands of Congolese have settled in Louisville and other cities. In Bowling Green, Kentucky, Congolese refugees already compose a sizable proportion of the city.

Texas has the highest number of immigrants from the Republic of the Congo at 6,230. Immigrants from the Republic of Congo took up the largest share of a state's population in Kentucky at 0.041%. As of 2023, the Top 10 cities with the most immigrants from the Republic of the Congo were as follows:

City	State	Immigrants from Congo	% of Immigrants from Congo
Charlotte	North Carolina	1,793	0.207%
Louisville	Kentucky	942	0.149%
Raleigh	North Carolina	910	0.197%
Dallas	Texas	854	0.066%
Irving	Texas	727	0.286%
Amarillo	Texas	714	0.356%
Fort Worth	Texas	693	0.076%
Houston	Texas	655	0.029%
Abilene	Texas	651	0.519%
Lexington	Kentucky	632	0.197%

Texas has the highest number of immigrants from the Democratic Republic of the Congo (DRC), formerly known as Zaire, at 5,580. Immigrants from the DRC took up the largest share of a state's population in Iowa at 0.12%. As of 2023, the Top 10 cities with the most immigrants from the DRC were as follows:

City	State	Immigrants from DRC	% of Immigrants from DRC
Charlotte	North Carolina	1,847	0.214%
Lexington	Kentucky	1,373	0.427%
Nashville	Tennessee	1,154	0.169%
Houston	Texas	1,020	0.044%
Louisville	Kentucky	997	0.158%
Waterloo	Iowa	975	1.440%
Portland	Maine	967	1.421%
Buffalo	New York	874	0.317%
Phoenix	Arizona	818	0.051%
Irving	Texas	757	0.298%

== Organizations ==
Congolese Community of Chicago aims to facilitate the integration of people of Congolese descent into the American tapestry while running programs to educate others about Congolese culture.

Congolese Community of North Carolina-Raleigh (COCOM-NC-Raleigh) provides educational opportunities for Congolese children and their families in North Carolina's Research Triangle.

Congolese Women Association of New England provides immigration counseling, job training, ESL classes, and cultural practice workshops to Congolese women in New England.

Other organizations include the Salem Gospel Ministries in the DC area, Congolese Community of Houston, and Congolese Community of Northern California.

== Notable people ==
Democratic Republic of the Congo

- Ota Benga
- Nansha Kalonji
- Hakeem Kashama
- Réjane Magloire
- Emmanuel Mudiay
- Dikembe Mutombo
- Mboka Mwilambwe
- Mary Ngwanda Georges
- Joy Reid
- Prince Shembo
- Sandra Uwiringiyimana
- Philippe Wamba

Republic of the Congo

- Dwight Hardy
- Sammus

== See also ==
- Congo Square
- Wanderer
- Congolese people in France
- Congolese people in Italy
- Congolese in the United Kingdom
- Congolese Australians
- Democratic Republic of the Congo–United States relations
- Republic of the Congo–United States relations
