= Ghanaian Australians =

Total population
- 3,521 (by ancestry, 2011)

Regions with significant populations
- Mainly in New South Wales

Languages
- English · French · Ghanaian languages

Related ethnic groups
- Other African Australians, Ivorian Australians, Burkinabe Australians, Togolese Australians

Ghanaian Australians are Australian citizens and residents of Ghanaian origin and descent. More than 50% of those who are Ghana-born live in Sydney.

== Background ==
The Special Commonwealth African Assistance Plan allowed students from West African countries, including from Ghana, to come to Australia the mid-1960s. More than 70 per cent of these students remained in Australia following military coups in their countries. While small in number, the Ghana-born steadily increased from the mid-1970s following the easing of immigration restrictions. The majority of Ghanaian Australians are skilled and educated, with 70.6% of the Ghana-born aged 15 years and over possessing higher non-school qualifications, compared to 55.9% of the Australian population.

== Population ==
The 2011 Census noted there were 3,866 Ghana-born people in Australia. Akan, Ewe and Ga all have many speakers in Australia. Akan has over 2,100 speakers and Ewe has over 400 speakers. Some of the over 10,700 Australian-born who speak an African language may also speak a Ghanaian language.

It was noted in 2014 that the Ghanaian student population in Australia (like the Nigerian one) was growing fast to the extent that Australian universities were keen to attract more students from Ghana.

African restaurants serving up Ghanaian specialties can be found in Sydney.

== Ghanaian Australians ==
- Randy Borquaye - Musician, teacher and pioneer of the Afro-Reggae genre in Australia with band Randy & the Jah Roots
- Faustina Agolley – TV presenter and host
- Kwabena Appiah-Kubi – soccer player for Western Sydney Wanderers
- Selasi Berdie – professional rugby league footballer for the Gold Coast Titans
- Manu Crooks – rapper
- Kofi Danning – soccer player who has played for Australia internationally
- Dorinda Hafner – celebrity chef, community activist and TV personality
- Nuala Hafner – news reader and TV personality
- Citizen Kay – rapper
- Miracle – rapper
- Matt Okine – Triple J host, actor, comedian, The Project regular; of Ghanaian descent
- Genesis Owusu – singer
- Isaac Quaynor – AFL footballer (Collingwood Magpies)
- Joel Amartey - AFL footballer (Sydney Swans)
- Brandon Walker – AFL footballer (Fremantle Dockers)
- Kwame Yeboah – soccer player
- Vida Sunshyne - Rapper, Singer-Songwriter, Dancer, Performing Artist and Host.
