= African Australians =

Australians of Sub-Saharan African descent

Total population
- 326,673 (2021 census); 1.3% of Australia's population

Regions with significant populations
Victoria	90,640	(1.47%)
New South Wales	75,942	(1.02%)
Western Australia	66,744	(2.61%)
Queensland	64,112	(1.32%)
South Australia	17,607	(1.03%)
Northern Territory	2,660	(1.08%)
Australian Capital Territory	5,504	(1.37%)
Tasmania	3,434	(0.66%)

Languages
- Australian English; African languages

Religion
- Christianity; Islam; traditional African religions

African Australians are Australians descended from any peoples of Sub-Saharan Africa, including naturalised Australians who are immigrants from various regions in Sub-Saharan Africa and descendants of such immigrants. At the 2021 census, the number of ancestry responses categorised within Sub-Saharan African ancestral groups as a proportion of the total population amounted to 1.3%. Note that Australian official statistics are based on country of origin not race; hence, Sub-Saharan African immigrants of European descent (such as White South Africans) and their descendants are included as African Australians.

Large-scale immigration from the regions of Africa south of the Sahara to Australia is only a recent phenomenon, with Europe and Asia traditionally being the largest sources of migration to Australia. African Australians come from diverse ethnic, cultural, linguistic, religious, educational and employment backgrounds.

== History ==
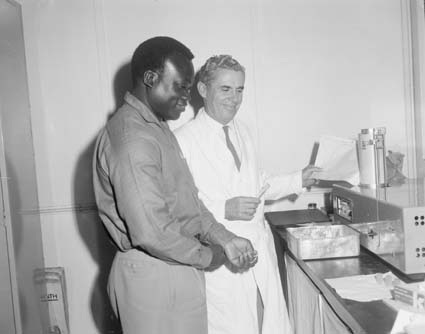
An agricultural officer from Ghana visiting Queensland under the Special Commonwealth African Assistance Plan, 1962

Large-scale immigration from the regions of Africa south of the Sahara to Australia is only a recent phenomenon, with Europe and Asia traditionally being the largest sources of migration to Australia.

Coins minted by the Tanzanian medieval kingdom of Kilwa Sultanate have been found on the Wessel Islands. They are the oldest foreign artefacts ever discovered in Australia. Other people descended from African emigrants later arrived indirectly via the First Fleet and 19th century multicultural maritime industry. Notable examples are Billy Blue, John Caesar, and Black Jack Anderson.

Migrants from Mauritius have also been arriving in Australia since before federation in 1901. They came as convicts, prospectors who sought Victoria's goldfields, or skilled sugar workers who significantly helped to develop Queensland's sugar industry.

Following the 1823 Demerara Slave Rebellion in British Guiana, several hundreds of enslaved Africans who had participated in the rebellion were deported to Queensland, Australia.

The Special Commonwealth African Assistance Plan enabled students from British Commonwealth African countries, including from Ghana, to travel to Australia during the mid-1960s. More than 70 percent of those from West African countries remained in Australia following military coup d'états in their countries of birth.

However, immigration from Sub-Saharan Africa to Australia generally remained limited until the 1990s, thus compared to other established European and American countries, African Australian community remains new in the country itself.

In 2005–06, permanent settler arrivals to Australia included 4,000 South Africans and 3,800 Sudanese, constituting the sixth and seventh largest sources of migrants, respectively.

== Demographics ==
African Australians are Australians of direct Sub-Saharan African ancestry. They are from diverse racial, cultural, linguistic, religious, educational and employment backgrounds. The majority (72.6%) of African emigrants to Australia are from southern and eastern Africa. The Australian Bureau of Statistics classifies all residents into cultural and ethnic groups according to geographical origin.

=== Migration streams ===
People of South African ancestry whose parents were both born in Australia as a fraction of total residents

Some of the most significant migration streams as of 2011-2012 were as follows:

- Other immigrants from sub-Saharan Africa arrived via humanitarian programs, mostly from East Africa. In the 2011–2012 fiscal year, these individuals were mainly from Burundi (44/79), Congo (143/158), the Democratic Republic of the Congo (370/454), Eritrea (244/294), Malawi (57/71), Rwanda (44/62), and Tanzania (40/67).
- Additionally, other immigrants from sub-Saharan Africa arrived through a family reunion migration stream. In the 2011–2012 fiscal year, these individuals were primarily from Ethiopia (412/802), Ghana (152/202), Guinea (33/62), Liberia (82/129), Sierra Leone (106/140), Somalia (164/420), and Uganda (37/67).
- A significant number of sub-Saharan African migrants have come to Australia through a skilled migration stream. In the 2011–2012 fiscal year, these individuals were chiefly from Kenya (188/415), Mauritius (228/303), Nigeria (126/250), South Africa (4,239/6,307), Zambia (35/115), and Zimbabwe (467/848).
- Some sub-Saharan African immigrants have also arrived via a secondary migration from New Zealand, where they are citizens.

== Broadcasting services for Sub-Saharan African migrants ==
Multicultural broadcaster Special Broadcasting Service (SBS) broadcasts in five African languages on radio, including Nuer and Dinka of South Sudan, Swahili of Tanzania and the African Great Lakes region, Tigrinya of Eritrea and Amharic of Ethiopia. Arabic broadcasting began with a 6am service by SBS in 1975, and from 2016, SBS began a year-long trial of SBS Arabic, a 24/7 digital radio station and website. It continues today and includes an Arabic podcast. An English language program, simply called SBS African (nicknamed the African Hour) was broadcast until 2017, when it was cut from schedule. 2ME Radio Arabic also broadcasts in Arabic throughout Australia.

== Social status ==
As sub-Saharan Africans only began to migrate to Australia in larger numbers much later than sub-Saharan Africans were brought to the United States as slaves, and those who settled in parts of Europe, African Australian status is largely a new challenge for Australian authorities, and it is acknowledged that widespread racism against sub-Saharan Africans is not uncommon in Australia.

=== Relationship to Indigenous Australians ===
The concept of how the American notion of "blackness" was adopted and adapted by Aboriginal civil rights activists has been little known or understood in the US. In 2011, the Museum of Contemporary African Diasporan Arts in New York mounted an exhibition of Indigenous Australian art, concerned with making connections between the current civil rights and spiritual movements of Indigenous Australians and that of black people in America and elsewhere.

A 2012 study looked at attitudes towards African immigrants in Western Australia, based on a survey of 184 Australians, examining the quantitative data for use in developing strategies to combat prejudice, and the media's role in the development of negative attitudes. It compared the results of the study with those previously found in looking at attitudes towards Indigenous and Muslim Australians.

Natasha Guantai, in response to Roxane Gay's initial implication that the only "black people" in Australia would be of sub-Saharan African descent, wrote "In the dominant Australian narrative, blacks are regarded as Aboriginal. This is a narrative with little space for non-Indigenous black Australians". Guantai goes on to highlight some differences in the experience of the various groups - Indigenous Australians, immigrants from sub-Saharan Africa, the black descendants of settlers, and black people who arrive from other white-majority countries such as the UK or the US.

In 2018 Kaiya Aboagye, a PhD student of Ghanaian, Aboriginal, South Sea and Torres Strait Islander heritage, underlined the African connection to Aboriginal Australians, citing "long histories of African/Indigenous relationships both inside and outside Australia", despite the many and varied origins and experiences of blackness among peoples in the Global South.

=== Relationship with the criminal justice system ===
In 2021, it was reported that African Australians, predominantly of South Sudanese descent, comprised 19 percent of young people in custody in Victoria, despite making up less than 0.5 percent of the overall population. Previously, in 2013 Victoria Police settled a racial profiling complaint lodged by members of the African community by agreeing to review its procedures. A 2020 study in the Australian and New Zealand Journal of Criminology found that South Sudanese-born individuals were significantly overrepresented in as perpetrators of "crimes against the person", such as robbery and assault, but that "rates for less serious crimes, such as public order and drug offences, have remained stable and relatively low for South Sudanese-born youth".

==== Organised crime ====
In 2016, the Liberal Party began to campaign against what it identified as "South Sudanese gangs" in Melbourne, following riots at the Moomba Festival in the city. This campaign was criticised by local community leaders, and the Australian Greens MP Adam Bandt said it was using "race to win votes and whip up hatred". South Sudanese Australians commit around 1% of crime in Melbourne, which is higher than their share of the population (0.14%), but is not adjusted for the low average age of the South Sudanese-born population, which can account for their over-representation in the statistics.

In 2018, then-Prime Minister Malcolm Turnbull described the supposed presence of South Sudanese gangs in Melbourne as a "real concern", with then-Home Affairs Minister Peter Dutton claiming that Melburnians were afraid to leave their homes at night due to gang-related violence. Then-Victorian Premier Daniel Andrews rejected Turnbull's comments.

The debate on "African gangs" in Melbourne was a key part in the Victorian Liberal Party's campaign for the 2018 state election under then-Opposition Leader Matthew Guy.

Criminologists and the police commissioners of Melbourne say that episodes of youth criminality occurring in Melbourne do not amount to "gang activity" or organised crime, according to the definition used by law enforcement. The debate around so-called "African gangs" was highly racialised and resulted in many examples of racist discourse on social media, leading Anthony Kelly, executive officer of Melbourne's Flemington and Kensington Community Legal Centre, to describe it as a "racialised moral panic". The aftermath of the panic caused black people in Melbourne to fear that they would be arrested simply for congregating in public spaces, with South Sudanese people reporting high levels of targeting by police.

== African Australian identity ==
African Australian identity is the objective or subjective state of perceiving oneself as an African Australian and as relating to being African Australian. As a group identity, "African Australian" can denote pan-African ethnic identity, as well as a diasporic identity in relation to the perception of Africa as a homeland.

== Notable African Australians ==
This list includes only individuals who immigrated directly from sub-Saharan Africa to Australia, plus those who had an immediate ancestor who made such a migration. Individuals of sub-Saharan African origin who migrated from non-African countries, or those whose entire sub-Saharan African ancestry stems from such migration, are not included.

In recent years, African Australian soccer players have been prominent in men's soccer in Australia, with 34 players making an appearance in the 2020-2021 A-League season, up on 26 the previous year. These include Kusini Yengi and his brother, Tete Yengi, from South Sudan, and their friends, brothers Mohamed and Al Hassan Toure.

- Abebe Fekadu
- Adut Akech
- Aisha Dee
- Ajak Deng
- Akmal Saleh
- Al Hassan Toure
- Albert Bensimon
- Alex Brosque
- Aliir Aliir
- Alou Kuol
- Anton Enus
- Ariel Kaplan
- Ater Majok
- Audius Mtawarira
- Aweng Chuol
- Awer Mabil
- Ben Simmons
- Berhan Ahmed
- Bernie Ibini-Isei
- Bronte Campbell
- Bruce Djite
- C.J. Bruton
- Cate Campbell
- Changkuoth Jiath
- Citizen Kay
- Cleopatra Coleman
- Daine Laurie
- Dane Haylett-Petty
- Danté Exum
- Dash Daniels
- David Gonski
- Dena Kaplan
- Deng Adel
- Dorinda Hafner
- Duckie Thot
- Dyson Daniels
- DyspOra
- Emelia Burns
- Ezi Magbegor
- Faustina Agolley
- Francis Awaritefe
- Garang Kuol
- Genesis Owusu
- George Gregan
- Golgol Mebrahtu
- Gout Gout
- Henry Ninio
- Heritier Lumumba
- Diafrix
- Isaka Cernak
- J. M. Coetzee
- Jake Adelson
- Jamal Idris
- Janine Murray
- Jason Geria
- Jessica Marais
- Jongkuch Mach
- Junior Madut
- Keiynan Lonsdale
- Kevin Parker
- Kofi Danning
- Kusini Yengi
- Kwabena Appiah
- Lovemore N'dou
- Lucas Herrington
- Majak Daw
- Majok Deng
- Majok Majok
- Mangok Mathiang
- Marnus Labuschagne
- Mathiang Muo
- Matisse Thybulle
- Michael Baden-Powell, 4th Baron Baden-Powell
- Mohamed Toure
- Moses Mbye
- Musa Toure
- Nathan Jawai
- Nathaniel Willemse
- Nestory Irankunda
- Nikolai Topor-Stanley
- Nuala Hafner
- Nyadiew Puoch
- Nyadol Nyuon
- Patrick Kisnorbo
- Patty Mills
- Rick Cosnett
- Sara Zwangobani
- Selwyn
- Sisonke Msimang
- Sophie Wilde
- Tammin Sursok
- Tando Velaphi
- Tanzyn Crawford
- Tendai Mzungu
- Tete Yengi
- Thatboykwame
- Thomas Deng
- Thon Maker
- Tim Omaji
- Tkay Maidza
- Troye Sivan
- Waleed Aly
- Yassmin Abdel-Magied
- Young Pluto

== See also ==
- African immigration to Europe
- American Australians, a category that includes Australians of African-American descent
- Arab Australians
- Black Australians (disambiguation)
- Congolese Australians
- Egyptian Australians
- Ethiopian Australians
- Ghanaian Australians
- Kenyan Australians
- Mauritian Australians
- Nigerian Australians
- Somali Australians
- South African Australians
- South Sudanese Australians
- Sudanese Australians
- Zimbabwean Australians
- Asian Australians
- Caribbean and West Indian Australians
- European Australians
- Indigenous Australians
- Latin American Australians
- North African and Middle Eastern Australians
