= Cuban Australians =

Cuban Australians Cubanos australianos
- (Cuba) (Australia)

Total population
- 2,165

Regions with significant populations
- Mainly in New South Wales and Queensland; Victoria (state); Western Australia; South Australia

Languages
- Australian English; Cuban Spanish

Related ethnic groups
- Caribbean and West Indian Australians

Cuban Australians (Spanish: cubanos australianos) are Australians whose full or partial ancestry can be traced back to Cuba.

2,165 Cuban Australians were residing in Australia as of 2024, of whom 1,050 had been born in Cuba, whereas some other 1,114 people include those who were born in Australia and those who were born elsewhere abroad and claimed either partial or full Cuban ancestry.

The Cuban immigration to Australia goes back to the early 1980s, to a point where millions of Cubans left Cuba during the takeover of Fidel Castro's regime for many other countries worldwide, of whom many have settled in Oceania, mainly in Australia.

Between 2018 and 2023, 71 new Cuban-born individuals were registered into the country, between 2023 and 2024, 30 new Cuban-born nationals were residing in the country, with major concentrations of settlement along the eastern coast.

Most Cuban Australians are concentrated in New South Wales, from the Greater Sydney area to Campbelltown, New South Wales, where are hosted the fastest growing populations, followed by the states of Queensland and Victoria (state), with the cities of Brisbane, Gold Coast, Queensland and Melbourne hosting other significant concentrations among all other surrounding areas.

Western Australia is ranked fourth state with a significant growing population of Cuban Australians, due to especially a significant number of Cubans who happen to be enrolled in the medication field.

== Demographics ==
According to a 2024 estimate, about a 1,000 and more Cuban Australians live in New South Wales, with major concentrations in the Greater Sydney area and overall the suburbs of Campbelltown, Mascot, Eastlakes, Rosemeadow, Glen Alpine and Bondi Junction.

About 500-600 and more Cuban Australians reside in Queensland, with major concentrations in Brisbane, especially in the suburb of Wacol along with neighboring ones, Sunshine Coast, mainly in the suburb of Alexandra Headland and on the Gold Coast.

An estimated 500 to 600 Cuban Australians reside in Victoria, primarily in Melbourne, where the population has grown rapidly.

Western Australia and South Australia also host growing populations.

== Cuban Australians ==
- Héctor Lombard, Australian mixed martial artist and bodybuilder
- Josh Mansour, former Australian professional rugby and football player of Portuguese descent through his mother from Portugal and Cuban along with Lebanese descent through his father from Lebanon
- Soledad O'Brien: American broadcast journalist and executive producer born to an Australian father and an Afro-Cuban mother
- Leo Lombard: professional Australian rules footballer who was selected by the Gold Coast Suns with pick 9 in the 2024 AFL draft born to a Cuban father and an English mother
- Peter Ruehl: Australian newspaper columnist of German, Cuban and Irish descent
- Paul Okon-Engstler: Australian professional soccer player born to a Cuban mom and an Aussie dad of German and Italian descent
- Gianluca Okon: Australian footballer of Cuban, German and Italian descent

== See also ==
- Hispanic and Latin American Australians
- Caribbean and West Indian Australians
