= Kenyan Australians =

Total population
- 22,348 (by birth)

Regions with significant populations
- Western Australia: 6,340
- Victoria: 5,141
- New South Wales: 4,207
- Queensland: 3,421
- South Australia: 2,180

Languages
- English · Swahili · · Kalenjin · Gujarati · Kikuyu · Dinka · Luo · Kamba language · Languages of Kenya

Religion
- Christianity · Islam · Hinduism · Other

Related ethnic groups
- African Australians, Ugandan Australians, Tanzanian Australians, South Sudanese Australians, Ethiopian Australians, Somali Australians

Kenyan Australians are Australian citizens and residents of Kenyan origin and descent. They may be of indigenous African, European, or Indian heritage.

== Background ==
Uncertainties about the future of colonial-run Kenya prompted many Kenyan-born settlers of both European and Indian backgrounds to migrate to other countries, including Australia. There are also many Swahili-speaking Kenyans of indigenous African ancestry. The majority of such migrants had no difficulty getting work and settling into the Australian community.

The majority of Kenyan Australians are skilled and educated, with 72.5% of the Kenyan-born aged 15 years and over possessing higher non-school qualifications, compared to 55.9% of the Australian population.

== Population ==
The 2016 Census noted there are 17,652 Kenya-born people in Australia. About one in five Australians who claim Kenyan ancestry live in Sydney.

=== Languages ===
The languages most commonly spoken at home by Kenyan-born Australians are English and Swahili, however Kikuyu, Luo, Kalenjin, Gujarati, Dinka and other languages are not uncommon. Kikuyu is a Kenyan language spoken by over one hundred Australians at home, and Luo is also spoken by about one hundred Australians.

About 5,000 Kenyan-born Australians speak a language indigenous to Africa at home. Some of the over 10,700 Australian-born who speak an African language may also speak a language of Kenya.

The 74 languages the Special Broadcasting Service broadcasts in includes Swahili and Dinka, both languages spoken by many Kenyan-born Australians.

== Notable people ==
- Mark Ochieng, footballer
- Former Senator Lucy Gichuhi, Family First Party politician
- Rashid Mahazi, footballer of Diaspora Coordinator

== See also ==
- African Australians
- Australia–Kenya relations
