= Mercedes Ruehl =

American actress (born 1948)

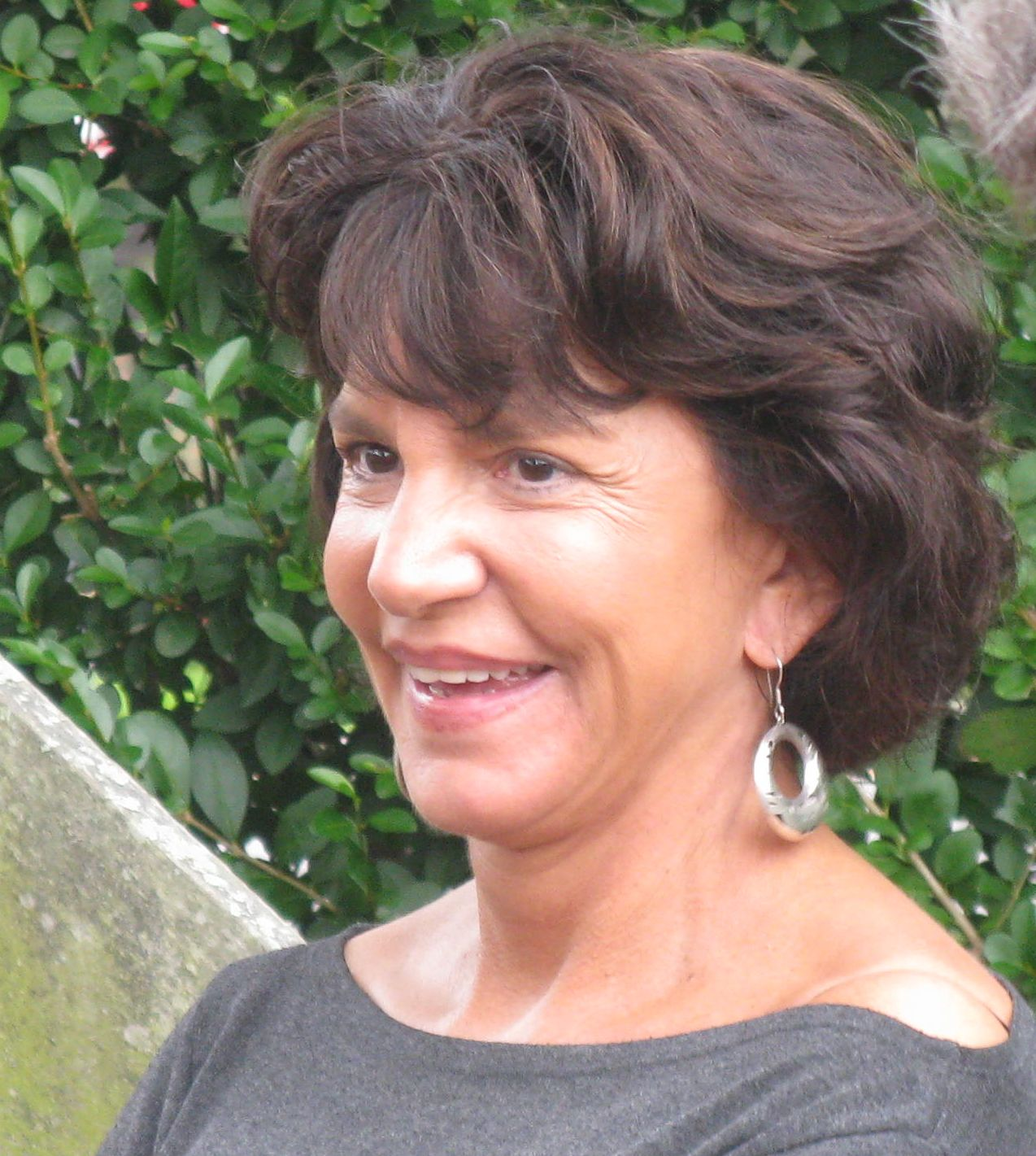
- Ruehl in 2009
- Born: February 28, 1948 (age 78); New York City, U.S.
- Education: College of New Rochelle (BA); Pacific Conservatory of the Performing Arts
- Occupation: Actress
- Years active: 1976–present
- Spouse: David Geiser (m. 1999; died 2020)
- Children: 2
- Relatives: Peter Ruehl (brother)

Mercedes J. Ruehl (/ruːl/ ROOL; born February 28, 1948) is an American screen, stage, and television actress. She is the recipient of several accolades, including an Academy Award, a Golden Globe Award, and a Tony Award.

Ruehl won the Academy Award for Best Supporting Actress for her role as video store owner and romantic interest in Terry Gilliam's fantasy comedy drama The Fisher King (1991). She also acted in the films The Warriors (1979), Heartburn (1986), 84 Charing Cross Road (1987), Big (1988), Married to the Mob (1988), Last Action Hero (1993), Indictment: The McMartin Trial (1995), Roseanna's Grave (1997), Gia (1998), The Minus Man (1999) and Hustlers (2019). On television, she had a recurring role as a radio station manager in the NBC sitcom Frasier from 1995 to 1996.

On stage, she made her Broadway debut in the Herb Gardner play I'm Not Rappaport (1985). She won the Tony Award for Best Actress in a Play for her role in the Neil Simon drama Lost in Yonkers (1991). She reprised the role in the 1993 film of the same name. She was further Tony-nominated for her performances in Michael Cristofer's The Shadow Box (1995) and Edward Albee's The Goat, or Who Is Sylvia? (2002). She has also acted in Broadway productions of The Rose Tattoo (1995), The American Plan (2009), and Torch Song (2017).

== Early life and education ==
Ruehl was born February 28, 1948, in Jackson Heights, Queens, New York City, to Mercedes J. Ruehl, a schoolteacher, and Vincent Ruehl, an FBI agent. Her father was of German and Irish descent and her mother was of Cuban and Irish descent. The family frequently moved during her childhood owing to Vincent Ruehl's assignments with the FBI, and lived in other states including Silver Spring, Maryland. She and her brother, Peter, were raised Roman Catholic.

She attended the College of New Rochelle and graduated in 1969 with a BA in English.

== Career ==
Ruehl began her acting career in New York City appearing in various off-off Broadway productions while working a variety of temping and waitressing jobs. She established herself in regional theatre with the Denver Center Theatre Company. In 1980, she was nearly cast in the sixth season of Saturday Night Live, losing her slot to Denny Dillon. Her first starring role on Broadway came in 1984's I'm Not Rappaport. She then went on to win an Obie Award for her performance in The Marriage of Bette and Boo and twenty years later, an Obie for Woman Before a Glass. She won the Drama Desk Award for Outstanding Actress in a Play and Tony Award for Best Actress in a Play for her performance as mentally challenged aunt Bella Kurnitz in Neil Simon's Lost in Yonkers, and continued her role in the show during its tour with co-star Mercedes McCambridge. Her performances in two other plays earned her two other Tony nominations: Best Featured Actress in a Play for her role as the trashy and devoted ex-wife Beverly in the revival of The Shadow Box; and Best Actress in a Play for her role as Stevie Gray in Edward Albee's The Goat, or Who is Sylvia?.

In 1996, she was mentioned in the Sheryl Crow song "A Change Would Do You Good". In 1999, they co-starred in the movie The Minus Man.

Her most acclaimed film role was in The Fisher King; for her performance as a strong-willed and pragmatic video store owner, she won the Academy Award for Best Supporting Actress, American Comedy Award, Boston Society of Film Critics Award, a Los Angeles Film Critics Association Award, and a Golden Globe. Earlier she had won the 1989 National Society of Film Critics Award for Best Supporting Actress for her performance in Married to the Mob. She played KACL station manager Kate Costas in five episodes of Frasier, and had a major role in the made-for-TV film All-American Girl: The Mary Kay Letourneau Story. In 2005, she (along with Esai Morales) received the Rita Moreno HOLA Award for Excellence from the Hispanic Organization of Latin Actors. She later played the mother of main character Vincent Chase in HBO's Entourage.

In 2009, she returned to the stage in Manhattan Theater Club's production of Richard Greenberg's The American Plan playing the role of Eva Adler. The production opened at the Samuel J. Friedman Theatre and the limited engagement ran from January 22 until March 22. In his rave review in The New York Times, Ben Brantley called Ruehl's performance "masterly". Ruehl next appeared in the drama/horror film What Ever Happened to Barker Daniels?, which was released in 2009. In January 2011, Ruehl starred in Sarah Treem's play The How and The Why, directed by Emily Mann at McCarter Theatre of Princeton University.

Ruehl appeared in the role of Ma in Harvey Fierstein's revamped and renamed revival of his play Torch Song off-Broadway at the Second Stage Theater. The play began previews on September 26, and opened officially on October 19, 2017. The production later transferred to Broadway.

Ruehl is on the faculty of HB Studio in New York City.

== Personal life ==
Ruehl had a son, Christopher, whom she placed for adoption in 1976 when she was 28. They were reunited in the late 1990s when he turned 21. In 1999, Ruehl married painter David Geiser with whom she adopted a son, Jake, (born 1995). Later Christopher became Jake's godfather. Ruehl and Geiser put their Hampton house on the market in 2017; the same year, Ruehl said that they were no longer together but remained close. Geiser died unexpectedly of heart disease in his sleep at home on October 14, 2020, at the age of 73.

Her brother, Peter, moved to Australia in 1987, where he was a newspaper columnist until his death in 2011.

== Filmography ==
=== Film ===
Year	Title	Role	Notes
1976	Dona Flor and Her Two Husbands	American girl in casino	Film debut Uncredited
1979	The Warriors	Policewoman	
1981	Four Friends	Woman in Taxi	
1986	Heartburn	Eve	
1986	Twisted	Cybelle	
1987	Radio Days	Ad Man	
1987	84 Charing Cross Road	Kay	
1987	The Secret of My Succe$s	Sheila	
1987	Leader of the Band	Miss Cooper	
1988	Big	Mrs. Baskin	
1988	Married to the Mob	Connie Russo	
1989	Slaves of New York	Samantha	
1989	Crimes and Misdemeanors	Party Guest	Uncredited
1990	Crazy People	Dr. Liz Baylor	
1991	Another You	Elaine/Mimi Kravitz	
1991	The Fisher King	Anne	
1993	Lost in Yonkers	Bella Kurnitz	
1993	Last Action Hero	Irene Madigan	
1994	On Hope	Wendy	Short film
1997	Roseanna's Grave	Roseanna 'Rosa'	
1999	The Minus Man	Jane	
1999	Out of the Cold	Tina	
2000	What's Cooking?	Elizabeth 'Lizzy' Avila	
2000	More Dogs Than Bones	Victoria 'Vic' Galletti	
2000	The Amati Girls	Grace	
2002	Spooky House	Boss	
2004	Zeyda and the Hitman	Esther	
2010	Goldstar, Ohio	Adriana Rock	Short film
2014	Chu and Blossom	Mrs. Fefterg	
2016	Good Business	Lorraine	Short film
2019	Hustlers	Mother	
2023	The Nana Project	Helen “Nana” Lewis	

=== Television ===
Year	Title	Role	Notes
1977	The Doctors	Ursula	Television debut, recurring role
1984	ABC Afterschool Special	Sandy	Episode: "Mom's on Strike"
1985	Our Family Honor	Louise Taylor	Episode: "Homecoming"
1986	Kate & Allie	Millie	Episode: "Late Bloomer" as Mercedes Ruehle
1990	The Cosby Show	Bernadette Foley	Episode: "The Moves"
1995	Indictment: The McMartin Trial	Lael Rubin	Television movie
1995–96	Frasier	Kate Costas	Recurring role; 5 episodes
1997	North Shore Fish	Florence	Television movie
1997	SUBWAYStories: Tales from the Underground	Leyla	Television movie; Segment: "Underground"
1998	Gia	Kathleen Carangi	Television movie
2000	All-American Girl: The Mary Kay Letourneau Story	Jane Newhall	Television movie
2000	The Lost Child	Rebecca	Television movie
2001	Mr. Life		Television movie
2002	Guilt by Association	Susan Walker	Television movie
2002	Widows	Dolly Rawlins	4 episodes
2004	Everyday Life		Television movie
2004	1-800-Missing	Emmanuelle Baker	Episode: "These Dreams Before Me"
2004	Bad Apple	Lorraine Gibbons	Television movie
2004, 09	Law & Order	Judge Clara Lloyd/Zina Rybakov	2 episodes
2005	Mom at Sixteen	Terry Jeffries	Television movie
2006	So Here's What Happened	Rochelle	Television movie
2006	A Girl Like Me: The Gwen Araujo Story	Sylvia Guerrero	Television movie
2006–08	Entourage	Rita Chase	2 episodes
2007	Psych	Detective Goochberg	Episode: "Scary Sherry: Bianca's Toast"
2009	Loving Leah	Janice Lever	Television movie
2012	El Jefe	Delmi Rodriguez	Television movie
2012	Luck	Renzo's Mother	Episode: "Episode Nine"
2013	Doubt	Mrs. Syd Newman	Television movie
2013	Monday Mornings	Judge Beverly Natheson	Episode: "Wheels Within Wheels"
2013	Star Spangled Banners	Rosalind Banner	Television movie
2015	Law & Order: Special Victims Unit	Lucia Barba	Episode: "December Solstice"
2016	Life in Pieces	Mia	Episode: "Hair Recital Rainbow Mom"
2016	The Mysteries of Laura	Val Santiani	Episode: "The Mystery of the End of Watch"
2016	2 Broke Girls	Olga	Episode: "And the Godmama Drama"
2017	NCIS	Marie Quinn	Episode: "A Bowl of Cherries"
2017–18	Power	Connie Teresi	Recurring role; 7 episodes
2018–20	Bull	Judge Tessa Hudson	3 episodes
2022	New Amsterdam	Grace	Episode: "TBD"
2024	Accused	Connie	Episode: "Margot's Story"

=== Theater ===
Year	Title	Role	Venue
1985	Coming of Age in Soho	Patricia	The Public Theater
1985	The Marriage of Bette and Boo	Joan Brennan	The Public Theater
1985–88	I'm Not Rappaport	Clara	Booth Theatre, Broadway
1988	American Notes	Karen	The Public Theater
1989	Other People's Money	Kate Sullivan	Minetta Lane Theatre, Off-Broadway
1991	Lost in Yonkers	Bella Kurnitz	Richard Rodgers Theatre
1992	Antony and Cleopatra	Cleopatra	Actors Theater, Louisville
1994–95	The Shadow Box	Beverly	Circle in the Square Theatre, Broadway
1995	The Rose Tattoo	Serafina Delle Rose	Circle in the Square Theatre, Broadway
2000	The Vagina Monologues	Monologist	Westside Theatre, Off-Broadway
2000–01	Who's Afraid of Virginia Woolf?	Martha	Guthrie Theater. Minneapolis
2002	The Goat, or Who Is Sylvia?	Stevie	John Golden Theatre, Broadway
2005	Woman Before a Glass	Peggy Guggenheim	Promenade Theater, Off-Broadway
2009	The American Plan	Eva Adler	Samuel J. Friedman Theatre, Broadway
2010	Edward Albee's Occupant	Louise Nevelson	Peter Norton Space
2010	The Prisoner of Second Avenue	Edna Edison	The Old Vic Theatre Company, Vaudeville Theatre, London
2012	The How and the Why	Zelda Kahn	McCarter Theatre, New Jersey
2015	Full Gallop	Diana Vreeland	Old Globe Theatre, California
2017	Torch Song	Ma Beckoff	Second Stage Theater, Off-Broadway
2019	Torch Song	Ma Beckoff	Helen Hayes Theatre, Broadway

== Awards and nominations ==
Year	Award	Category	Project	Results
1989	National Society of Film Critics	Best Supporting Actress	Married to the Mob	Won
1991	Drama Desk Award	Outstanding Actress in a Play	Lost in Yonkers	Won
1991	Tony Award	Best Actress in a Play	Lost in Yonkers	Won
1991	Academy Award	Best Supporting Actress	The Fisher King	Won
1991	American Comedy Award	Funniest Supporting Actress in a Motion Picture	The Fisher King	Won
1991	Boston Society of Film Critics	Best Supporting Actress	The Fisher King	Won
1991	Chicago Film Critics Association	Best Supporting Actress	The Fisher King	Won
1991	Dallas-Fort Worth Film Critics Association	Best Supporting Actress	The Fisher King	Won
1991	Golden Globe Award	Best Supporting Actress in a Motion Picture	The Fisher King	Won
1991	Los Angeles Film Critics Association	Best Actress	The Fisher King	Won
1991	Saturn Award	Best Supporting Actress	The Fisher King	Won
1993	Boston Film Festival	Film Excellence Award	—N/a	Won
1995	CableACE Award	Best Actress in a Movie or Miniseries	Indictment: The McMartin Trial	Nominated
1995	Drama Desk Award	Outstanding Actress in a Play	The Rose Tattoo	Nominated
1995	Tony Award	Best Featured Actress in a Play	The Shadow Box	Nominated
2002	Tony Award	Best Actress in a Play	The Goat, or Who Is Sylvia?	Nominated
2006	Prism Award	Best Performance in a Television Movie or Miniseries	Mom at Sixteen	Nominated
2007	Imagen Foundation Award	Best Actress - Television	A Girl Like Me: The Gwen Araujo Story	Nominated
