= Arts Engine =

Arts Engine is a film organization whose activities include documentary film production, film festival, and a website for filmmakers, activists, educators and students to share information.

== History ==
Arts Engine was founded by Katy Chevigny and Julia Pimsleur in 1997 to focus on social issue documentaries. Their projects include 11 feature-length documentaries. The best-known of these is the Emmy-nominated film Deadline. They subsequently made the Youth Media Dissemination Initiative (YMDi.org). They also developed the Media That Matters Film Festival, an early online film festival.

== Big Mouth Films ==
Big Mouth Films is a production company that works on feature-length, social issue documentaries.

- (A)sexual (2011) follows the growth of a community that experiences no sexual attraction. It uses interviews, variety of footage, and animation to document David Jay and four other characters. (A)sexual premiered at the Frameline Film Festival on June 18, 2011.
- Pushing the Elephant (2010) follows Rose Mapendo, her work as an activist, and her relationship with her daughter Nangabire, who had remained in the Democratic Republic of the Congo when Rose fled in the late 1990s. It was directed by Beth Davenport and Elizabeth Mandel. It was screened on PBS's series Independent Lens in early 2011.
- Election Day (2007) follows American voters nationwide on November 2, 2004 to document the democratic process. Election Day premiered at South by Southwest Film Festival (SXSW) in 2007.
- Arctic Son (2006): In the Arctic village of Old Crow, a father and son who come from different backgrounds are reunited after 20 years apart. Arctic Son was released on POV on August 21, 2007.
- Deadline (2004) follows Illinois Governor George Ryan as he questions the guilt of thirteen people slated for execution. Deadline won the Thurgood Marshall Journalism Award and was nominated for an Emmy.
- Journey to the West (2001) looks at the origins of traditional Chinese medicine, how it is used in modern-day China, and how it has been adapted in the United States. The film includes footage of traditional medical practices in the People's Republic of China and interviews of Chinese medical practitioners in the United States.
- Outside Looking In (2001): This film documents three families with trans-racially adopted children of different races, across generations. It includes the transition from natural parents to adoptive parents, and challenges of racial identity for children of one race who are raised in another.
- Brother Born Again (2000): Julia Pimsleur, a bisexual, Jewish New Yorker, travels to Alaska to reconnect with her brother, a born again Christian. He has lived with his family there for ten years since dropping out of college and converting.
- Nuyorican Dream (2000) is the story of a New York Puerto Rican family contending with urban poverty. Clips from the movie were used in a radio story for This American Life covering the same topic.
- Innocent Until Proven Guilty (1999): James Forman, Jr. is a public defender and the son of civil rights activist James Forman. The film follows Forman's work at the Public Defender Service and at an alternative high school for juvenile ex-offenders.

== Media That Matters Film Festival ==
The Media That Matters Film Festival is an interactive, yearlong series of short films on social issues such as immigration, global warming, fair trade, gay rights, and sustainable agriculture. Past awards ceremonies have included presentations by celebrities. Past festivals have also included a live tour, distribution through Netflix, and independent screenings.

== MediaRights.org ==
MediaRights.org is a website focused on issue-oriented media. At one point it had 26,000 registered members and hosted more than 7,400 films in its online database.
