= The American Plan =

The American Plan is a play by Richard Greenberg, which ran both Off-Broadway in 1990 and on Broadway in 2009.

== Productions ==
The play premiered Off-Broadway, produced by the Manhattan Theatre Club at New York City Center Stage II on January 23, 1990, and closed on February 18, 1990 after 32 performances. Directed by Evan Yionoulis the cast featured Rebecca Miller (Lili), Tate Donovan (Nick), Beatrice Winde (Olivia), Joan Copeland (Eva) and Eric Stoltz (Gil). The play transferred to the Manhattan Theatre Club Mainstage on December 4, 1990 and closed on January 18, 1991 after 52 performances. The cast featured Wendy Makkena (Lili), D. W. Moffett (Nick), Joan Copeland (Eva), Yvette Hawkins (Olivia), and Jonathan Walker (Gil).

The Manhattan Theatre Club presented the play on Broadway at the Samuel J. Friedman Theatre from January 2, 2009 in previews, opening January 22, and closing March 22, 2009. Directed by David Grindley, the cast featured Mercedes Ruehl and Lily Rabe.

The Theatre Royal Bath presented the play from March 7 to April 6, 2013, starring Luke Allen-Gale as Nick, Diana Quick as Eva and Emily Taaffe as Lili.

== Plot ==
In 1960 Eva Adler, who is a widow, has a vacation home in the Catskill Mountains, in New York, across a lake from a resort. Her daughter, Lili Adler, is a socially awkward 20-year old who feels trapped by her mother's constant attention. Lili meets Nick Lockridge, an aspiring architect who is engaged to a woman from a wealthy family. Lili and Nick develop a romantic relationship over the course of the summer. Eva, Lili's controlling mother, is against any relationship and works to discredit Nick.

== Critical response ==
Michael Billington, in his review of the 2013 Theatre Royal Bath production for The Guardian, wrote: "But what makes the play so compelling is Greenberg's ambivalent view of his characters. We are never sure whether Lili's affable suitor, Nick, is quite what he seems, any more than we know whether Eva might be genuinely seeking to protect her fantasising daughter from a hostile world."

The New Yorker Magazine reviewer of the 2009 production wrote: "From this somewhat incredible beginning, with its glib exposition that smacks of romantic comedy, Greenberg reverses our narrative expectations and spins a psychologically astute, compelling study of narcissistic delusion—his version of 'The Heiress,' in which the payoff is not revenge but revelation about the stranglehold of symbiosis....The play, however, is about greed of an altogether different kind: financial, psychic, and sexual."

== Awards and nominations ==
Joan Copeland won the 1990-1991 OBIE Award, Performance.
