= David Geiser =

American painter (1947–2020)

David Geiser (June 28, 1947 – October 14, 2020) was an American painter and creator of several underground comix.

== Life and works ==
David Geiser was an abstract expressionist painter, born in Rochester, New York in 1947. He studied at the University of Vermont and the Art Students League. In 1969, he postponed attending Yale University, moving instead to San Francisco and began drawing underground comix, while befriending other underground comic creators such as S. Clay Wilson and San Francisco Comic Book Company founder Grey Arlington and immersed himself in illustrations. Geiser created several underground comic titles in the early 1970s, including Saloon, Demented Pervert, Clowns, Uncle Sham, DTs, Pain, Sloppy Seconds, and Edge City. The number of issues produced ranged from 1,000 to about 10,000.

Geiser left San Francisco in 1976 and spent two years in Paris, where he studied at the Ecole des Beaux-Arts. He returned to the United States in 1979, settling in SoHo, New York in the early 1980s. At that point, Geiser began concentrating on oil painting and moving into abstract expressionism. His canvases are tactile and deep, often being composed of many layers of shellac, pitch, tar, rope and scrap wood.

Geiser was married to actress Mercedes Ruehl. In 2001 they moved to East Hampton where they lived with their son, Jake. A son from a previous marriage, Cameron Geiser, lives in Montara, California. They put their Hampton house on the market in 2017; the same year Ruehl was quoted as saying that they were no longer together, but remained close.

David Geiser died unexpectedly of heart disease in his sleep at home on October 14, 2020, at the age of 73.
