= Rose Mapendo =

Congolese activist

- Born: 1963 (age 62–63); Mulenge, Democratic Republic of Congo
- Occupation: Activist

Rose Mapendo (born 1963) is a Congolese human rights activist. She founded the Rose Mapendo Foundation with the mission to empower the women of the Democratic Republic of Congo, Rwanda, and Burundi to rise above their circumstances and unite to bring peace to their region.

== Biography ==
=== Early life ===
Rose Mapendo was born in Mulenge, Democratic Republic of Congo (DRC), in 1963. She grew up in a humble Tutsi Christian family. She belongs to the Banyamulenge Tutsi tribe. Raised for marriage and motherhood according to her family's culture, Mapendo never went to school. She married when she was 16, as is common among women of the tribe. In 1994, she moved to the city of Mbuji-Mayi so that her children could go to school and her husband began his career as a butcher.

=== Genocide in the Democratic Republic of Congo ===
On August 2, 1998, the government of the DRC ordered the genocide of the Tutsi people in the Congo. During this time, the police visited Mapendo on multiple occasions to question her about the location of her husband and their money. She lied, saying that her husband was not home, and had gone to buy cows for his business. In reality, he was at home and in hiding assuming the men were being taken into custody, but they would never take the women and children. She was wrong. They later heard on televised news that the president was willing to kill all Tutsis and keep their belongings and money, but, with nowhere to go, the family hid at home cloaked in darkness with no activity to give the home the appearance that it was abandoned. Rose paid friends and neighbors to make any purchases that she needed. Eventually, however, her family was found. They were carried in a truck to a prison camp on the night of September 23, 1998, along with four other Tutsi families.

=== Experiences in the camp ===
They were in the camp for sixteen months. Under the surveillance of guards, the government ordered the murder of all the men there, including Mapendo's husband. Women and children were starved, and two women and two children in her camp were murdered by the government. In the camp they had no food or health system, and everyone had lice. Children had to defecate in the cell because there was no sanitation. To save her son from being killed by a soldier she had to give a soldier her 17-year-old daughter as a sex partner. At this time, she was pregnant and sick. While at the camp, Rose gave birth to twins on the floor with other prisoners, including seven of her children, present. With no medical attention, Rose tied the umbilical cords using the thread binding her hair and cut them with a piece of wood. In an effort to save the babies' lives, she named them after two of the camp's commanders. This strategy seemed to work, as the wife of a commander visited one day to bring a piece of clothing and some bread. When the orders came for the prisoners to be killed. the commander had them transferred to another prison situated in Kinshasa (capital of the DRC), as he could not be responsible for the death of his namesake. While there, the soldier who had taken her daughter visited the camp along with the son of the president (future president Joseph Kabila), who left money and gave the order not to hurt the prisoners. Within two weeks, the group was dropped off at a human rights center and then transferred to an American aid center. After ten days, they were transferred to a Red Cross-run protection center in Cameroon by the US government's emergency program to resettle Tutsi refugees from the Congo.

Meanwhile, Nangabire, her 11-year-old daughter, was with Mapendo's father and mother-in-law in the Congo when the surrounding village was attacked. They fled to Rwanda and stayed with a family member for approximately three years before Rose sent Nangabire to stay with her parents in Kenya.

In July 2000, Mapendo and her children received refugee status and moved to the United States. During this time, Rose did not know if Nangabire had survived. After a long search, Rose received word that her parents and daughter were alive. In 2007, Nangabire received refugee status and was reunited with her family in the US.

=== Life in the United States and humanitarian projects ===
While in the United States, Mapendo saved money to send to the widows of refugees. She also organized a number of demonstrations to raise public awareness about the problems faced by refugees, and to raise money for those who lived in refugee camps or who were otherwise displaced.

Mapendo starred in the 2010 documentary Pushing the Elephant, which tells the story of the separation between her and Nangabire during the Congolese genocide and their reunion in Arizona. The film tries to convey to people the importance of the fight against violence and for human rights. She has also influenced others to follow suit.

== Personal life ==
As of 2009, Mapendo lived in Phoenix, Arizona, and had ten children. They study at the local schools and universities, worship at the local church and work in various fields. The twins born while in the death camp graduated from high school in the spring of 2017. She is now a grandmother of six.

== Awards ==
- 2007 - Volvo for Life Award
- 2008 - CNN Hero
- 2009 - Winner of the United Nations Humanitarian of the Year Award
- 2015 - Muhammad Ali Humanitarian of the Year Award for Gender Equality

== See also ==
- Congolese Americans
