= Caribbean and West Indian Australians =

Total population
- 4,242 (by ancestry, 2006); 10,500 (by birth, 2023).

Regions with significant populations
- New South Wales · Victoria

Languages
- Caribbean English, Caribbean Spanish, Haitian Creole, Antillean Creole, Papiamento, French

Related ethnic groups
- Cuban Australians, British Indo-Caribbean people, British African-Caribbean people, Caribbean Brazilians, African Australians, West Indian Americans, Black Canadians

Caribbean and West Indian Australians are people of Caribbean ancestry who are citizens of Australia.

== Demographics ==
According to the 2006 Australian census, 4,852 Australians were born in the Caribbean while 4,242 claimed the Caribbean ancestry, either alone or with another ancestry.

== History ==
Connections between the West Indies and Australia began in the early days of European settlement.

Australia’s first newspaper publisher, and founder of the Sydney Gazette in 1803 was George Howe, a white convict from St Kitts. Eighteen convicts from the West Indies arrived on the convict ship the Moffatt in 1836 including William Buchanan and Richard Holt. Buchanan and James Smith, also from Jamaica, were two of 34 convicts from the West Indies known to have stayed at the Hyde Park Barracks. Billy Blue who had served in the British Army before being convicted of stealing sugar and transported to Australia was also thought to be a Jamaican.

At the height of the British Empire, officers and administrators moved freely between far-flung colonies. Many came to Australia from the West Indies, while others, like Edward Eyre, left Australia to take up appointments there. Another emigrant was barrister Robert Burnside. He was born and raised in the Bahamas, the son of the country's Solicitor-General. After qualifying in England, he set up practice in Perth, eventually becoming a Supreme Court judge.

Black convicts, servants and sailors from the West Indies also arrived in Australia and many of them later integrated into Aboriginal communities. These relationships, and links forged through the sport of boxing, contributed to later alliances between the Black Consciousness Movements in Australia, the USA and the West Indies, including a branch of Marcus Garvey’s UNIA-ACL in Sydney in the 1920s.

Caribbean people were also among the many nationalities flocking to the Victorian goldfields after 1851. One of the thirteen miners killed at the Eureka Stockade was a Jamaican, James Campbell. Arthur Windsor, editor of the Age newspaper from 1872 to 1900 was born in Barbados.

Especially since the abandonment of the White Australia policy, West Indians have arrived from many countries of the Commonwealth, including honky-tonk pianist Winifred Atwell to environmental engineer Ken Potter and writer Ralph de Boissière.

=== Further reading ===
- Smith, Dr. Karina, Pat Thomas, and Lisa Montague, eds. Adding Pimento: Caribbean Migration to Victoria, Australia. Melbourne: Breakdown Press, 2014.
- Pybus, Cassandra. Black Founders: The Unknown Story of Australia's First Black Settlers. Sydney: NewSouth Publishing, 2006.
- Chingaipe, Santilla. Black Convicts: How Slavery Shaped Australia. Sydney: Scribner Australia, 2024.

=== Further Listening ===
- ABC Radio National. “Caribbean Convicts in Australia.” *The History Listen*, 30 November 2021.

== See also ==
- African Australians
- American Australians
- Arab Australians
- Asian Australians
- Black Australians
- European Australians
- Indigenous Australians
- North African and Middle Eastern Australians
