= Ethiopian Australians =

Ethiopians who resides in Australia

ኢትዮጵያውያን አውስትራሊያውያን

Total population
- 18,600 (by ancestry, 2019); 14,092 (by birth, 2021).

Regions with significant populations
- Melbourne, Sydney

Languages
- Various languages of Ethiopia, Australian English

Religion
- Ethiopian Orthodox Tewahedo Church, Islam, Pentecostalism

Related ethnic groups
- Eritrean Australians, Djiboutian Australians, Somali Australians, Kenyan Australians, South Sudanese Australians, Sudanese Australians

Ethiopian Australians (Amharic: ኢትዮጵያውያን አውስትራሊያውያን, romanized: ītiyop'iyawiyani āwisitiralīyawiyani) are immigrants from Ethiopia to Australia and their descendants. However, as Ethiopia is a multi-ethnic country with significant inter-ethnic tensions, not all individuals from Ethiopia accept the label "Ethiopian", instead preferring to identify by their ethnic group. In particular, various Oromo people use the term 'Oromo Australian' instead. In contrast, there are many individuals who prefer to label themselves as Ethiopian Australians. This is because they oppose labelling themselves based on their ethnicity as they see it as divisive and politicising their ethnic identity. This is common among the Amharic-speaking community along with ethnically mixed individuals, compared to others who stand by their ethnic identity.

== Migration history ==
Ethiopian refugees who would later settle in Australia began fleeing their home country as early as the 1970s, following the rise to power of the Derg regime. They lived in refugee camps in neighbouring countries, mainly Sudan and Kenya, some for as long as 20 years before they found a country willing to resettle them. More left as refugees after Eritrea gained independence in 1993. The United States, rather than Australia, was the first-choice destination for most refugees; as a result, the Ethiopians in Australia tend to have less educational background and occupational skills than Ethiopian populations who relocated elsewhere.

Late in the following year, 350 more Ethiopians from the Abu Rakham camp in Sudan, largely single or widowed mothers and their families, were resettled in Australia. These were mostly Christians of Amhara and Tigray descent.

== Numbers and distribution ==
According to the 2006 Australian census 5,633 Australians were born in Ethiopia while 5,600 claimed Ethiopian ancestry, either alone or with another ancestry. The similar figures for ancestry and place of birth are indicative of the very recent immigration of this group.

Australia's 2001 census found about 3,600 residents of the country who reported their place of birth as Ethiopia. This made them the 15th-largest group of Ethiopian-born people in a country outside of Ethiopia, ahead of the United Arab Emirates and behind Norway. About 85% of those lived in Melbourne, alongside communities of immigrants from other countries in the Horn of Africa, mainly Eritrea and Somalia; they are primarily settled in Footscray and neighbouring suburbs such as Ascot Vale, Braybrook, Flemington, Kensington, and Sunshine. Other communities of Ethiopians can be found in New South Wales and Tasmania.

== Education and employment ==
According to the 2011 Census, 51.3 per cent of Ethiopia-born Australians 15 years and over in age had some form of higher non-school qualifications. 19.7 per cent of the Ethiopia-born aged 15 years and over were still attending an educational institution.

Ethiopia-born individuals in Australia aged 15 years and over participated in the labour force at a rate of 62.3 per cent; the unemployment rate was 15 per cent. Of the 3,775 Ethiopia-born immigrants who were employed, 26.2 per cent worked in a professional, skilled managerial or trade occupation. In Footscray, some have set up ethnic-oriented businesses, such as hair salons, clothing shops, and restaurants with a mostly Ethiopian customer base.

== Religion ==
According to Australian Bureau of Statistics in 2016, the most common responses to the religion question among Ethiopian Australian (11.795 in 2016) were Oriental Orthodox (25.6%), Islam (24.4%), Nondenominational Christian (12.7%), Eastern Orthodox (9.8%) and Other Protestant (4.1%).

In 2021, the most common responses to the religion question among Ethiopian Australian were Islam (27.5%), Oriental Orthodox (25.8%), Nondenominational Christian (13.9%), Eastern Orthodox (7.9%) and No religion (4.5%).

Religious divisions among migrants from Ethiopia follow ethnic lines. The Amhara and Tigray are largely members of the Ethiopian Orthodox Tewahedo Church while the Gurage are almost evenly divided between members of the Ethiopian Orthodox Tewahedo Church and followers of Islam. Most Oromo are Muslim or members of the Ethiopian Orthodox Tewahedo Church or various Pentecostal churches, and the Harari and Afar are almost all Muslims. There were two Ethiopian Pentecostal churches in the Melbourne area as of 2001, as well as an Ethiopian Orthodox church in Maribyrnong. However, there were no mosques specifically devoted to Muslims from Ethiopia; instead, they worship alongside believers from other countries.

== Notable people ==
- Kamal Ibrahim, footballer
- Mizan Mehari, long-distance runner
- Abebe Fekadu, powerlifter
- Bendere Oboya, sprinter
- Sunday Aryang, netballer
- Tsehay Hawkins, entertainer
