= Australia–Kenya relations =

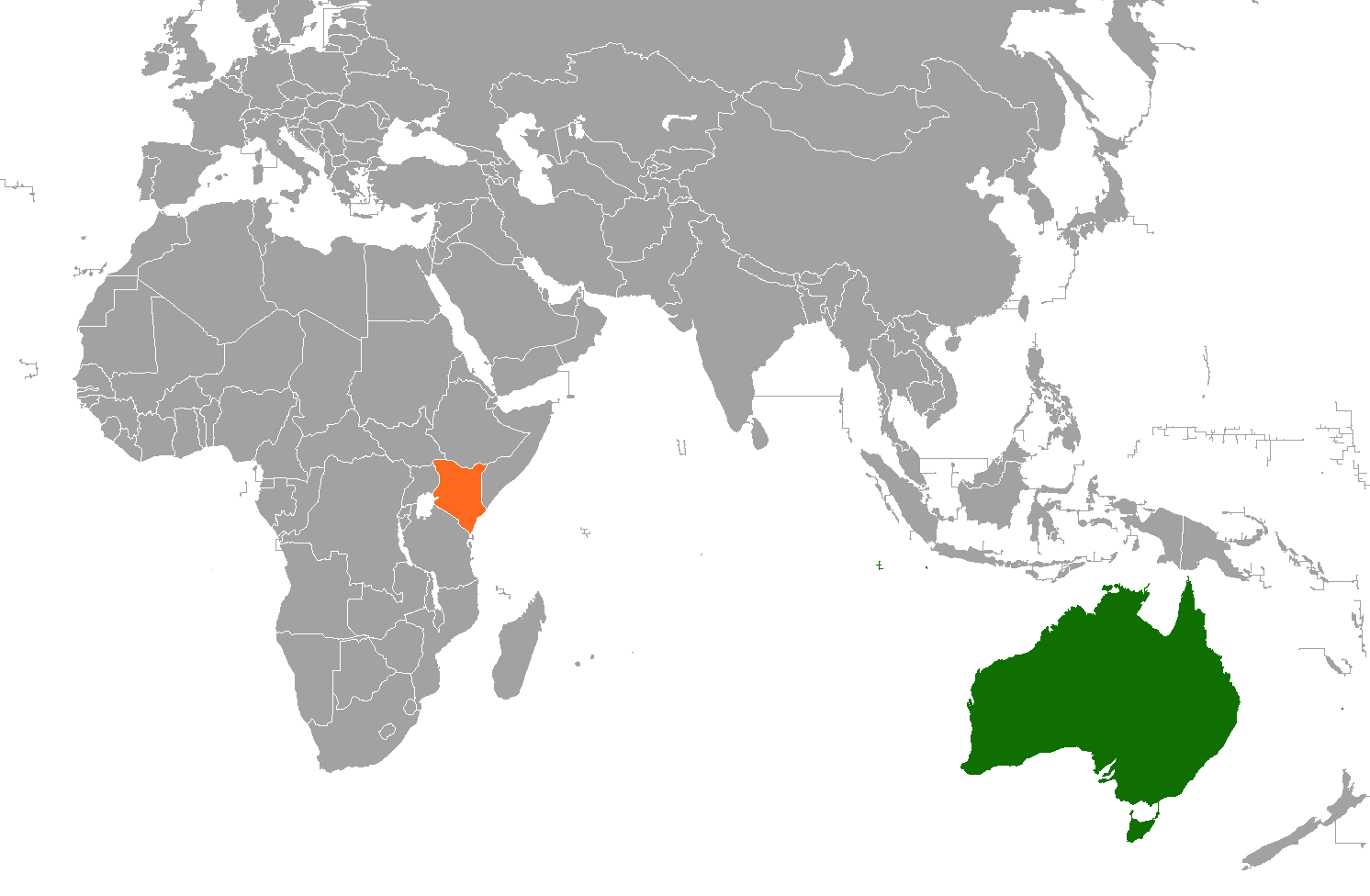

- Australia: Kenya

Diplomatic mission
- High Commission of Australia, Nairobi: Kenya High Commission, Canberra

Envoy
- High Commissioner: High Commissioner

Bilateral relations exist between Australia and Kenya. Both Australia and Kenya were formerly part of the British Empire, although not simultaneously, and are current member states of the Commonwealth of Nations. As of 2020, both Commonwealth nations have maintained bilateral relations for 55 years.

Australia and Kenya have built strong relations through trade, agriculture, foreign aid, counter-terrorism, and education. Australia has a High Commission in Nairobi. Kenya has a High Commission in Canberra.

== History ==
Australia and Kenya share a common history as both nations were part of the British Empire. The British Empire gained control of the land which today is known as Kenya in 1895 and established it as the East Africa Protectorate, later known as the Kenya Colony. Australia achieved independence from Britain in 1901 but still maintained connections with Kenya since both are members of the Commonwealth.

=== Kenyan independence ===
During the Mau Mau Uprising from 1952 to 1960, a number of Australians assisted the British authorities in their suppression of the Mau Mau who were fighting for freedom and independence from the British Empire. In 1954, Australian journalist Donald Horne reported that RAAF renowned pilot Dick Hunt, Colonel Philip Morecambe and "Davo" Davidson were among those Australians actively fighting for the Kenya Regiment.

In 1963, Kenya became independent from the British Empire in a move that was supported by Britain and congratulated by Australia. The Australian Prime Minister at the time, Robert Menzies, addressed Kenyan Prime Minister, Jomo Kenyatta, stating:

On the occasion of the celebration of the independence of Kenya, I gladly take this opportunity to convey to you and to the people of Kenya my most sincere congratulations and those of the Australian government and people. Kenya's independence within the Commonwealth marks a further and important stage in the achievements of independence by the peoples of Africa and Australia looks forward to the development of close and friendly relations between the two countries.

=== Indigenous activism ===
In 1964, Tom Mboya, the Kenyan Minister for Justice at the time, visited Australia by invitation of Prime Minister Robert Menzies. Mboya met with Jack Horner and Stan Davey, the leaders of the Federal Council for the Advancement of Aborigines and was reportedly "displeased" that the leaders of this Indigenous Council were "two white men". Mboya extended an invitation to Phillip Roberts and Davis Daniels, Aboriginal leaders of the Northern Territory Council for Aboriginal Rights (NTCAR), to visit Kenya and "awaken in them ambitions for their own people to take a far greater part in running Australia." Roberts and Daniels visited Kenya in December 1964 and met with Kenyan Prime Minister Jomo Kenyatta who said of their visit:

I feel that such visits by these people, who are our brothers, to our country will be of value to these leaders who may not have seen a black man working for himself, or governing his country. I think this is one reason for inviting these people to our country - to open their eyes and give them some idea of how they can redeem themselves from the old colonial kind of regime.

Upon their return to Australia, Roberts was inspired to fight for equal rights and opportunities for Aboriginal people and the visit consolidated Kenya's political support for Indigenous rights and activism in Australia.

== Trade ==
Monthly value of Australian merchandise exports to Kenya (A$ millions) since 1988.

Monthly value of Kenyan merchandise exports to Australia (A$ millions) since 1988.

Bilateral trade between Australia and Kenya began in the early twentieth century following the British colonisation of Kenya. The Kenya colony were primarily producing sisal cotton, coffee, maize and soda for an international market and relied upon Australia for agricultural commodities. Australian companies such as Dalgety & Co. and W. C. Hunter & Co. were established in Kenya in the 1920s and traded merino sheep, cattle and agricultural supplies to the Kenyan settlers to help them establish farming practices. In 1965, following Kenya's independence, Australia held a trade fair in Kenya from January 27 to February 2 with all proceeds going to Kenya's National Fund. This event was a great show of Australia's support for the newly independent Commonwealth nation and helped to further develop bilateral trade between the two nations.

In September 2015, the month that marked 50 years of bilateral relations between Australia and Kenya, a Memorandum of Understanding was signed between the Kenya-Australia Chamber of Commerce and the Kenya National Chamber of Commerce and Industry to strengthen ties between the two Chambers and the commercial relationship between Australia and Kenya. The Kenya Australia Chamber of Commerce host an annual Australia-Kenya Business and Exhibition Conference in Australia which is supported by both the Kenyan and Australian High Commissions.

Other organisations such as KenInvest and Austrade also promote commercial relations between Australia and Kenya through encouraging investment and business. Austrade has an office in Nairobi which facilitates Australian companies to expand into Kenya and access the East African market. Australia and Kenya are both members of the Indian-Ocean Rim Association for Regional Cooperation (IOR-ARC), founded by Australia in 1997, which has facilitated trade and cooperation between nations bordering the Indian Ocean.

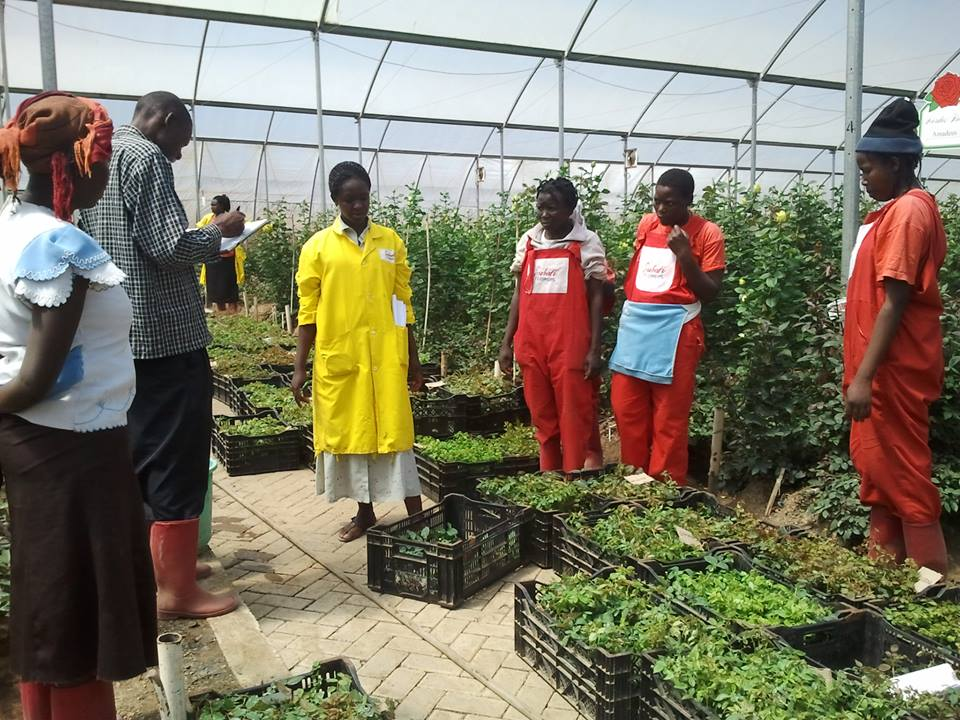
Kenyan rose workers plan for rose sapling planting in a Greenhouse, 2017.

In 2018–19, Australia's trade with Kenya was valued at AU$115 million. Australia's main exports to Kenya have shifted from predominately vegetables in the late twentieth century to wheat, aluminium, zinc and intermediate goods through the twenty-first century. Kenya's main exports to Australia since the late twentieth century include vegetables, animals, consumer goods and raw materials.

In 2017, the Kenyan rose industry broke through to the Australian market on a large scale with 5.22 million rose stems being imported in the lead up to Valentine's Day. This number increased to 6.46 million imported rose stems from Kenya in 2018 which accounted for over 60% of Australia's imported rose stems in the lead up to Valentine's Day. Kenyan flower exports began competing with Australian growers until 2018 when Australia introduced new bio-security measures to reduce the number of pests in imported flowers which Kenya are yet to comply with. Australia extended the deadline for countries to comply with these new measures three times and the Australian Department of Agriculture announced in 2019 that there would be no further extension. The Australian market is an important diversifier for the Kenyan flower industry as Clement Tulezi, Kenyan Flower Council chief executive said in 2019, "Australia is a growing market with huge potential and we cannot afford to lose it if we are to succeed in diversification."

== Mining ==
Base Resources is an Australian-owned multinational resources company with headquarters in Perth, Australia and a mineral sands mine in Kwale, Kenya. The Kwale Operations mine is a US$310 million investment that was established in late 2013 and processes ore to produce ilmenite, rutile and zircon. According to a 2018 report from the Australian Government, the Kwale mine:

is significantly boosting revenue for the Government of Kenya and Kwale County and is set to deliver significant revenues in tax and royalty payments over the life of the mine, together with considerable indirect taxation, direct and indirect employment and other economic benefits.

Africa Down Under hold an annual conference in Perth, Australia to educate investors on Australia's mining and energy interests in Africa and has become the biggest African-focused mining event hosted outside of Africa.

From 2017 to 2019, ActionAid were supported by the Australian Government to undertake a project working to support women in mining-affected communities in Kenya and other southern African nations. The project worked with Kenyan government officials and mining companies to protect the rights of women in the mining industry.

== Education ==
Australia has increasingly become a popular study destination for Kenyan students due to the attractiveness of their student visas and the accessibility of Australian tertiary education for foreign students. In 2019, there were 3,426 Kenyan students enrolled at Australian universities. This was almost a 60% increase from the 2014 enrolments five years prior. Australia's student visa arrangement allows Kenyan students to work part-time while they study, and stay on in Australia after their degree to work for some time. There are over 700 scholarships, fellowships and grants offered to Kenyan students at Australian universities.

Since 1988, the Australian Government have sponsored Kenyan nationals to study master's degrees or short courses at Australian institutions through the Australian Awards scholarship program. Through the Australia Awards, Kenyan applicants have the opportunity to receive an education at an Australian institution in areas such as mining, agriculture, health, public policy, infrastructure or education and return to Kenya with this knowledge to benefit their local community.

== Australian foreign aid in Kenya ==
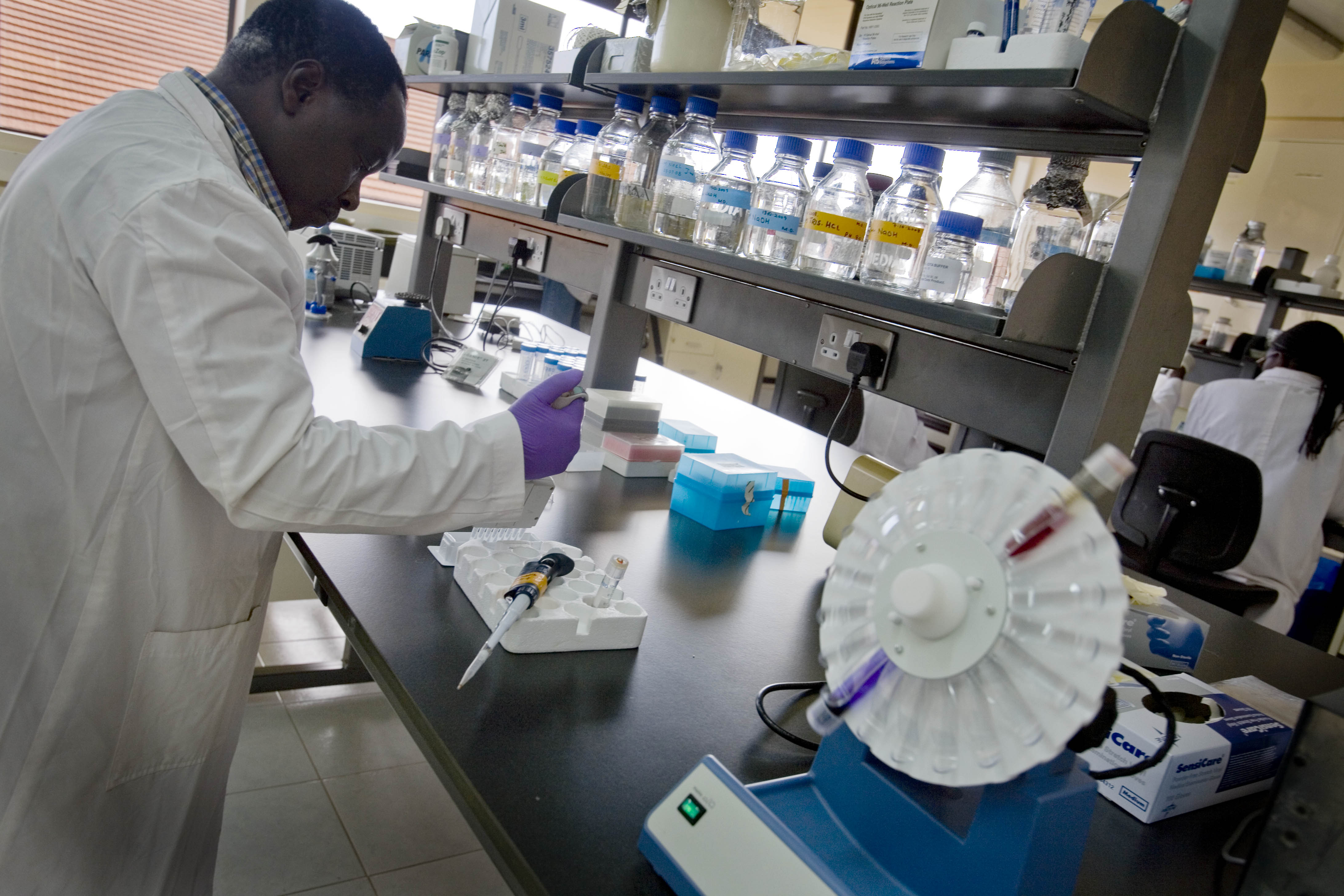
Scientists work in a laboratory at the International Livestock Research Institute in Nairobi, Kenya. Australia provides funding to the Institute through the Australian Centre for International Agricultural Research (ACIAR) to improve African food security.

Australia has provided formal development assistance to Kenya since the late twentieth century. In 1983, the Australian Government committed over AU$300,000 to funding the United Nations Food and Agriculture Organisation's re-forestation project in the Baringo district in north-western Kenya. This project was focused on transforming an area of "wasteland" into "agriculturally productive land", as reported by the Canberra Times in 1987.

Australia has been committed to improving food security in Kenya and developing their agricultural productivity through organisations such as the Australian Centre for International Agricultural Research (ACIAR) and the Australian International Food Security Centre (AIFSC), which established an office in Nairobi in 2012. These centres have funded research and programs in Kenya to help them adopt agricultural technology and improve their farming productivity. Their priorities in Kenya include: "Intensification and increased resilience in maize-legume-livestock-based mixed farming systems, to improve dietary energy and nutritional quality, and increase household income."

Australia has assisted Kenya to meet the international climate change obligations and progress towards the Kenya Vision 2030 which aims to improve Kenya's economy, industry, environment and quality of life. The System for Land Based Emissions Estimation in Kenya (SLEEK) is a AU$13 million Australian measurement, reporting and verification (MRV) system that aims to help the Government of Kenya build a national carbon accounting system that they can use to educate their economic and environmental decisions and policies.

Australian programs such as the Australian Government's Direct Aid Program (DIP) and the Australian NGO Cooperative Program (ANCP), as well as other Australian charities and organisations, have been committed to providing financial assistance, education and humanitarian support to Kenyan communities.

== Counter-terrorism ==
Australia and Kenya actively collaborate on counter-terrorism and piracy. In September 2013, an Australian was among the 67 people killed at the Westgate Mall terrorist attack in Nairobi, Kenya. In January 2019, an Australian was caught up in a terrorist attack in a hotel and office complex in Nairobi. Both these attacks were carried out by Somali militant Islamist groups. The response from Australia and Kenya reflected their strategic national interests to counter terrorism and violent extremism globally. It is also in Australia's commercial and national interest to protect their mining industry, companies and Australian nationals operating in Kenya from the threat of terrorist attacks. Australia's 2015 national security report on their counter terrorism strategy states that:

When an international terrorist incident affects Australian citizens or interests, the Commonwealth Government is responsible for coordinating Australia's response. Consular assistance will be provided to victims and their families. If asked by the government of an affected country, Australian governments may also assist in responding to an overseas terrorist attack, such as providing medical, police, intelligence or forensic assistance.

The Australian Navy and Military have partnered with Kenya to assist with patrols of the Indian Ocean and military training. In April 2014, the Australian Navy intercepted a drug haul off the coast of Kenya and seized one tonne of heroin valued at AU$290 million. Drug smuggling in the Indian Ocean often profit terrorists organisations and Australia and Kenya are committed to the international operation of intercepting smuggling boats as part of their national policies against terrorism.

== Cultural ==
Australia and Kenya share a national language of English, established through their colonial history. Christianity is the dominant religion of both nations, accounting for over 80% of the population of Kenya in 2009, and 86% of religious Australians in 2018. The 2016 Australian Bureau of Statistics (ABS) census recorded 17,652 Kenyans living in Australia and there is a strong community of Australians living and working in Kenya.

Australia and Kenya both share a national interest in sports such as cricket, football, rugby union, and rugby sevens. Efforts have been made to introduce Australian rules football (AFL) to Kenya in an attempt to expand the game internationally.

== Diplomatic missions ==
The Australian High Commission in Kenya was formed in September 1965 in Kenya's capital city, Nairobi. Ambassador Alison Chartres has been the head of the mission since 2017 and represents Australia as a senior officer of the Australian Department of Foreign Affairs and Trade (DFAT). Australia's close relations with Kenya allows them to extend their ties to other African nations and organisation as the Australian High Commission in Kenya is also associated with the nations of Burundi, Rwanda, Somalia, Tanzania and Uganda as well as the East African Community (EAC), United Nations Environment Programme (UNEP), United Nations Human Settlement Programme (UN-Habitat) and the International Conference of the Great Lakes Region (ICGLR).

In 1984, the Kenyan High Commission in Canberra was established to further consolidate Australia–Kenya relations. The head of the Kenyan mission in Australia is Ambassador Isaiya Kabira. This mission is also accredited to New Zealand, allowing Kenya to extend their relations to the greater Pacific Region.

In May 2012, Kenyan Foreign Minister Sam Ongeri held discussions with Australian High Commissioner to Kenya, Geoff Tooth. Australia and Kenya have exchanged a number of other significant political visits in recent years to consolidate their relations.

== See also ==
- Foreign relations of Australia
- Foreign relations of Kenya
- Kenyan Australians
