= Aku Kadogo =

American choreographer

Aku Kadogo, born Karen Vest, is a choreographer, director, actress, and educator. She was one of the original cast members of Ntozake Shange's For Colored Girls Who Have Considered Suicide / When the Rainbow Is Enuf (1976), and acted in the 1990s Australian children's television series Lift Off. She has educated and performed in Australia, Senegal, Cuba, Brazil, and Hong Kong, and South Korea.

== Early life and education ==
Born Karen Vest, Aku Kadogo grew up in Detroit, Michigan. Her parents, Don and Hilda Vest, were activists and performers. As a young girl, Kadogo's mother encouraged her participation in demonstrations against the Vietnam War, and both parents often took her to cultural events throughout the city.

She attended Cass Technical High School, specializing in their Performing Arts Department from 1969 to 1972. Unimpressed with her high school department, she enrolled in a program at the defunct Concept East Theatre during her last year of high school. It was there that she got her first acting role. Her first professional performance was of Sonia Sanchez's "Sister Sonji".

Kadogo attended New York University (NYU) from 1972 to 1976 upon graduating from high school.

The name "Aku," meaning "Wednesday born" originates from Ghana's Ewe language. Her last name, "Kadogo" is derived from Swahili. It means "small beautiful one."

== Career ==
Kadogo has educated and performed in Australia, Senegal, Cuba, Brazil, and Hong Kong, and South Korea.

=== Stage ===
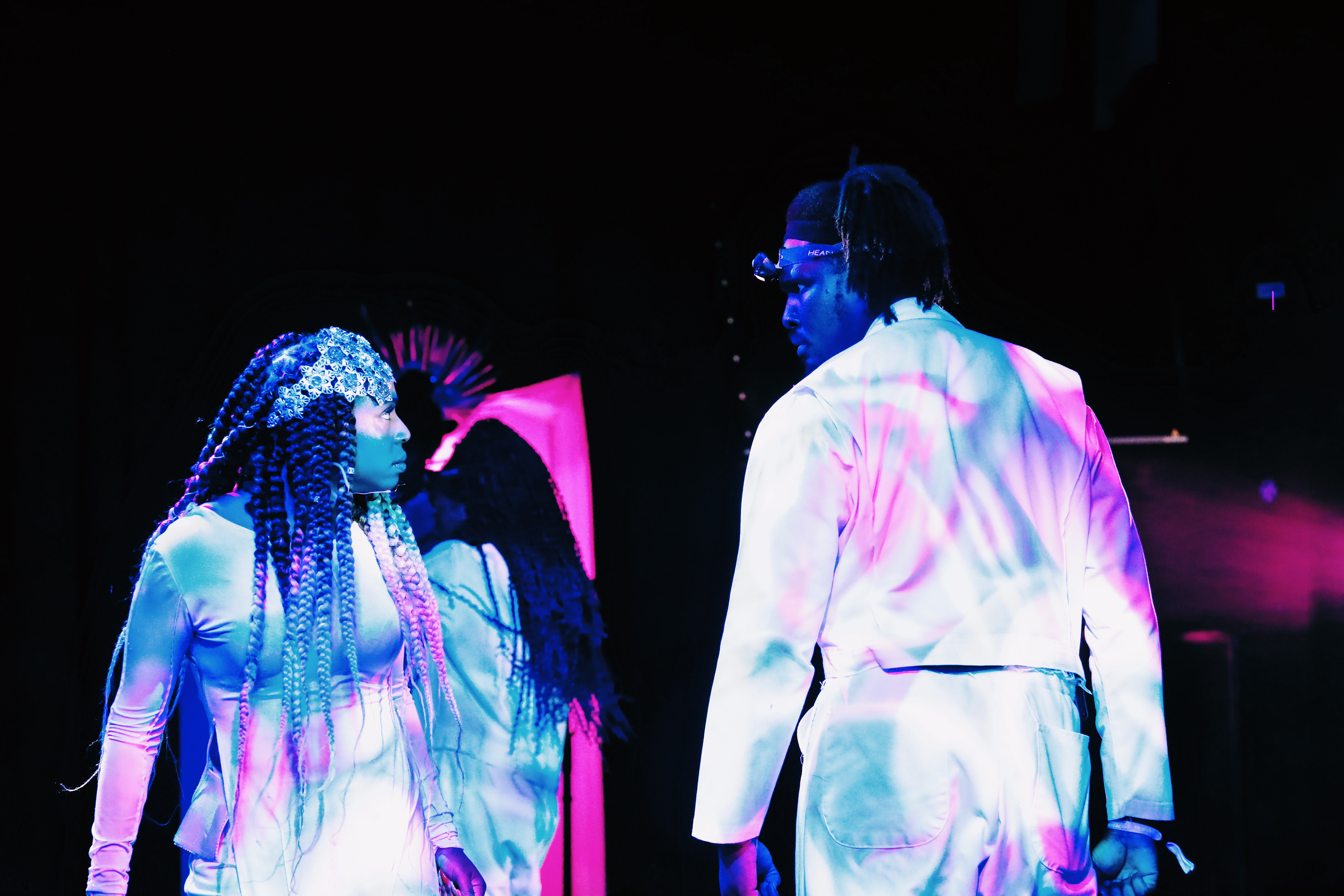
Salt City – A Techno Choreopoem

During her last year at NYU, she met Ntozake Shange and Paula Moss at Dianne McIntyre's Sounds in Motion Dance Studio. She was chosen to perform as the "Lady in Yellow" in For Colored Girls Who Have Considered Suicide / When the Rainbow Is Enuf, which premiered in 1976. Some of the most notable original cast members that performed with Kadogo were Lynn Whitfield and Alfre Woodard. From February to July 1978 the production toured Australia. It was staged first at Her Majesty's in Adelaide, South Australia, as part of the 10th Adelaide Festival of Arts, before touring to Melbourne, Sydney, Townsville, Cairns, and Brisbane. Kadogo and the other original cast featured in the show, while it was directed by Oz Scott. After its last performance, Kadogo decided to remain in Australia, after falling in love with an Australian, and lived there for about 20 years.

In 1988, Kadogo was one of a four-woman dance troupe who called themselves the African Dance Group and performed a show directed by Robyn Archer at The Space Theatre in the Adelaide Festival Centre for the Adelaide Festival of Arts, entitled AKWANSO (Fly South). The others in the group were Pitjantjatjara dancer/actor Lillian Crombie, Ghanaian-Australian dancer/actor/storyteller Dorinda Hafner, and Jamaican Jigzie Campbell. Each woman tells her own story of racial prejudice, which is followed by a dance by all four women, choreographed by Mary Barnett of the Alvin Ailey American Dance Theater.

In Australia, Kadogo took the role of artistic director at the Belvoir St Theatre in Sydney in the 1990s, worked with Aboriginal dancers, and directed a number of significant works. These included Ochre & Dust (2000), commissioned by the Perth and Adelaide Festivals, with set design by Fiona Foley, which was also performed at South Pacific Festival in Noumea, New Caledonia.

Kadogo directed a production of techno-choreopoem Salt City, based on the choreopoem by Jessica Care Moore, which "celebrates Black culture in Detroit: the African-American presence in the city [and] techno-music that was pioneered by African-American men straight out of the Detroit Metropolitan Area". It was staged in 2017 and 2019.

=== Television ===
Kadogo played Snap Jordan in the 1990s Australian children's television series Lift Off.

=== Teaching ===
In a 2005 visit back home, Kadogo was offered the position of director for the Black Theatre Program at Wayne State University. She served in that capacity from 2006 to 2011. After leaving Wayne State, she was appointed as visiting professor at Yong In University in Seoul, South Korea.

In 2014, Kadogo was named Spelman College William and Camille Olivia Hanks Cosby Endowed Professor in the Arts. As of 2019 was serving as the chair for the Department of Theatre and Performance at Spelman College.

Kadogo has developed a teaching philosophy called "rhythm science." Created during her time in Australia, it argues the similarity of musical breaks across all musical genres. She created the technique to help her students better understand rhythm and movement.
