= Sandra Uwiringiyimana =

Author and member of the Banyamulenge tribe

- Born: South Kivu, Democratic Republic of Congo
- Occupation: Author

Sandra Uwiringiyimana is an author and member of the Banyamulenge tribe (also referred to as Tutsi Congolese). Sandra was born in South Kivu, located in the Democratic Republic of Congo, and spent the majority of her childhood in the Congolese city of Uvira. She is a survivor of the Second Congo War, and the 2004 massacre at the refugee camp in Gatumba, Burundi, by the National Liberation Front of Burundi. She spent a few years in Africa as a stateless refugee, before the U.N. offered her family a chance to relocate to America in late 2005. The application and screening process took years, but in April 2007 the family left Africa for Rochester New York.

== Childhood before the massacre ==
Sandra Uwiringiyimana grew up in the Congolese city of Uvira, where she attended a private school and was a star student, consistently landing in the top three of her class. They lived comfortably, her father worked during the days and her mother eventually opened a convenience store out of their house. She had five older siblings, her oldest brother Heritage, Princesse, Chris, Adele, and Alex, then Sandra. She also had a younger sister, named Deborah.

Sandra spent a great deal of her childhood without getting to see Heritage because he was taken by members of the military as a child to serve as a soldier. When her father was not at work, he was searching desperately for his eldest son, who was eventually found. She describes herself as being very close with Alex as she grew up, looking up to him and getting into mischief with him. She played a similar role in her younger sister’s life as well.

Her people, the Banyamulenge, are historically from the Hauts Plateaux, in a village called South Kivu and were always being targeted by other tribes in the region. They looked slightly different because of their Tutsi background, and spoke a different language than most other tribes in Congo which would lead to many issues down the road. Sandra describes her people as stateless since they are welcomed nowhere. While she lived in Congo, she would be bullied for being a Rwandan, and during her time in Burundi and Rwanda, she was persecuted and looked down on for being Congolese.

Sandra describes her life as a child as happy and as normal as could be while living in a state of perpetual warfare. She said that often her family would have to flee the country when violence broke out, and that the worst part for her was missing school. They often fled to Burundi, sometimes for as long as a year, and spent lots of time at refugee camps until the fighting died down.

== Massacre in Gatumba ==
One particular day in June 2004, as Sandra and her family left for school, her father returned home with someone driving a minivan and told the kids to begin packing. They left the house and to Sandra, nothing seemed out of the ordinary, just another conflict they had to run away from. However, 45 minutes into the trip they were stopped by an angry Congolese mob at a checkpoint near the border with Burundi. As the mob closed in on the car the driver took the keys and walked off into the crowd, stranding the family. The crowd began pounding on the van and shaking it, stealing suitcases and mattresses from the roof and anything they could get their hands on from inside the vehicle. The family was physically assaulted by some of the mob. Eventually, a good Samaritan came to their aid, finding the keys and driving them to the border with Burundi. The family finally came across a U.N. refugee camp being set up, and decided to stay there.

They were in the camp for two months in very poor conditions. Tents with tarps hanging inside to create rooms, no mosquito nets, U.N. food rations arrived slowly and the people had to stand in lines all day to receive their rations, the same system was used for water distribution. The only plumbing was outdoors and unsanitary. They slept on mattresses sitting in the grass. Sandra describes the camp in her book How Dare The Sun Rise as demoralizing and demeaning. Seeing her once proud and affluent parents forced to stand in line for hours was hard for her to watch.

On the night of the Gatumba massacre that left 166 people killed and 116 wounded, the attackers stormed the camp chanting Christian songs in Swahili saying “Imana yabatugabiye,” which translates to “God has given you to us.” They were armed with rifles and machetes, and were burning down tents with kerosene as they moved through the camp. Those sharing a tent with Sandra and her family attempted to escape out the rear of the tent by cutting a hole in it, but those who decided to flee that way were gunned down. Those remaining hid quietly under mattresses until members of the Liberation Front voice called to them from outside of the tent saying they had come to save the survivors. Sandra and her family began to exit the tent when the members of the terrorist group opened fire on them, mortally shooting her sister Deborah in the head and shooting Sandra's mother in the side, wounding her. Sandra ran for her life, but was stopped by one of the attackers, who pressed the barrel of his gun to the side of Sandra's skull. After several seconds of deliberation, he kicked her to the ground and ran off in pursuit of a group of adults, allowing Sandra to flee.

After finally reuniting with her family, Sandra and the rest of the survivors found shelter with family outside of Bujumbura. From there Sandra was eventually able to obtain a scholarship to attend a boarding school.

== Life after the attack ==
In late 2005, Sandra’s father learned of a U.N. program relocating survivors of the attack to the United States. The interview and application process took quite a long time, but eventually in April 2007 the family got on a plane headed for Rochester New York to start their new lives. Her older brother Heritage was sent over first by himself because he was over eighteen. After a few weeks in the U.S. without knowing very much English, Sandra started school and was again teased and harassed by her peers for her looks and poor English. She should have been in the eighth grade from her progress made before arriving in America, but because of her language barrier she was placed in sixth grade. She was shocked by how little her classmates cared about school, and despite her lack of English could tell how disrespectful the kids were to the teachers. To Sandra, school was a privilege since the only alternatives were joining the military for the boys, and arranged marriages for the girls.

Sandra eventually met a boy named Abdul from Senegal who spoke some French, which she was fluent in. Abdul helped translate for Sandra to help her with school.

As Sandra’s language skills improved and the family found a church they liked, she became involved with a youth group run by the church and began making more friends. Then, tragedy struck the family again when their father was hit by a van in a hit and run while on his way to pay the bills. He was in a coma for months, and eventually woke up and began to recover.

During this period, Sandra’s English teacher Mrs. Khoji was able to get her a scholarship to an all girls catholic school called Our Lady of Mercy. From there she went on to attend Mercy College.
