= Congolese Australians =

Total population
- 5,522 (by birth, 2016)

Regions with significant populations
- Congolese-born people by state or territory
- Queensland: 1,183
- Victoria: 736
- Western Australia: 711
- South Australia: 678

Languages
- French · English · Swahili

Religion
- Christianity

Related ethnic groups
- African Australians, Central African Australians, South Sudanese Australians, Ugandan Australians, Rwandan Australians, Burundian Australians, Tanzanian Australians, Zambian Australians, Angolan Australians, Cameroonian Australians, Gabonese Australians

Congolese Australians are people who were either born in the Democratic Republic of the Congo or the Republic of the Congo, or are of Congolese heritage, who have since settled in Australia. The Congolese Australian population has seen a marked increase since the end of the 20th century, growing from 21 individuals in 1996, to 5,522 by the 2016 Census. The influx of Congolese immigrants in the 1990s were initially the result of the First Congo War, a civil war in the country of Zaire (present-day Democratic Republic of the Congo), as well as the effects of the Rwandan genocide on the eastern border of the country, which created rebel militia groups, completely destabilizing state authority at the time. According to the 2016 Census, approximately 80% (3,228) of all Congolese-born Australians arrived in Australia between 2006 and 2016, this sudden increase in Congolese immigration was the result of a conflict between the Democratic Republic of the Congo's conflict against the Democratic Forces for the Liberation of Rwanda, an ongoing conflict beginning in 2004. The Congolese Australian population have settled evenly across the country's states and territories, with the largest populations being located in Queensland, Western Australia, and Victoria. Like most African Australians, it is not uncommon for Congolese Australians to experience racism, and research on their experience has been ongoing following their arrival in the early 2000s.

== History ==
The Congo attained independence from Belgium in 1960, however the Belgian preparation of the Congo for this was hasty, and therefore there was not sufficient infrastructure for a new Congolese government to effectively function, and as a result, the 1960s and 1970s saw a couple of internal conflicts.

These internal tensions, resulting from resistance to the rule of the current President Mobutu Sese Seko, existing tensions between existing ethnic groups, and the Rwandan genocide forcing 1.5 million Hutu and Tutsi people to seek refuge in the Congo in 1994 were the causes of the First Congo War, lasting from October 1996 – May 1997, and caused hundreds of thousands of deaths, both of combatants and civilian groups. The government installed after the war by the AFDL (consisting of Rwanda, Uganda, Burundi, Angola, SPLA, and Eritrean aggressors) faced the same issues as Mobutu's administration, and therefore caused the outbreak of the Second Congo War. The 1990s and 2000s saw continuing conflicts, and thereby caused the exodus of 300,000 Congolese people into neighboring countries. Most Congolese people who have arrived in Australia since 2004, have immigrated through the Australian Government's Humanitarian Program. The 2016 Census records that Congolese immigration to Australia prior to 2001 was very small, however, 38.9% (1,596 people) of the Congolese-born Australian population arrived between 2006 and 2010, and an even greater proportion, equaling 39.8% (1,632) arrived between 2011 and 2016, showing a clear increasing trend in the immigration of Congolese nationals to Australia

== Population Distribution ==
Australia's Congolese population has distributed across all the states of Australia since their arrival, the largest concentration of Congolese Australians are located in Queensland, with 1,183 people as of 2016. Victoria, Western Australia and South Australia also have large populations, all over 600 Congolese born people, smaller states and territories; the Northern Territory, Tasmania and the ACT, have a small population. Further, despite being one of the more populous states, New South Wales has a comparatively small Congolese population, with only 550 individuals stating they were born in the Democratic Republic of the Congo.

=== Language ===
In terms of languages, the Congolese Australian community is for the most part, heterogenous; English, French, Lingala, Nyanga and Swahili are the most commonly spoken languages by people who have arrived from the Democratic Republic of the Congo, there is also a wide variation of dialects in their Swahili, leading to difficulty in interpreting and translating; Congolese Swahili, by comparison to Standard Swahili, uses more words with an etymology similar to Bantu, than Arabic. Other official languages of the Democratic Republic of the Congo that may be spoken by Congolese Australians are Kongo and Tshiluba.

Swahili is the most commonly reported first language for those born in the DRC (53%) and the Republic of Congo (36%), followed by French, 17% of DRC arrivals and 29% for the Republic of Congo. According to the 2016 Census, 8.2% of Congolese-born Australians speak English as their sole language, whereas 72.2% of the population are both proficient at English and other languages, with only 18.1% can speak other languages but cannot speak English well.

The wide variety of languages spoken by Congolese-born Australians, including minority languages such as Lingala, means that the Census omits some instances of multilingualism, this can mean that these minority languages may not be reported in the Census. The underreporting of speakers of these languages means that appropriate resources have not been allocated to having interpreters for those languages.

== Social status ==
Racism against Congolese Australians, similarly to all African-Australian groups, is not uncommon, with African Australians feeling as though they are criminalized and scrutinized due to their skin colour, even rejected by the society they are seeking to participate in due to the prejudices of members of the population. Given that most Congolese Australians are fleeing from conflict in their home country, they simultaneously are removed from the country they fled, but also due to this racialization, lack a feeling of belonging.

Access to healthcare is another element of Australian resettlement that has barriers affecting Congolese-born refugees, of these, the commonly reported barriers are the differences between the Australian and Congolese health system, the complexity of the Australian healthcare system and communication issues. The main difference between the two systems is the ease of purchasing medication in Africa when compared with Australia; purchasing necessary medications in Africa did not require a prescription, including antibiotics, unlike Australia where diagnosis and prescription of medicine by a professional is usually required before being allowed to purchase more serious medicines. The Australian pharmacy system can also be a barrier, with the combination of generic and brand names for medicines, requiring multiple medicines for newly diagnosed conditions and prescriptions, none of which are present in the Congolese system. The language barrier is a common problem also, and can make the previous issues more severe, many feel that their English is not adequate to describe their symptoms to a GP or a pharmacist, and made it difficult for healthcare professionals to communicate with their patients.

=== Employment ===
Employment is often used as an indicator for assessing the successful integration of migrants into their new host country for purposes of acculturation, as well as being able to provide for any family members who have migrated with them. Demographic factors are associated with successful employment applications for Congolese Australians; gender, age, English proficiency and how long the applicant has been living in Australia. Male migrants between the ages of 25 and 44 with strong English skills were far more likely to find employment than others, as for length of stay in the host country, the longer the time spent and the greater their understanding of Australian cultural practices, the greater their odds of finding employment. The difficulty in attaining employment status due to these barriers can induce stress in some applicants when compounded with the preexisting stress of needing to adjust living in a new country.

=== Youth ===
Proficiency in English, particularly ability to speak it fluently, is a key factor for successful resettlement of African youths in Australia, youths that were proficient have found settling into Australian culture faster and smoother. The lack of recognition by Australian schools for previous schooling is an existing issue for African youths settling, seeing as older students may not be able to complete their schooling and may be required to attend adult education centers. Having proficiency in the English language is also a barrier for youths seeking to access medical treatment, African Australian youths have a high degree of mental health issues, namely Post-Traumatic Stress Disorder (PTSD) due to the trauma of enforced separation from their home country and potentially even family members.

Finding employment is a challenge for refugee youths from the DRC, given that most job listings in Australia are placed online, refugees who are not familiar with the technologies required to apply for these jobs face additional barriers. Congolese-born refugee youths socialize within their community; playing sports with other Congolese people, or engaging through functions hosted by their local church. Most Congolese-born youths are Christian in belief; oftentimes attending church multiple times in a week, and also serves a social role in the lives of the youths. Financial support is offered to Congolese Australian refugees through welfare, however financial difficulties are still a serious issue, along with the availability of housing.

== Notable people ==
- Future D. Fidel, playwright and novelist born in Uvira in the DRC who came to Australia as a refugee after eight years in a Tanzanian refugee camp; his debut play Prize Fighter, co-produced with La Boite Theatre and featured at the Brisbane Festival in 2015, was nominated for Best New Australian Work at the Helpmann Awards.
- Andrea Solonge, actress of Nigerian and Congolese heritage born in the DRC and 2024 recipient of the Heath Ledger Scholarship.
- Héritier Lumumba, former AFL player of Congolese and Brazilian descent who grew up in Perth, won an AFL premiership with Collingwood Football Club in 2010, received All-Australian honours, and served as the AFL's inaugural Multicultural Ambassador.

== See also ==
- African Australians
- Congolese Americans
