= Fessehaie Abraham =

Eritrean diplomat

Fessehaie Abraham was the first Ambassador of Eritrea to Australia whose term lasted from 1993 to 1997. He was the first recognised Eritrean Australian refugee. He also helped establish the Eritrean Relief Association (ERA) and help The Fred Hollows Foundation spread its boards to Eritrea.

== Life and career ==
Born in 1952 in Eritrea to a family of farmers, Abraham was the first in his family to go to school. In 1970, he went to Addis Ababa, the capital of Ethiopia to study chemistry, however, his university closed down in 1974 due to the Eritrean War of Independence. Abraham tried to leave Ethiopia and return to Eritrea and, in 1976, he attempted to go through Somalia, but gave up. In 1977, he traveled to Kenya, but was detained for being an illegal migrant. He was than accepted by Sudan as a refugee but moved to Australia in 1978 and become the first Eritrean Australian refugee. In 1979, he went to the University of New South Wales and studied chemical engineering, he also established the Eritrean Relief Association (ERA) to help set up an Australian support for Eritrean needs. In 1987, he helped Fred Hollows travel to Eritrea, this allowed Hollows to extend the Fred Hollows Foundation to the borders of Eritrea, this helped improve eye related needs with the Eritrean people as it was seen as a growing issue—even Abraham himself had trachoma, a very common eye disease in Eritrea. In 1991, Eritrea gained its independence and in 1993 Eritrea was quick to set up the Eritrean embassy in the capital of Canberra and appointed Abraham as the first ambassador of Eritrea to Australia, because of him many Eritreans were allowed to enter Australia with ease due to his foreign police rules as he helped create job opportunities between Australians and Eritreans, however he was removed in 1997 due to the fact that he held Eritrean and Australian dual citizenship. He is now retired with his wife and one daughter.
