= Black Australians =

Black Australians most often refers to:

- Indigenous Australians, a term which includes
  - Aboriginal Australians
  - Torres Strait Islanders

Black Australians may also refer to:

- African Australians
  - People from sub-Saharan African countries
  - African-American Australians
  - Caribbean and West Indian Australians when of sub-Saharan African heritage
- Melanesian Australians
  - Fijian Australians
  - Papua New Guinean Australians
  - South Sea Islanders
