= Michael Adonai =

Eritrean visual artist

Michael Adonai (born 5 December 1962) is a visual artist from Eritrea. From an early age, Adonai had an interest in painting, influenced by his older brother Berhane, who went on to also get some notoriety as an Eritrean painter.

At the age of 10 he was hit in a local market bombed by Ethiopia with canisters filled with napalm that ravaged his skin. He joined the Eritrean People's Liberation Front with his brother Berhane in 1977, at the age of 14. This revolutionary organization began Adonai’s formal education in painting with his enrollment at the EPLF Cultural Establishment in 1978. His early work was highly political, choosing to focus on the hardships endured because of the Eritrean War of Independence.

His later work has focused on a traditional painting style in Eritrea known as Coptic art. This change in style grew from Michael's having moved up to the Eritrean Highlands, which by his own admission “Opened my eyes up to the rest of the world”. This is where he first encountered ancient Coptic churches and monasteries believed to be painted with bright vivid color by Egyptian or Syrian Christian missionaries. This bright, vivid use of color, and use of Coptic forms and symbols came to define his work for decades.

In November 2012 he moved to Australia (where he currently lives in Werribee, Victoria) in a hurry, leaving his works in Eritrea. There he studied Fine Art for three years, specializing in painting. He has participated in several art shows and claimed numerous prizes. His work has been shown throughout Eritrea, as well as Ethiopia, Sudan and Italy. Adonai has also authored five books in the Tigrinya language and co-authored two, most notably Hanetay’s Destiny Collection of play, 2012, The verdict of mount Arey Novel, 2012, Windows of Mai Mne Novel, 1998, and Red Mosob Novel, 1998 He is a five-time winner of Eritrea’s national painting competitions, including the prestigious Raimok prize in 2002.
