= Peter Ruehl =

US-Australian newspaper columnist (1947–2011)

Vincent Peter Ruehl (29 March 1947 – 11 April 2011) was an American-born Australian newspaper columnist, best known for the humorous column he wrote thrice weekly for The Australian Financial Review, in which he offered an American view on life in Australia. During his career, he also contributed to The Australian and the Herald Sun.

== Biography ==
Ruehl was born in New York City to Mercedes J. Ruehl, a schoolteacher, and Vincent Ruehl, an FBI agent. His father was of German and Irish descent and his mother was of Cuban and Irish descent. The family frequently moved during his childhood owing to Vincent Ruehl's assignments with the FBI, and lived in other states including Silver Spring, Maryland. He and his sister, Mercedes (who became an Academy Award-winning actress), were raised Catholic.

Ruehl was educated at Gonzaga College High School in Washington, D.C., and later moved to Annapolis. He studied at the University of Maryland and worked as a court reporter for The Baltimore Sun. In 1983, the paper asked him to provide coverage of the 1983 America's Cup in Newport, Rhode Island, during which time he met his future wife, fellow journalist Jennifer Hewett, who had been assigned to the same event by The Sydney Morning Herald. They married and then moved to Australia in 1987. His first piece of journalism in Australia was his coverage of the 1987 America's Cup for the Australian Financial Review, a paper for which he continued to write for most of his career. It was his satirical column in this paper that brought recognition, leading Roger Johnstone (chief executive of the Financial Review Group) to praise him as a "one of a kind in Australian journalism".

After his death, a collection of his columns between November 1993 and April 2011 was published as a book in Men are Stupid, Woman are Crazy.

== Family and personal life ==
At the time of his death, Ruehl lived in the eastern Sydney suburb of Clovelly with Hewett and their children, Mercedes, John and Tom. According to colleague Colleen Ryan, Ruehl had a few close select friends and "could be quite introverted", preferring to spend time with his family or writing.
