= Dorinda Hafner =

- Born: 1947 (age 77–78); Ashanti, West Africa
- Education: St George's Hospital
- Occupations: celebrity chef; television presenter; author; actress; dancer/choreographer; public speaker
- Years active: 1965-present
- Family: Nuala Hafner (daughter)

Dorinda Hafner (born 1947) is a Ghanaian-born Australian celebrity chef, television presenter, author, actress, dancer/choreographer, public speaker and writer. She is also an optician and registered nurse.

== Early life ==
Hafner was born in 1947 in Ghana, West Africa, when it was still a British crown colony called Ashanti. Her father was a surgeon, and her mother a midwife, with her family part of the Ashanti royal family, her grandmother holding the same status as what Princess Anne does to Britain. Hafner grew up in an affluent family but with a mother who taught her how to do manual work as well. Her maternal great-grandfather James Bannerman emigrated to Ghana from Scotland in the 19th century, and Jamestown, Accra is named after him

Hafner was affected by a violent civil war in her country when she was still in primary school. She won a scholarship to the Wesley Girls' Senior High School, Cape Coast, Ghana, where her education taught her more about the British royal family and Europe than Africa and she was influenced by its Methodist ethos.

== Career ==
Hafner after leaving school, aged 18, went to London to train as an ophthalmic nurse. She was the first black registered nurse (RN) trained at St George's Hospital. In London she met her future husband, psychiatrist Julian Hafner, with whom she emigrated in 1977 to Australia, settling in Adelaide, she worked as an RN. At that time, there were very few people of African descent in Adelaide, and she was met with a lot of misunderstanding, and mostly "just annoying and stupid" discrimination rather than deliberate racism.

In 1988, she was one of a four-woman dance troupe who called themselves the African Dance Group and performed a show directed by Robyn Archer at The Space Theatre in the Adelaide Festival Centre for the Adelaide Festival of Arts, entitled AKWANSO (Fly South). The others in the group were Pitjantjatjara dancer/actor Lillian Crombie, African-American dancer and choreographer Aku Kadogo, and Jamaican Jigzie Campbell. Each woman tells her own story of racial prejudice, which is followed by a dance by all four women, choreographed by Mary Barnett of the Alvin Ailey American Dance Theater.

She worked as a television chef and presenter with Bert Newton on Good Morning Australia for ten years.

== Other roles ==
Hafner also espouses humanitarian causes and has worked for several Australian charities. She founded her own charity, called Australian Sponsorship for African Kids.

She is a qualified marriage celebrant.

== Recognition and awards ==
- [Date unknown]: African Australian Woman of the Year
- [Date unknown]: Certificate of Appreciation for Outstanding Leadership & Advocacy for African Women & their communities in SA
- [Dates unknown]: Represented Australia at various Women and Earth Eco-Conferences.
- 1997: South Australian State Ambassador for Australian Citizenship Week
- 2012: "Living Legend" (2012), awarded at the Sydney Opera House
- c. 2012: Named by then Prime Minister Julia Gillard "a people of Australia ambassador"

== Personal life ==
Hafner has two children with her ex-husband Julian: medical specialist James and television presenter and registered psychologist Nuala Hafner, and is described as "first a mother" on one of her agency websites. She had a brief second marriage to an African diplomat, but remained on good terms with her ex-husband Julian.

She speaks five languages, and has spoken openly about the battle with her weight. Over the five years up to 2012, she reduced her weight from 168 kg (370 lb) to 72 kg (159 lb) She wrote the book Honey I've shrunk the chef, published in 2012, about how she did it.

== Publications ==
Hafner is the author of at least eight books, including:

- A Taste of Africa (several editions, from 1993)
- I Was Never Here and This Never Happened:: Tasty Bits & Spicy Tales From My Life (1996)
- Dorinda's Taste of the Caribbean (1996)
- United Tastes of America (3 editions, 1997-8)
- Honey I shrunk the chef (2012)
