= Congolese (Democratic Republic of the Congo) in the United Kingdom =

Democratic Republic of the Congo diaspora in the UK

Congolese in the United Kingdom
Total population
- Democratic Republic of the Congo-born residents 19,510 Congolese-born (2011 census)

Regions with significant populations
- Greater London

Languages
- French, Lingala, British English, Kikongo, Tshiluba and Swahili

Religion
- Roman Catholicism and Anglicanism

Congolese in the United Kingdom consist of immigrants from the Democratic Republic of the Congo (DRC) living in the United Kingdom as well as their British-born descendants. The demonym Congolese can also refer to people from the Republic of Congo, of whom there are fewer living in the UK.

In the 2021 census, 29,009 people in England were recorded as being born in the DRC, as well as 430 in Wales, and 52 in Northern Ireland. The census in Scotland was delayed by a year until 2022. In 2011, 18,913 people born in the DRC were recorded as resident in England, 280 in Wales, 298 in Scotland and 19 in Northern Ireland. In the 2001 UK census 8,569 DRC-born people were residing in the UK.

The majority of Congolese in the United Kingdom have come as political refugees. Congolese migration to the UK is a recent phenomenon, starting in the late 1980s. Significant numbers of Congolese have been coming to the UK as refugees since the early 1990s. According to official data, larger Congolese populations are found in Belgium and France.

Some 11,000 Congolese people are estimated to reside in London, with large numbers being found in Hackney, Edmonton, Tottenham, Newham and Barking & Dagenham where a community of 3,000 Congolese individuals reside. In 2006, community leaders suggested that there might be 30,000 to 40,000 Congolese in the UK, though the International Organization for Migration considers these to be unreliable estimates.

== See also ==
- Democratic Republic of the Congo–United Kingdom relations
- Black British people
