= Somali Australians =

Total population
- 18,401 (by full or partial ancestry, 2021)

Regions with significant populations
- Melbourne · Perth · Brisbane · Townsville

Languages
- Somali, Australian English

Religion
- Islam

Somali Australians are citizens and residents of Australia who are of Somali ancestry.

Although the first Somali community in Victoria was established in 1988, most Somalis began to settle in the country in the early 1990s following the civil war in Somalia. Somali Australians are active in the nation's cultural and political scenes, having also contributed significantly to local business.

== Demographics ==
According to the Australian Bureau of Statistics, the 2006 national census counted 6,403 Somali immigrants residing in Australia.

While the Somali community in Victoria was first established in 1988, most Somalis began to settle in the country in the early 1990s following the outbreak of the civil war in Somalia. About 80 per cent of the new arrivals came under the aegis of the local Refugee and Special Humanitarian Program. As with many other immigrant communities, Somali community organizations are also supported through the national Diverse Australia Program, a grass-roots informational and financial initiative aimed at enhancing societal relations.

Somalis are especially well represented in Victoria, having been drawn to the region's Muslim community, job opportunities and reputation for cultural diversity. The 2006 census reported some 2,624 Somalia-born residents in Victoria, a 14% rise from the previous census five years prior.

The 2016 census recorded 7,668 Somalia-born people in Australia, an increase of 34.9% from the 2011 census, five years earlier. Victoria had 3,904 residents born in Somalia, making up 51% of all Somalia-born people in Australia. Western Australia had 1,334 making up 17.4% of Somalis in Australia and QLD with 1,271 making up 16.6% of Somalis in Australia. The 2021 census recorded 8,101 people born in Somalia. 18,401 people identified as having Somalia ancestry (including partial ancestry), with 54% of these people residing in Victoria.

Census 2021- Identified ancestry as "Somali" (including partial ancestry)
| State of residence | Number of Somali population | Percentage of Somali ancestry in Australia |
|---|---|---|
| Victoria | 10,018 | 54% |
| Queensland | 3,027 | 16% |
| Western Australia | 2,994 | 16% |
| New South Wales | 1,790 | 9% |
| South Australia | 467 | 2.5% |
| Australian Capital Territory (ACT) | 64 | 0.3% |
| Northern Territory | 20 | 0.1% |
| Tasmania | 11 | 0.06% |
| Total | 18,401 | 100% |

== Community ==
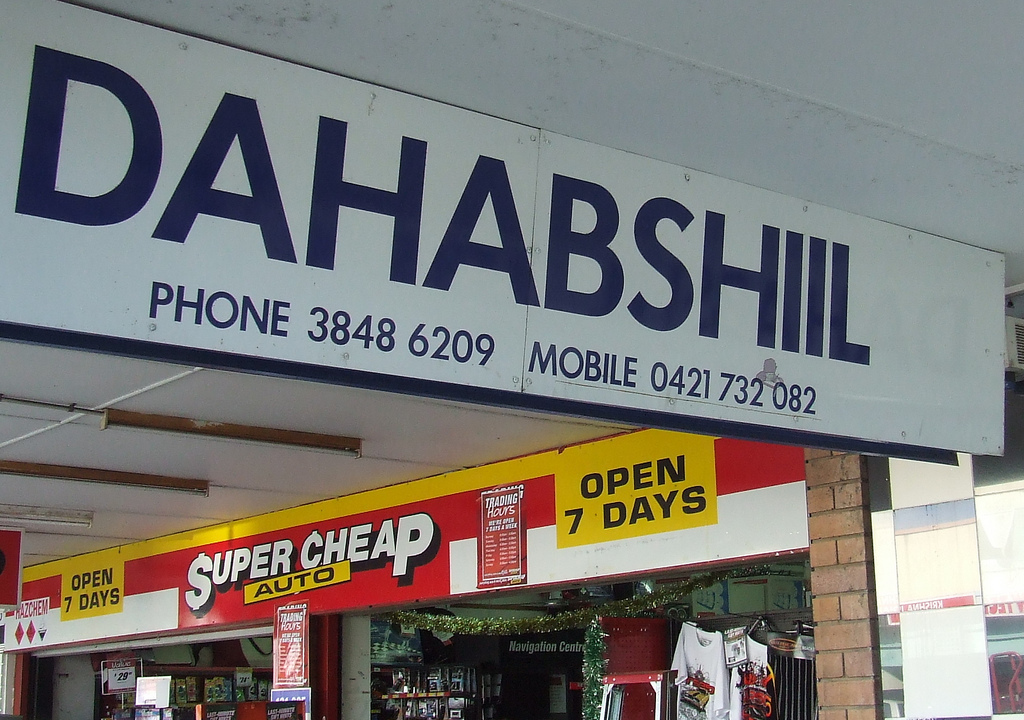
A Dahabshiil franchise outlet in Brisbane, Australia.

While faced with challenges such as having to adjust to life in a new country, learn a foreign language, and support family members back in Somalia, community members have gradually begun to integrate into Victoria's broader multi-cultural society. Most Somali men have found jobs in the transport and production industries, and a rising number of women in the community do clerical work.

Communal support networks have also expanded. In 1988, the Somali Community of Victoria was established to offer support to the local Somali community and to promote Somali culture, as was the Somali Cultural Association seven years later. A Muslim community, the Somali Cultural Association likewise assists Somalis in the country to observe the holy month of Ramadan and the yearly celebrations marking the hajj. Multicultural broadcaster SBS broadcasts an hour-long radio program with news and information in Somali every Wednesday and Friday from 10:00 pm to 11:00 pm. SBS also broadcasts Somali broadcaster Universal TV's Warka news program as part of their "WorldWatch" programming block every Thursday from 10:30 am to 11:00 am.

The Somali community in Queensland is centred around the suburb of Moorooka, where many East African shops are located. However a significant number of Somalis now live in the suburbs of Acacia Ridge and Inala and this can be seen with many African grocery stores and hairdressers in both suburbs. The Somali Community Association of QLD is an organisation that supports Somali Australians in Brisbane and hosts community celebrations such as for Eid and Somali Independence Day. They are based in Inala.

There is also a growing population of Somali Australians in the regional city of Townsville, where they make up a significant proportion of attendees at the Townsville Mosque and local Muslim community. They have opened a restaurant and shops on Ross River Road and are supported by the community organisation, "Bright Horn of Africa: Somali Community Townsville".

Somali Australians are active in the nation's cultural, social and political scenes.

Abdullahi Alim is the CEO of the Africa Future Fund and 2017 WA Young Australian of the Year (Western Australian of the Year Awards). That same year, Abdullahi received the Queen's Young Leader Award from her late Majesty, Queen Elizabeth II at Buckingham Palace. Born in Mogadishu — Alim’s family resettled in Perth having fled the Somali Civil War.

During the 2006 Ethiopian Invasion of Somalia, The Australian Federal Police began to investigate possible links between Islamist splinter groups such as Hizbul Islam and Al Shabaab to the Somali community in Melbourne. The AFP had concluded that around 20 Australians had joined the ranks of numerous jihadist factions in Somalia, with some of these men including the perpetrators of the Holsworthy Barracks Plot. By 2007, one Somali-Australian recruit had been reportedly killed in Mogadishu.

Nur Warsame, who was born in Somalia, is Australia's first openly gay imam.

== See also ==
- Somali diaspora
- African Australians
- Islam in Australia
