= Grande Terre (New Caledonia) =

Pacific island territory of France

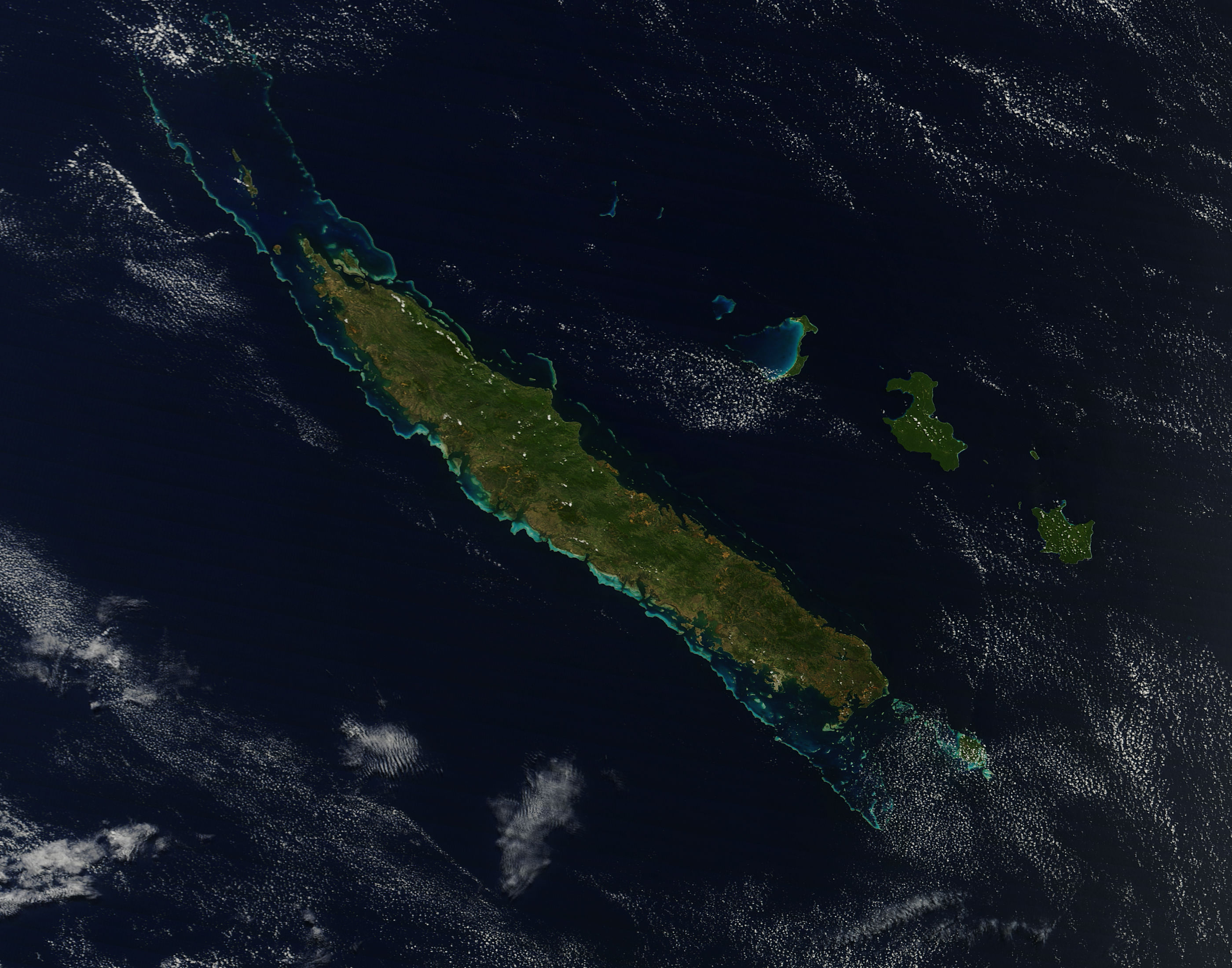
- A satellite photo of the island taken by Terra/MODIS (24 September 2012).

- Location within Pacific Ocean Location within New Caledonia

Geography
- Location: Coral Sea
- Coordinates: 21°17′S 165°21′E
- Archipelago: Melanesia
- Adjacent to: New Caledonian Lagoon
- Area: 16,372 km^{2} (6,321 sq mi)
- Area rank: 53rd

Administration
- France
- Territory: New Caledonia
- Largest settlement: Nouméa

Demographics
- Population: 268,000
- Languages: French (New Caledonian French); Mainland New Caledonian languages (Ajië, Paicî, Xârâcùù, Cèmuhî, Yuanga etc.); Tayo Creole; English; Wallisian
- Ethnic groups: Kanaks; French (Caldoche and Zoreilles); Japanese; Javanese

Additional information
- Time zone: New Caledonia Time (UTC+11)

Grande Terre (French: [ɡʁɑ̃d tɛʁ], Dehu: Mëëke), locally nicknamed Caillou, is the largest and principal island of New Caledonia, which is a territory of France.

== History ==
Until about 37 million years ago, the island was completely submerged under the ocean.

The first humans to settle Grand Terre were the Lapita culture, a branch of the Austronesian peoples, who arrived c. 1000 BC. They lived at a Neolithic level, making pottery and stone tools, and kept pigs, dogs and chickens, and grew taro, yam, coconut, bananas and breadfruit, and ate fish and shellfish, and hunted the notou bird. The Sylviornis bird, similar to a large duck or chicken, was hunted to extinction by the first settlers in a few centuries. From the 11th century AD, Polynesians also settled on Grande Terre.

British explorer James Cook sighted Grande Terre in 1774 and named it "New Caledonia", Caledonia being the Latin name for what is now Scotland. The island's mountains reminded him of Scotland. Eventually, the name "New Caledonia" became applied to Grande Terre (French: 'Big Land') and its surrounding islands.

Cook heard from Māori in New Zealand about Ulimaroa, an island located to the north-northwest, a month's journey away. Some of their ancestors had sailed there, returning with depleted numbers. The inhabitants were said to live on pork. Ulimaroa was originally read as "big red land," and to refer to Australia (which had no pigs, although wombats could be confused for them). However, other writers have theorised it could be ʻo Rimaroa ('the long arm'), and refer to Grand Terre.

It was annexed by the French Empire and became a penal colony in 1853. Today, Grande Terre has about 268,000 residents.

== Geography ==
The largest settlement on Grande Terre is Nouméa, the capital city of New Caledonia. Locals refer to Grande Terre as "Le Caillou", the pebble. The island has a fairly hot and humid climate, though varying as the south-east trade winds bring relatively cool air. Surrounding the island and especially to the north-west is the New Caledonian barrier reef.

The island is located roughly 1,300 kilometres (810 mi; 700 nmi) east of Australia. Grande Terre is oriented northwest-to-southeast; its area is 16,372 square kilometres (6,321 square miles), slightly smaller than Shikoku, Japan. It is nearly 400 kilometres (250 miles) in length and 50–70 km (30–40 mi) wide in most places. A mountain range runs the length of the island, with five peaks over 1,500 metres (4,900 feet). The highest point is Mont Panié at 1,628 m (5,341 ft) elevation. Grande Terre is one of the largest islands in the Pacific Ocean.
