= Languages of New Caledonia =

Languages of the French territory

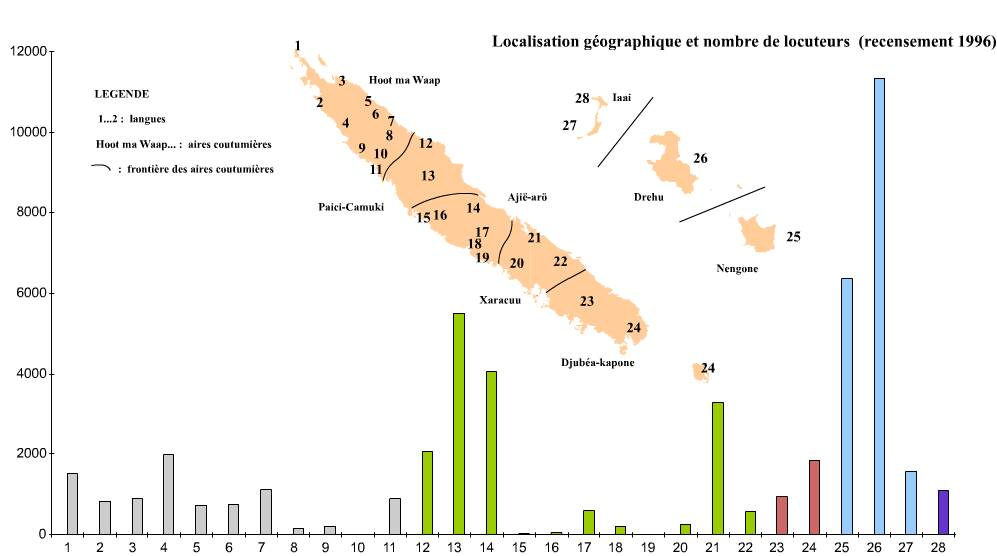
- Indigenous languages of New Caledonia
- Official: French
- Indigenous: Kanak languages
- Vernacular: New Caledonian French, Bislama, Tayo Creole
- Minority: Several immigrant languages
- Foreign: English, Japanese
- Keyboard layout: AZERTY, QWERTY

In New Caledonia, a sui generis collectivity of France, French is the official and predominant language. The collectivity is also home to about thirty New Caledonian languages, which form a branch of the Southern Oceanic languages. They are spoken mainly by the indigenous Kanaks of the islands. Due to the large tourism industry, English is also commonly understood, especially among young people and in tourist areas.

== At the beginning of French rule ==
At the outset of colonisation, Kanaks primarily spoke their native languages, and, in case of need, used Bislama, an Anglo-Melanesian language whose lexical basis is essentially English. This language allowed them to communicate with shopkeepers or with other Melanesian populations. Those native languages were favoured by some Protestant missionaries to evangelise the population, though Catholic missionaries preferred the usage of French.

In 1853, a decree imposed the teaching of French in every school of the colony, and ten years later, only the teaching of French was allowed.

== Present day ==
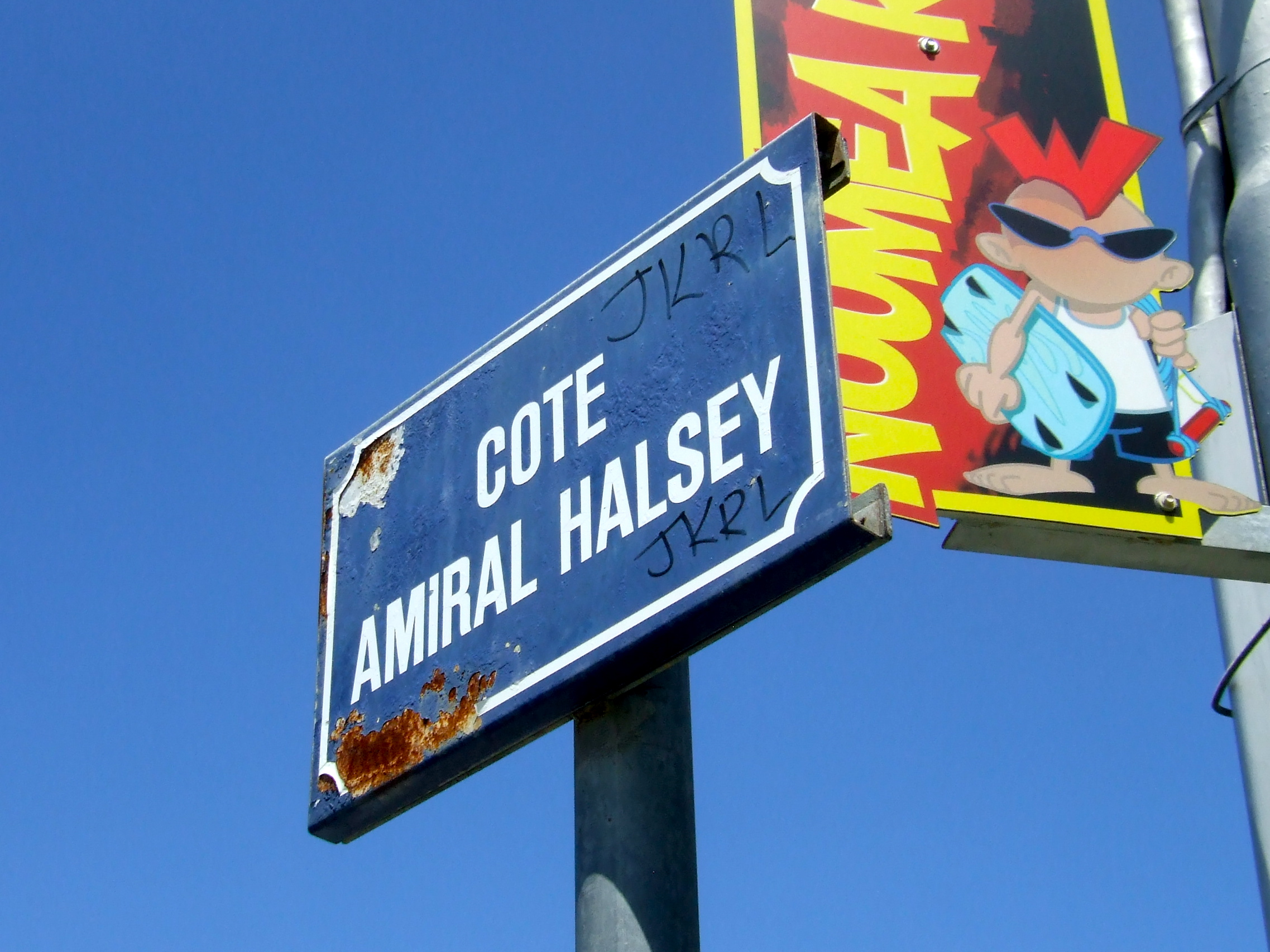
Street sign in French, Nouméa.

New Caledonia's population is constituted of numerous ethnic groups, but most residents are of Kanak, European or mixed origin. Nowadays, there are about 30 Melanesian languages spoken in the territory, as well as languages peculiar to the immigrant populations (Javanese, Vietnamese, Indonesian, Chinese, Indian (Hindi), Filipino and others). Those populations primarily immigrated to New Caledonia during the nickel rush. The native languages of New Caledonia are part of the Austronesian family. This family extends from the island of Madagascar, Taiwan, Southeast Asia and covers almost all of the Pacific.

=== French ===
New Caledonian Pidgin French
- Native speakers: None
- Language family: French-based pidgin
- Dialects: produced Tayo Creole

Language codes
- ISO 639-3: None (mis)
- Glottolog: newc1245

New Caledonians of European descent generally speak French natively, and it is spoken by nearly all the remainder of the population as either a first or second language. New Caledonian French is characterised by some phonetic particularities and specific grammatical constructions derived from native languages and from Australian English.

At the 2009 census, 97.3% of New Caledonians aged 15 or older reported that they could speak, read and write French, whereas only 1.1% reported that they had no knowledge of French. No questions regarding the knowledge of French were asked in the 2014 and 2019 censuses, on account of the population's nearly universal understanding of it.

In the early colonial era, there had been a French pidgin used in New Caledonia as a contact language, especially along the east coast, alongside Bislama, and today there is a local French creole known as Tayo that may descend from it.

=== Indigenous languages ===
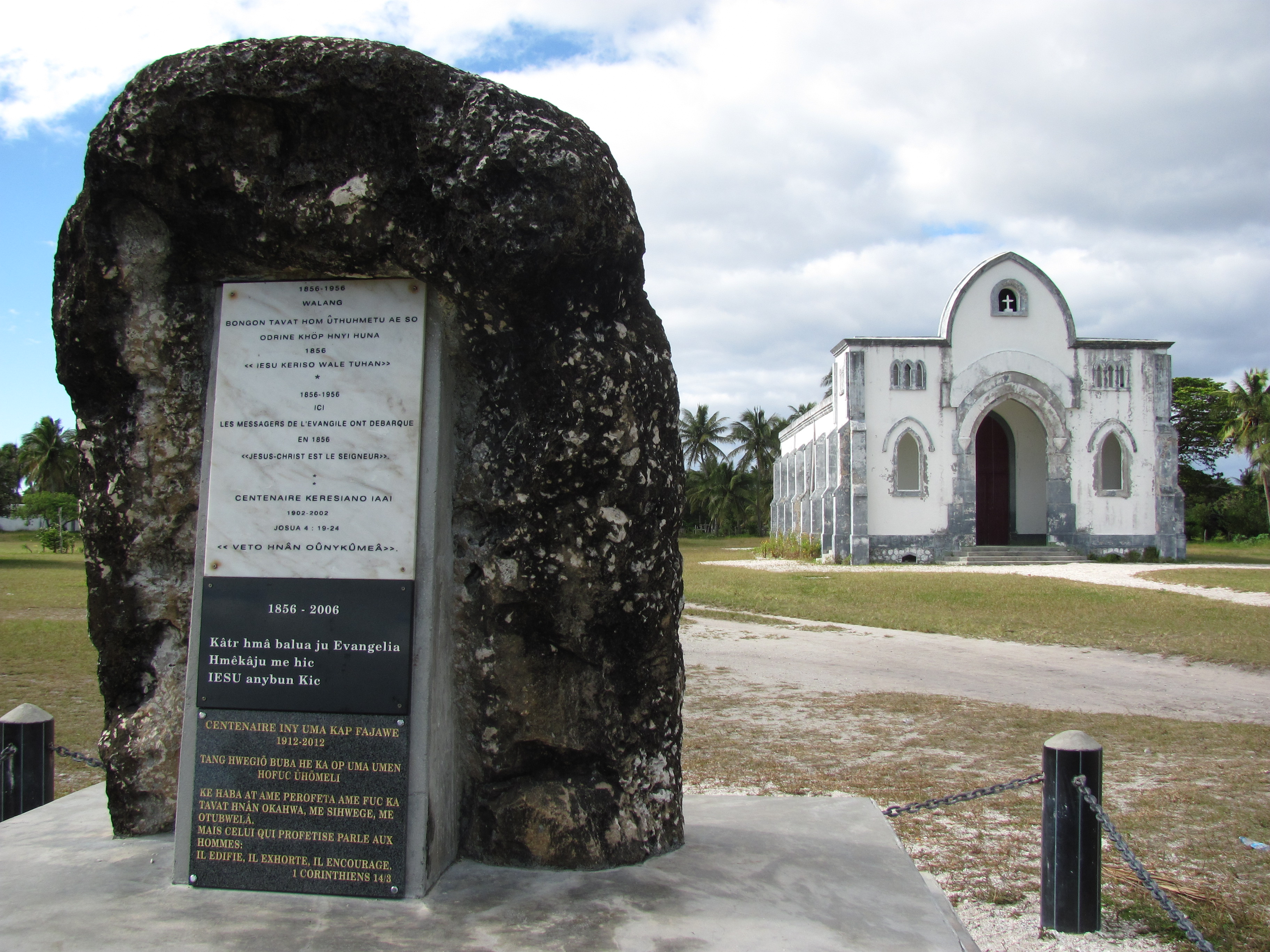
Bilingual Iaai–French inscriptions at a Protestant church on Ouvéa. The Iaai language is in the Loyalty Islands subfamily.

The forty native languages of New Caledonia form two branches of the Southern Oceanic languages, part of the Austronesian family; West Uvean is Polynesian. Their speakers are known as Kanaks. The most important are: Drehu, Nengone, Paicî, Ajië, and Xârâcùù. People living around Nouméa prior to French settlement spoke Ndrumbea. The other languages are spoken by a few hundred to couple thousand people and are endangered. Many Kanaks do not know their native languages very well because of the wide usage of French.

At the 2019 census, 44.0% of people whose age was 15 or older reported that they had some form of knowledge of at least one Kanak language, whereas 56.0% reported that they had no knowledge of any of the Kanak languages.

=== Foreign languages ===
The most commonly taught foreign languages are English and Japanese.

==== English ====
Tourism constitutes an important part of the collectivity's economy, with visitors principally from Australia and New Zealand (who also are major trading partners of the country). English accordingly is understood by many New Caledonians (with most residents having a basic knowledge of English), especially in Nouméa and tourist destinations.

A 2015 study by the University of Technology Sydney (UTS) found that 90% of New Caledonians had studied at least some English at school, due to it being a compulsory school subject.

== Legal status ==
New Caledonia being a part of French Republic, its official language is French, following the constitutional law 92-554 (June 1992). This law is applicable to every field (justice, tribunals, administration, schools...). At the level of legislation and justice, on some occasions individuals may have recourse to a Melanesian language (in spoken conversation, for example). A series of decrees and clauses allow the usage of Melanesian languages in education in some cases. Notably, the "Loi d’orientation d’Outre-Mer" (law 2000-1207, December 2000) stipulates that respect must be shown to indigenous languages, owing to their importance to New Caledonian culture.

== Education ==
Secondary school is under State authority (as opposed to nursery and primary school, which are under Provincial authority), therefore, the language in application is French. Some schools give optional native languages lessons, but it is still very rare. Nevertheless, four languages are proposed at the baccalaureate: Ajië, Drehu, Nengone and Paicî. English is a compulsory subject, with a 2015 study by the University of Technology Sydney (UTS) having reported that 90% of respondents had learnt at least some English in school, and that it was more common and more valued among younger generations.

There has been controversy about the educational system, as it has been argued that its programs are not adapted to the needs of the local population. As a French overseas collectivity New Caledonia is almost exclusively under the administrative control of France at the educative level and the textbooks are tailored to European students. Moreover, French is only a second language for significant minority of New Caledonians. This situation has been described as a major cause for the high rate of illiteracy and academic failure by New Caledonian students, whose success rate at the baccalaureate is very low. Some have advocated to increase the importance of native languages as a teaching medium in school, while reducing the status of French to that of a second language. Critics have claimed that this proposal denies reality as French is the predominant native language among New Caledonian students.
