= Blanky =

Blanky may refer to:

- A blanket
  - A security blanket, often spelled blankie in this context
- Blanky, the expletive "bloody" (euphemistically)
- Blanky, the electric blanket character in the novel and film The Brave Little Toaster
- Thomas Blanky, (1804 – 1848/51?) English sailor and ice master on HMS Terror
