= Taio (disambiguation) =

Taio is a comune in the province of Trento, Italy

Taio may also refer to:

- Taio Cruz, English R&B singer
- Taio Matsuo, fictional character in Sakigake!! Otokojuku
- Teremoana Tapi Taio, Cook Islands politician
- Taius, Spanish author and bishop
- Tai O, Lantau Island, Hong Kong
- Taió, a town in Brazil

== See also ==
- Tayo (disambiguation)
