= Tayo =

Tayo or TAYO may refer to:

== Arts, entertainment, and media ==
- Tayo The Little Bus, a South Korean animated television series

== Businesses and organizations ==
- Tayo (political party), a political party based in Mogadishu, Somalia
- TAYO Awards, an award program in the Philippines
- Tayo Rolls, Indian metal fabrication and processing company

== People ==
listen

=== Given name ===
- Tayo Adenaike (born 1954), Nigerian painter
- Tayo Aderinokun (1955–2011), Nigerian entrepreneur
- Tayo Edun (born 1998), British professional football player
- Tayo Fabuluje (born 1991), American football player
- Tayo Lamidi (born 1965), Nigerian academic
- Tayo Ogedengbe (born 1987), British basketball player
- Tayo Oviosu (born 1977), Nigerian, founder and CEO of Paga
- Tayo Popoola (born 1981), British musician and DJ
- Tayo Reed (born 1973), American country music singer
- Tayo Singerr (born 2007), English footballer
- Tayo Sound (born 2002), British singer-songwriter
- Tayo Walbrugh (born 1996), South African cricketer

=== Surname ===
- Lyle Tayo (1889-1971), American film actress
- Michael Tayo (born 1987), Nigerian football player

== Other uses ==
- Tayo Creole, a French-based Creole spoken in New Caledonia
