= New Caledonian French =

Variety of French spoken in New Caledonia

- français néo-caledonien
- Pronunciation: [fʁɑ̃sɛ neɔkaledɔnjɛ̃]
- Native to: New Caledonia
- Ethnicity: New Caledonians
- Language family: Indo-European: Italic; Latino-Faliscan; Latin; Romance; Italo-Western; Western Romance; Gallo-Iberian; Gallo-Romance; Gallo-Rhaetian?; Arpitan–Oïl; Oïl; French; Oceanian French; New Caledonian French
- Early forms: Old Latin: Vulgar Latin; Proto-Romance; Old Gallo-Romance; Old French; Middle French; Metropolitan French
- Writing system: Latin (French alphabet); French Braille

Official status
- Official language in: New Caledonia

Language codes
- ISO 639-3: –
- Linguasphere: 51-AAA-ipa
- IETF: fr-NC

New Caledonian French (French: français néo-calédonien, [fʁɑ̃sɛ neɔkaledɔnjɛ̃]), also known as Caledonian French (French: français calédonien, [fʁɑ̃sɛ kaledɔnjɛ̃]), is a dialect of French spoken in New Caledonia. It is the mother tongue of Caldoches, while it is usually a second language for Kanaks and immigrant groups in New Caledonia. It contains heavy influences from Metropolitan French (often using colonial, military, prison or vulgar terminology), Kanak languages, Tayo Creole, Australian English, Tahitian, Wallisian, Bislama, Javanese and Vietnamese.

While French is not a first language for a large number of New Caledonians, it is the official language of the territory and is almost universally understood as a lingua franca. In the 2009 census, the last census in which knowledge of French was a question, 97.5% of New Caledonians aged 15 and older stated that they could speak, read and write French, while just 1.1% reported having no knowledge of French.

== Vocabulary and influences ==
New Caledonian French is primarily based on Metropolitan French, though much of the terminology used is from colonial, military, prison or vulgar contexts. influenced by a wide variety of other languages, namely Kanak languages, trade and tourism languages such as Australian English, creole languages such as Bislama and Tayo Creole, and immigrant languages such Javanese, Tahitian, Vietnamese and Wallisian.

=== French ===
Standard French, particularly European French, is the core basis of New Caledonian French. However, there are differences in terminology. For example, a beer bottle is known as a topette in New Caledonia as opposed to a bouteille de bière.

=== English ===
New Caledonian vocabulary has been highly influenced from Anglicisms borrowed from English, particularly from Australian and New Zealand English through the mining industry, immigration, trade and tourism, as well as due to many Kanaks being blackbirded to work on sugarcane plantations in Queensland and northern New South Wales. These influences only strengthened in World War II, when Anglophone troops from Australia, New Zealand and the United States were in New Caledonia.

Anglo-Celtic Australian English has been the principal source of Anglicisms in New Caledonian French. This is especially true in agricultural terminology, with terms such as paddock (a field), run (a group of large plots of land used for pasturing livestock), station (a ranch), stock (one's livestock), stockman (a cowboy), stockwhip (a cowboy or farmer's whip) and stockyard (a yard where livestock are kept) having all entered New Caledonian French from Australian English.

Other Anglicisms present in New Caledonian French include blady (an eye dialect spelling of and with the same meaning as the intensifier "bloody"), carport (as opposed to garage), creek (a type of stream smaller than a river, commonly found on Grande-Terre), ice cream (used alongside glace), Poken (an English speaker, usually an Australian or a New Zealander but occasionally applied to the British; derived from the phrase "English spoken" used on business signs) and tata (au revoir, goodbye; derived from 19th century Australian English), as well as the place name Fern Hill (a mine in Ouégoa).

Anglicisms are not limited to new terminology, as many existing Anglicisms also used in Metropolitan French are pronounced closer to their English pronunciation. For example, bus is pronounced [bys] in Metropolitan France, while the English pronunciation [bʌs] is used in New Caledonia.

=== Kanak languages ===
The 30 indigenous New Caledonian languages, spoken by the indigenous Kanak people, have all influenced New Caledonian French. While some words are primarily used in Kanak French, many other Caledonians also use terms derived from Kanak languages in everyday French. For example, the term yossi is a common expression of surprise, admiration or upset in New Caledonian French, and is derived from the Drehu language spoken on Lifou in the Loyalty Islands.

=== Creole languages ===
Various creole languages have influenced New Caledonian French (especially Kanak French), primarily Bislama (the English-based creole used as a lingua franca in nearby Vanuatu) and Tayo Creole (a French-based creole spoken in the village of Saint-Louis in Le Mont-Dore). Examples include kaï-kaï (food, derived from Bislama kaikai) and nakamal (a meeting place; derived from Bislama).

The term Zoreille (often shortened to Zozo) referring to French people born in Metropolitan France (as opposed to Caldoches who were born in New Caledonia and descend from earlier settlers) is derived from Réunion Creole (in which it literally translates to "ears", from French les oreilles meaning "the ears"), where it has been adopted into the local French dialect to refer to Metropolitan French people living in Réunion. The term is also used in French Polynesia, the Lesser Antilles and Mauritius.

=== Genericised trademarks ===
Various brand names have become genericised trademarks in New Caledonian French, despite most products being foreign and often imported to New Caledonia from Australia or Metropolitan France.

Examples of genericised trademarks include aérogard for insect repellent (from Aerogard) and sao for savoury crackers (from SAO).

== See also ==
- Languages of New Caledonia
- Tayo Creole, a French-based creole primarily spoken in Saint-Louis near Nouméa
