= Australian English =

Set of varieties of English language

- Native to: Australia
- Native speakers: 18.5 million in Australia (2021); 5 million L2 speakers of English in Australia (approx. 2021)
- Language family: Indo-European: Germanic; West Germanic; North Sea Germanic; Anglo-Frisian; Anglic; English; Australian English
- Early forms: Old English: Middle English; Early Modern English; Modern English; late 18th century British English; 19th century British English
- Writing system: Latin (English alphabet); Unified English Braille

Language codes
- ISO 639-3: –
- Glottolog: aust1314
- IETF: en-AU

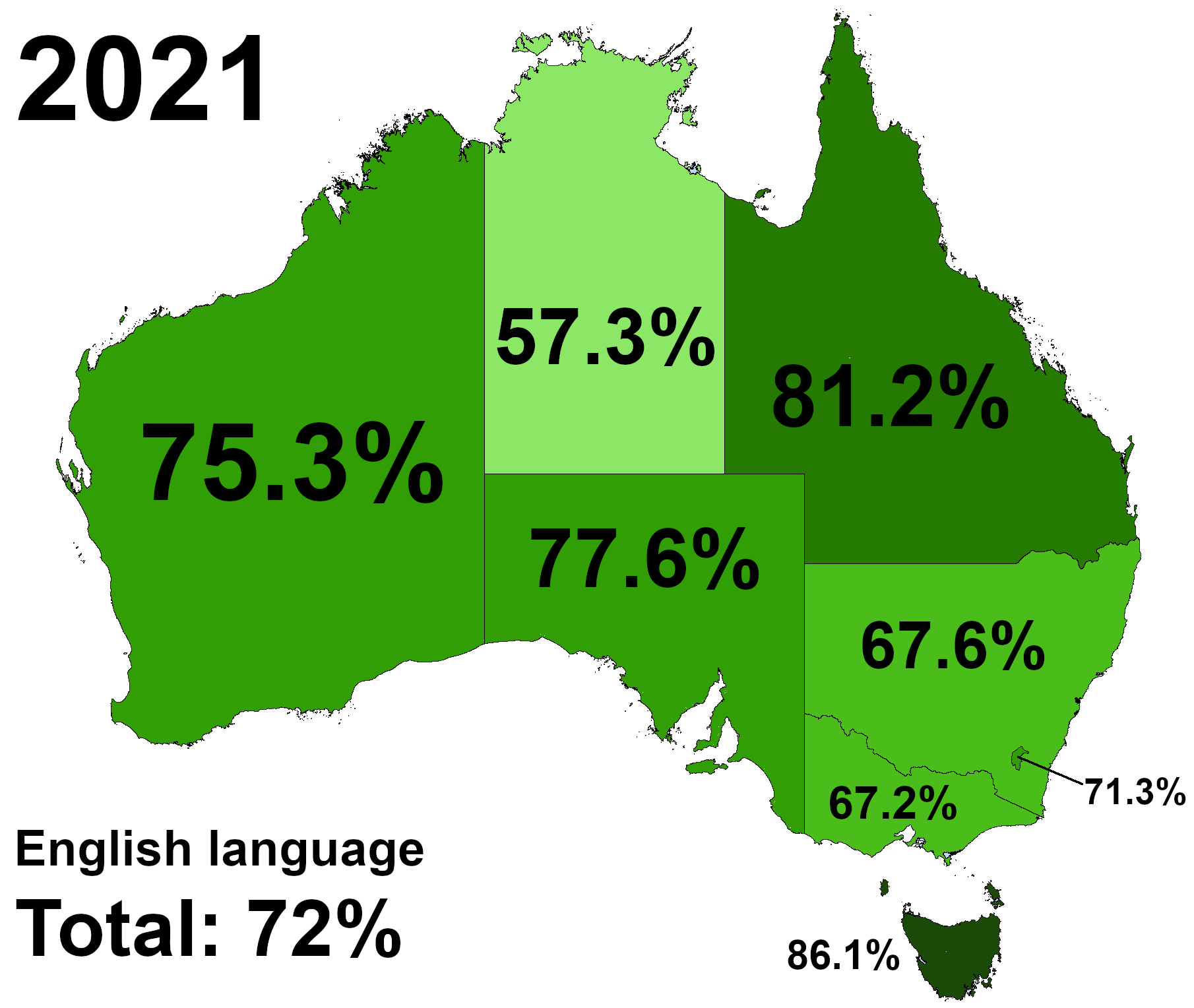
The percentage of people who speak only the English language at home, 2021

Australian English (locally /əˈstɹæɪljən ˈɪŋɡləʃ/; AusE, AusEng, AuE, AuEng, en-AU) is the set of varieties of the English language native to Australia. It is the country's common language and de facto national language. While Australia has no official language, English is the first language of the majority of the population, and has been entrenched as the de facto national language since the onset of British settlement, being the only language spoken in the home for 72% of Australians in 2021. It is also the main language used in compulsory education, as well as federal, state and territorial legislatures and courts.

Australian English began to diverge from British and Hiberno-English after the First Fleet established the Colony of New South Wales in 1788. Australian English arose from a dialectal melting pot created by the intermingling of early settlers who were from a variety of dialectal regions of Great Britain and Ireland, though its most significant influences were the dialects of Southern England. By the 1820s, the native-born colonists' speech was recognisably distinct from speakers in Britain and Ireland.

Australian English differs from other varieties in its phonology, pronunciation, lexicon, idiom, grammar and spelling. Australian English is relatively consistent across the continent, although it encompasses numerous regional and sociocultural varieties. "General Australian" describes the de facto standard dialect, which is perceived to be free of pronounced regional or sociocultural markers and is often used in the media.

== History ==
Similar to early American English, Australian English passed through a process of extensive dialect levelling and mixing which produced a relatively homogeneous new variety of English which was easily understood by all.

The earliest Australian English was spoken by the first generation of native-born colonists in the Colony of New South Wales from the end of the 18th century. These native-born children were exposed to a wide range of dialects from across the British Isles. The dialects of Southern England, including most notably the traditional Cockney dialect of London, were particularly influential on the development of the new variety and constituted "the major input of the various sounds that went into constructing" Australian English. All the other regions of England were represented among the early colonists. A large proportion of early convicts and colonists were from Ireland (comprising 25% of the total convict population), and many of them spoke Irish as a sole or first language. They were joined by other non-native speakers of English from the Scottish Highlands and Wales. Peter Miller Cunningham's 1827 book Two Years in New South Wales described the distinctive accent and vocabulary that had developed among the native-born colonists.

The first of the Australian gold rushes in the 1850s began a large wave of immigration, during which about two percent of the population of the United Kingdom emigrated to the colonies of New South Wales and Victoria. The Gold Rushes brought immigrants and linguistic influences from many parts of the world. An example was the introduction of vocabulary from American English, including some terms later considered to be typically Australian, such as bushwhacker and squatter. This American influence was continued with the popularity of American films from the early 20th century and the influx of American military personnel that settled in Australia and New Zealand during World War II; seen in the enduring persistence of such universally-accepted terms as okay and guys.

The publication of Edward Ellis Morris's Austral English: A Dictionary Of Australasian Words, Phrases And Usages in 1898, which extensively catalogued Australian English vocabulary, started a wave of academic interest and codification during the 20th century which resulted in Australian English becoming established as an endonormative variety with its own internal norms and standards. This culminated in publications such as the 1981 first edition of the Macquarie Dictionary, a major English language dictionary based on Australian usage, and the 1988 first edition of The Australian National Dictionary, a historical dictionary documenting the history of Australian English vocabulary and idiom.

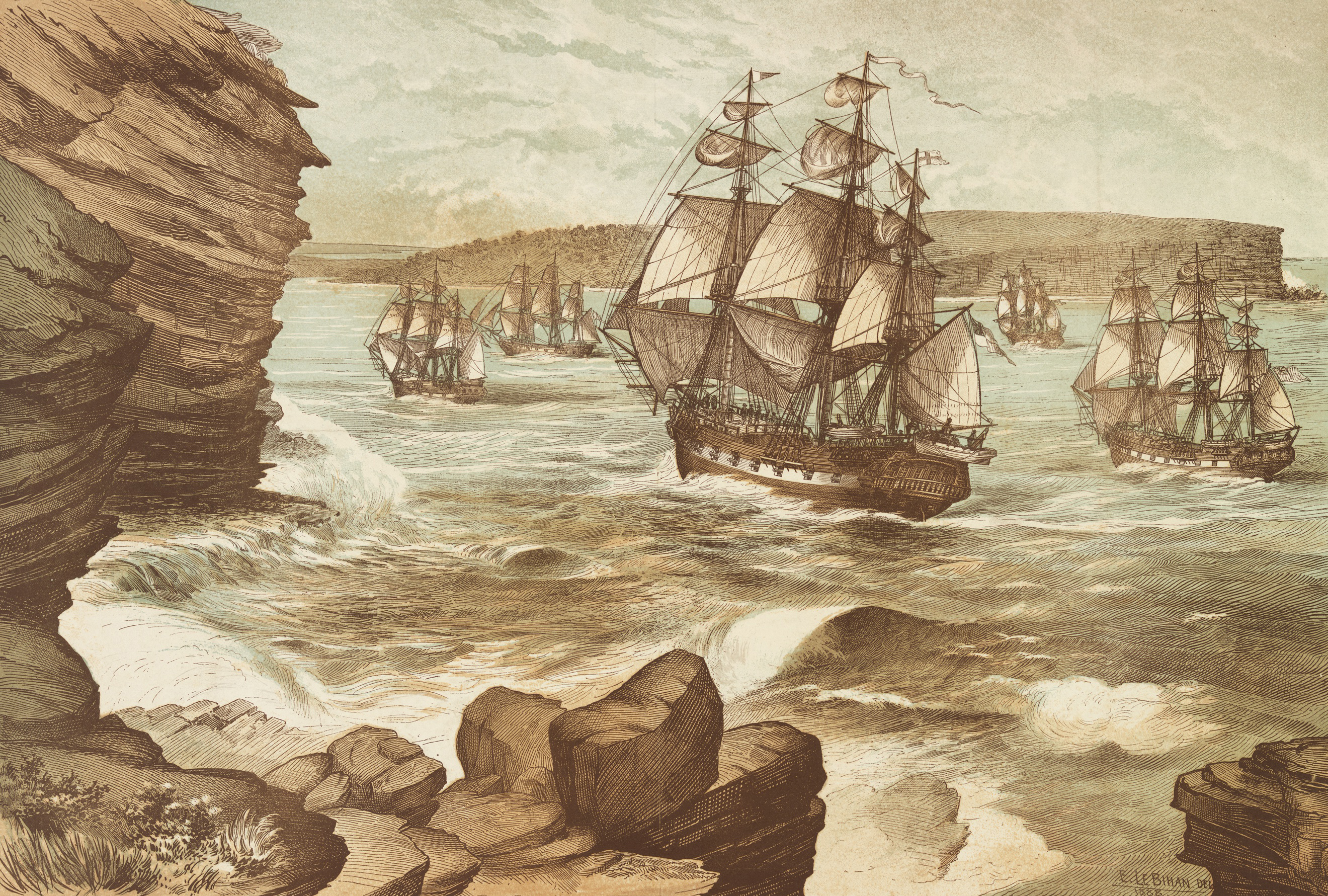
The First Fleet, which brought the English language to Australia

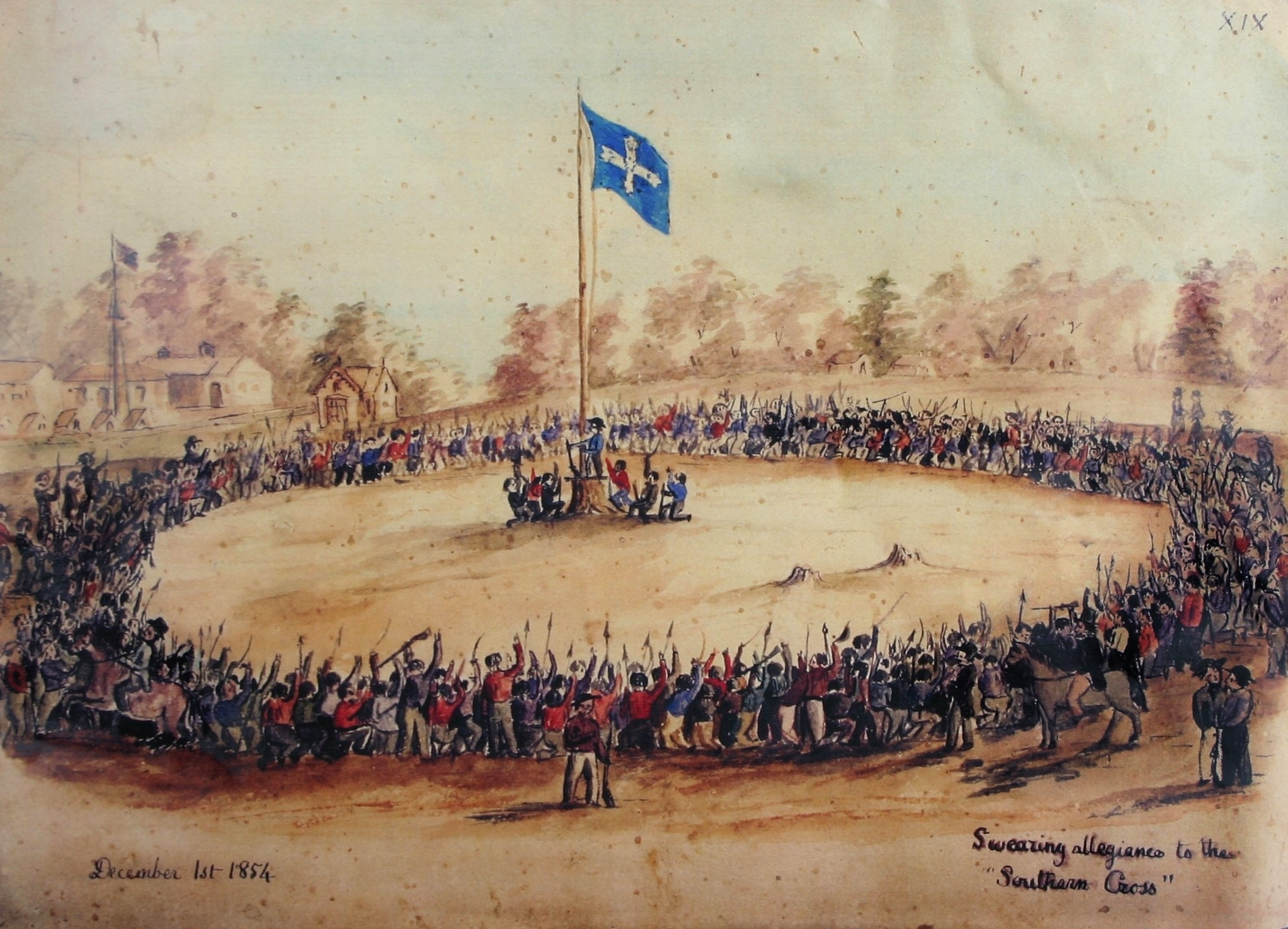
The Australian gold rushes saw many external influences on the language.

== Phonology and pronunciation ==
The most obvious way in which Australian English is distinctive from other varieties of English is through its unique pronunciation. It shares most similarity with New Zealand English. Like most dialects of English, it is distinguished primarily by the phonetic quality of its vowels.

=== Vowels ===
Australian English monophthongs

Part 1 of Australian English diphthongs

Part 2 of Australian English diphthongs

The vowels of Australian English can be divided according to length. The long vowels, which include monophthongs and diphthongs, mostly correspond to the tense vowels used in analyses of Received Pronunciation (RP) as well as its centring diphthongs. The short vowels, consisting only of monophthongs, correspond to the RP lax vowels.

There exist pairs of long and short vowels with overlapping vowel quality giving Australian English phonemic length distinction, which is also present in some regional south-eastern dialects of the UK and eastern seaboard dialects in the US. An example of this feature is the distinction between ferry /ˈfeɹiː/ and fairy /ˈfeːɹiː/.

As with New Zealand English and General American English, the weak-vowel merger is complete in Australian English: unstressed /ɪ/ is merged into /ə/ (schwa), unless it is followed by a velar consonant. Examples of this feature are the following pairings, which are pronounced identically in Australian English: Rosa's and roses, as well as Lennon and Lenin. Other examples are the following pairs, which rhyme in Australian English: abbott with rabbit, and dig it with bigot.

The bad-lad split, a phonemic split which splits the /æ/ vowel into two separate phonemes: /æ/ and /æː/ is also present in speakers of Australian English, as well as in some speakers of Standard Southern British English (SSBE). A minimal pair can be seen through the comparison of the verb can /'kæn/ (strong form) and the noun can /'kæːn/. Further minimal pairs may be seen below:

/æ/	/æː/	Notes
can (verb)	can (noun)	Is only a minimal pair when can is in its strong form
span (verb)	span (noun)	Only present in speakers who use span as the past of spin
Manning	manning	
planet	plan it	

Most varieties of Australian English exhibit only a partial trap-bath split. The words bath, grass and can't are always pronounced with the "long" /ɐː/ of father. Throughout the majority of the country, the "flat" /æ/ of man is the dominant pronunciation for the a vowel in the following words: dance, advance, plant, example and answer. The exception is the state of South Australia, where a more advanced trap-bath split is found, and where the dominant pronunciation of all the preceding words incorporates the "long" /ɐː/ of father.

monophthongs				diphthongs	
short vowels		long vowels		diphthongs	
IPA	examples	IPA	examples	IPA	examples
ʊ	foot, hood, chook	ʉː (Note: The vowel /ʉː/ is diphthongised in all the major Australian accents; in General Australian, the most widespread Australian accent, the vowel is pronounced as [ɪ̈ɯ]. See Australian English phonology for a more detailed analysis.)	goose, boo, who'd	ɪə	near, beard, hear (Note: The boundary between monophthongs and diphthongs is somewhat fluid: /ɪə/, for example, is commonly realised as [ɪː], particularly in closed syllables, though also found in open syllables such as we're, here, and so on. In open syllables particularly, the pronunciation varies from the bisyllabic [ɪːa], through the diphthong [ɪə], to the long vowel [ɪː].)
ɪ	kit, bid, hid,	iː (Note: The vowel /iː/ has an onset [ɪi̯], except before laterals. The onset is often lowered to [əi], so that "beat" is [bəit] for some speakers.)	fleece, bead, heat	æɔ	mouth, bowed, how'd
e/ɛ	dress, led, head	eː/ɛː	square, bared, haired	əʉ	goat, bode, hoed
ə	comma, about, winter	ɜː	nurse, bird, heard	æɪ	face, bait, made
æ	trap, lad, had	æː	bad, sad, mad	ɑe	price, bite, hide
ɐ	strut, bud, hud	ɐː	start, palm, bath	oɪ	choice, boy, oil
ɔ	lot, cloth, hot	oː	thought, north, force		

=== Consonants ===
There is little variation in the sets of consonants used in different English dialects but there are variations in how these consonants are used. Australian English is no exception.

Australian English consonant phonemes
		Labial	Dental	Alveolar	Post- alveolar	Palatal	Velar	Glottal
Nasal		m		n			ŋ	
Plosive	fortis	p		t			k	
Plosive	lenis	b		d			ɡ	
Affricate	fortis				tʃ			
Affricate	lenis				dʒ			
Fricative	fortis	f	θ	s	ʃ			h
Fricative	lenis	v	ð	z	ʒ			
Approximant	median			ɹ		j	w	
Approximant	lateral			l				

Australian English is uniformly non-rhotic; that is, the /ɹ/ sound does not appear at the end of a syllable or immediately before a consonant. As with many non-rhotic dialects, linking /ɹ/ can occur when a word that has a final ⟨r⟩ in the spelling comes before another word that starts with a vowel. An intrusive /ɹ/ may similarly be inserted before a vowel in words that do not have ⟨r⟩ in the spelling in certain environments, namely after the long vowel /oː/ and after word final /ə/. This can be heard in "law-r-and order", where an intrusive R is voiced between the AW and the A.

As with North American English, intervocalic alveolar flapping is a feature of Australian English: prevocalic /t/ and /d/ surface as the alveolar tap [ɾ] after sonorants other than /m, ŋ/ as well as at the end of a word or morpheme before any vowel in the same breath group. Examples of this feature are that the following pairs are pronounced similarly or identically: latter and ladder, as well as rated and raided.

Yod-dropping generally occurs after /s/, /l/, /z/, /θ/ but not after /t/, /d/ and /n/. Accordingly, suit is pronounced as /sʉːt/, lute as /lʉːt/, Zeus as /zʉːs/ and enthusiasm as /enˈθʉːziːæzəm/. Other cases of /sj/ and /zj/, as well as /tj/ and /dj/, have coalesced to /ʃ/, /ʒ/, /tʃ/ and /dʒ/ respectively for most speakers, especially younger women. /j/ is generally retained in other consonant clusters.

In common with most varieties of Scottish English and American English, the phoneme /l/ is pronounced by Australians as a "dark" (velarised) l ([ɫ]) in almost all positions, unlike other dialects such as Received Pronunciation, Hiberno (Irish) English, etc.

=== Pronunciation ===
Differences in stress, weak forms and standard pronunciation of isolated words occur between Australian English and other forms of English, which while noticeable do not impair intelligibility.

The affixes -ary, -ery, -ory, -bury, -berry and -mony (seen in words such as necessary, mulberry and matrimony) can be pronounced either with a full vowel (/ˈnesəseɹiː, ˈmalbeɹiː, ˈmætɹəməʉniː/) or a schwa (/ˈnesəsəɹiː, ˈmalbəɹiː, ˈmætɹəməniː/). Although some words like necessary are almost universally pronounced with the full vowel, older generations of Australians are relatively likely to pronounce these affixes with a schwa as is typical in British English. Meanwhile, younger generations are relatively likely to use a full vowel.

Words ending in unstressed -ile derived from Latin adjectives ending in -ilis are pronounced with a full vowel, so that fertile /ˈfɜːtɑel/ sounds like fur tile rather than rhyming with turtle /ˈtɜːtəl/.

In addition, miscellaneous pronunciation differences exist when compared with other varieties of English in relation to various isolated words, with some of those pronunciations being unique to Australian English. For example:

- As with American English, the vowel in yoghurt /ˈjəʉɡət/ and the prefix homo- /ˈhəʉməʉ/ (as in homosexual or homophobic) are pronounced with GOAT rather than LOT;
- Vitamin, migraine and privacy are all pronounced with /ɑe/ in the stressed syllable (/ˈvɑetəmən, ˈmɑeɡɹæɪn, ˈpɹɑevəsiː/) rather than /ˈvɪtəmən, ˈmiːɡɹæɪn, ˈpɹɪvəsiː/;
- Dynasty and patronise, by contrast, are usually subject to trisyllabic laxing (/ˈdɪnəstiː, ˈpætɹɔnɑez/) like in Britain, alongside US-derived /ˈdɑenəstiː, ˈpæɪtɹɔnɑez/;
- The prefix paedo- (as in paedophile) is pronounced /ˈpedəʉ/ rather than /ˈpiːdəʉ/;
- In loanwords, the vowel spelled with ⟨a⟩ is often nativised as the PALM vowel (/ɐː/), similar to American English (/ɑː/), rather than the TRAP vowel (/æ/), as in British English. For example, pasta is pronounced /ˈpɐːstə/, analogous to American English /ˈpɑstə/, rather than /ˈpæstə/, as in British English.
- Urinal is stressed on the first syllable and with the schwa for I: /ˈjʉːɹənəl/;
- Harass and harassment are pronounced with the stress on the second, rather than the first syllable;
- The suffix -sia (as in Malaysia, Indonesia and Polynesia, but not Tunisia) is pronounced /-ʒə/ rather than /-ziːə/;
- The word foyer is pronounced /ˈfoɪə/, rather than /ˈfoɪæɪ/;
- Tomato, vase and data are pronounced with /ɐː/ instead of /æɪ/: /təˈmɐːtəʉ, vɐːz, ˈdɐːtə/, with /ˈdæɪtə/ being uncommon but acceptable;
- Zebra and leisure are pronounced /ˈzebɹə/ and /ˈleʒə/ rather than /ˈziːbɹə/ and /ˈliːʒə/, both having disyllabic laxing;
- Status varies between British-derived /ˈstæɪtəs/ with the FACE vowel and American-derived /ˈstætəs/ with the TRAP vowel;
- Conversely, precedence, precedent and derivatives are mainly pronounced with the FLEECE vowel in the stressed syllable, rather than DRESS: /ˈpɹiːsədəns ~ pɹiːˈsiːdəns, ˈpɹiːsədənt/;
- Basil is pronounced /ˈbæzəl/, rather than /ˈbæɪzəl/;
- Conversely, cache is usually pronounced /kæɪʃ/, rather than the more conventional /kæʃ/;
- Buoy is pronounced as /boɪ/ (as in boy) rather than /ˈbʉːiː/;
- The E in congress and progress is not reduced: /ˈkɔnɡɹes, ˈpɹəʉɡɹes/;
- Conversely, the unstressed O in silicon, phenomenon and python stands for a schwa: /ˈsɪlɪkən, fəˈnɔmənən, ˈpɑeθən/;
- In Amazon, Lebanon, marathon and pantheon, however, the unstressed O stands for the LOT vowel, somewhat as with American English: /ˈæməzɔn, ˈlebənɔn, ˈmæɹəθɔn, ˈpænθæɪɔn/;
- The colour name maroon is pronounced with the GOAT vowel: /məˈɹəʉn/.

== Variation ==
Variation in Australian closing diphthongs updated to match the HCE system
Phoneme	Lexical set	Phonetic realization		
Phoneme	Lexical set	Cultivated	General	Broad
/iː/	FLEECE	[ɪi]	[ɪ̈i]	[əːɪ]
/ʉː/	GOOSE	[ʊu]	[ɪ̈ɯ, ʊʉ]	[əːʉ]
/æɪ/	FACE	[ɛɪ]	[æ̠ɪ]	[æ̠ːɪ, a̠ːɪ]
/əʉ/	GOAT	[ö̞ʊ]	[æ̠ʉ]	[æ̠ːʉ, a̠ːʉ]
/ɑe/	PRICE	[a̠e]	[ɒe]	[ɒːe]
/æɔ/	MOUTH	[a̠ʊ]	[æo]	[ɛːo, ɛ̃ːɤ]

Relative to many other national dialect groupings, Australian English is relatively homogeneous across the country. Some relatively minor regional differences in pronunciation exist. A limited range of word choices is strongly regional in nature. Consequently, the geographical background of individuals may be inferred if they use words that are peculiar to particular Australian states or territories and, in some cases, even smaller regions. In addition, some Australians speak creole languages derived from Australian English, such as Australian Kriol, Torres Strait Creole and Norfuk.

Academic research has also identified notable sociocultural variation within Australian English, which is mostly evident in phonology.

=== Regional variation ===
Although Australian English is relatively homogeneous, there are some regional variations. The dialects of English spoken in the various states and territories of Australia differ slightly in vocabulary and phonology.

Most regional differences are in word usage. Swimming clothes are known as cossies, /ˈkɔziːz/ togs or swimmers in New South Wales, togs in Queensland, and bathers in Victoria, Tasmania, Western Australia and South Australia. What Queensland calls a stroller is usually called a pram in Victoria, Western Australia, South Australia, New South Wales, and Tasmania.

Preference for some synonymous words also differs between states. Garbage (i.e., garbage bin, garbage truck) dominates over rubbish in New South Wales and Queensland, while rubbish is more popular in Victoria, Tasmania, Western Australia and South Australia.

Additionally, the word footy generally refers to the most popular football code in an area; that is, rugby league or rugby union depending on the local area, in most of New South Wales and Queensland. More commonly rugby is used to distinguish rugby union from footy which refers to the more popular rugby league. Footy commonly is used for Australian rules football elsewhere however the term refers to the both prominent codes, rugby league and Australian rules football, interchangeably, depending on context of usage outside of regional perrameters. In some pockets of Melbourne & Western Sydney football and more rarely footy will refer to association football although unlike more common international terminology, Australian English uses the term soccer and not football or footy. Beer glasses are also named differently in different states. Distinctive grammatical patterns exist such as the use of the interrogative eh (also spelled ay or aye), which is particularly associated with Queensland. Secret Santa and Kris Kringle are used in all states, with the former being more common in Queensland.

South Australia

The most pronounced variation in phonology is between South Australia and the other states and territories. The trap–bath split is more complete in South Australia, in contrast to the other states. Accordingly, words such as dance, advance, plant, example and answer are pronounced with /ɐː/ (as in father) far more frequently in South Australia while the older /æ/ (as in mad) is dominant elsewhere in Australia. L-vocalisation is also more common in South Australia than other states.

Centring diphthongs

In Western Australian and Queensland English, the vowels in near and square are typically realised as centring diphthongs ([nɪə, skweə]), whereas in the other states they may also be realised as monophthongs: [nɪː, skweː].

Salary–celery merger

A feature common in Victorian English is salary–celery merger, whereby a Victorian pronunciation of Ellen may sound like Alan and Victoria's capital city Melbourne may sound like Malbourne to speakers from other states. There is also regional variation in /ʉː/ before /l/ (as in school and pool).

Full-fool allophones

In some parts of Australia, notably Victoria, a fully backed allophone of /ʉː/, transcribed [ʊː], is common before /l/. As a result, the pairs full/fool and pull/pool differ phonetically only in vowel length for those speakers. The usual allophone for /ʉː/ is further forward in Queensland and New South Wales than Victoria.

Final particle but

A final particle but, where "but" is the concluding word in a sentence, has also evolved as a distinctive feature in Australian English, particularly in Western Australia and Queensland. In conversational Australian English it is thought to be a turn-yielding particle that marks contrastive content in the utterance it closes. It is a linguistic trait sometimes employed in Australian literature to indicate that the character is quintessentially Australian.

=== Sociocultural variation ===
The General Australian accent serves as the standard variety of English across the country. According to linguists, it emerged during the 19th century. General Australian is the dominant variety across the continent, and is particularly so in urban areas. The increasing dominance of General Australian reflects its prominence on radio and television since the latter half of the 20th century.

Recent generations have seen a comparatively smaller proportion of the population speaking with the Broad sociocultural variant, which differs from General Australian in its phonology. The Broad variant is found across the continent and is relatively more prominent in rural and outer-suburban areas.

A largely historical Cultivated sociocultural variant, which adopted features of British Received Pronunciation and which was commonplace in official media during the early 20th century, had become largely extinct by the onset of the 21st century.

Australian Aboriginal English is made up of a range of forms which developed differently in different parts of Australia, and are said to vary along a continuum, from forms close to Standard Australian English to more non-standard forms. There are distinctive features of accent, grammar, words and meanings, as well as language use.

Academics have noted the emergence of numerous ethnocultural dialects of Australian English that are spoken by people from some minority non-English speaking backgrounds. These ethnocultural varieties contain features of General Australian English as adopted by the children of immigrants blended with some non-English language features, such as Afro-Asiatic languages and languages of Asia. Samoan English is also influencing Australian English. Other ethnolects include those of Lebanese and Vietnamese Australians.

A high rising terminal in Australian English was noted and studied earlier than in other varieties of English. The feature is sometimes called Australian questioning intonation. Research published in 1986, regarding vernacular speech in Sydney, suggested that high rising terminal was initially spread by young people in the 1960s. It found that the high rising terminal was used more than twice as often by young people than older people, and is more common among women than men. In the United Kingdom, it has occasionally been considered one of the variety's stereotypical features, and its spread there is attributed to the popularity of Australian soap operas.

== Vocabulary ==
=== Intrinsic traits ===
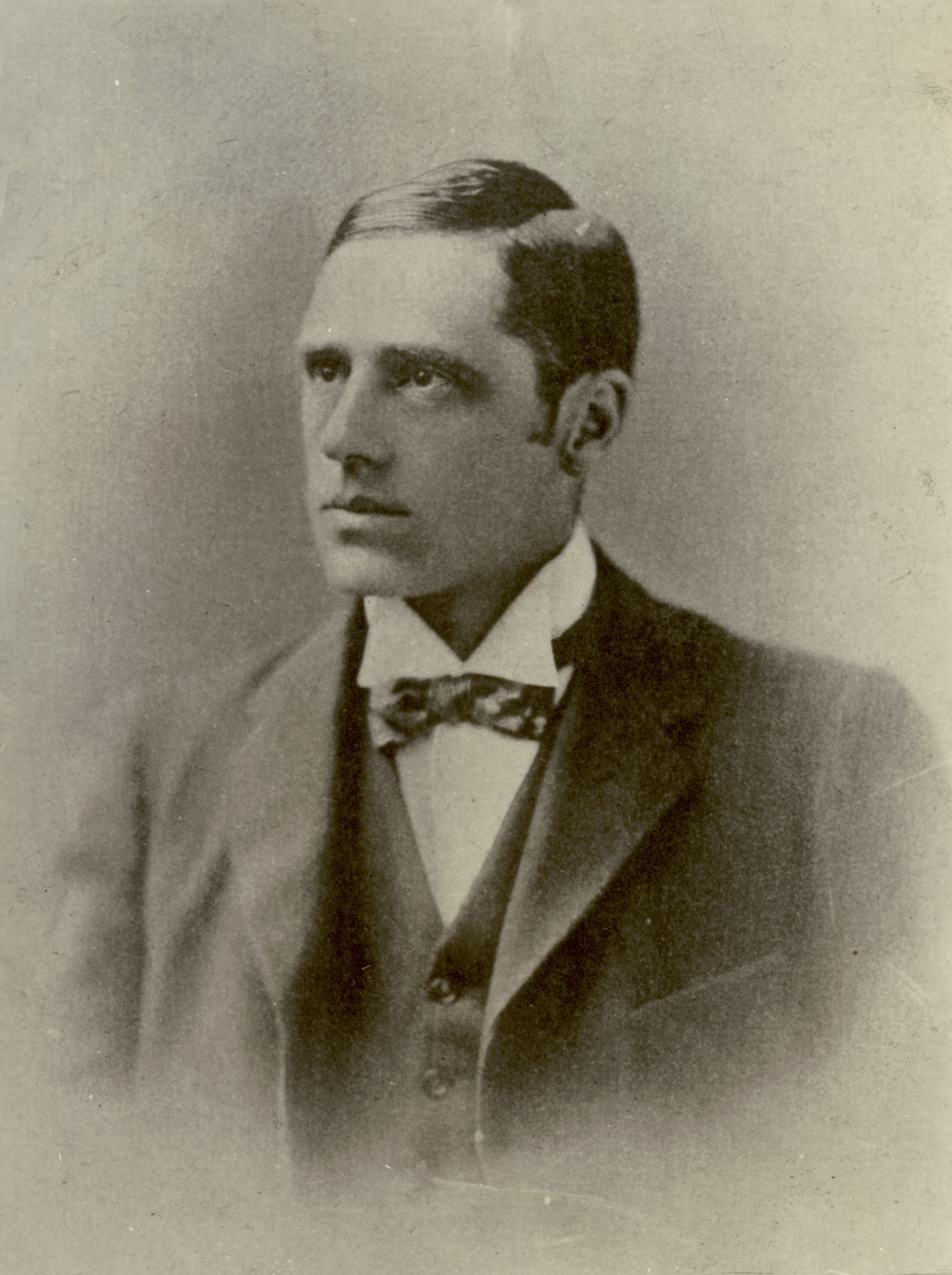
Bush poets such as Banjo Paterson captured the Australian vocabulary of the 19th century in their bush ballads.

Australian English has many words and idioms which are unique to the dialect.

==== Commonly known ====
Internationally well-known examples of Australian terminology include outback, meaning a remote, sparsely populated area, the bush, meaning either a native forest or a country area in general, and g'day, a greeting. Dinkum, or fair dinkum means "true", "legitimate" or "is that true?", among other things, depending on context and inflection. The derivative dinky-di means "true" or devoted: a "dinky-di Aussie" is a "true Australian".

==== Historical references ====
Australian poetry, such as "The Man from Snowy River", as well as folk songs such as "Waltzing Matilda", contain many historical Australian words and phrases that are understood by Australians even though some are not in common usage today.

==== British English similarities and differences ====
Australian English, in common with British English, uses the word mate to mean friend, as well as the word bloody as a mild expletive or intensifier. "Mate" is also used in multiple ways including to indicate "mateship" or formally call out the target of a threat or insult, depending on intonation and context.

Several words used by Australians were at one time used in the UK but have since fallen out of usage or changed in meaning there. For example, creek in Australia, as in North America, means a stream or small river, whereas in the UK it is typically a watercourse in a marshy area; paddock in Australia means field, whereas in the UK it means a small enclosure for livestock; bush or scrub in Australia, as in North America, means a natural, uncultivated area of vegetation or flora, whereas in England they are commonly used only in proper names (such as Shepherd's Bush and Wormwood Scrubs).

==== Aboriginal-derived words ====
Some elements of Aboriginal languages have been adopted by Australian English—mainly as names for places, flora and fauna (for example dingo) and local culture. Many such are localised, and do not form part of general Australian use, while others, such as kangaroo, boomerang, budgerigar, wallaby and so on have become international. Other examples are cooee and hard yakka. The former is used as a high-pitched call, for attracting attention, (pronounced /ˈkʉːiː/) which travels long distances. Cooee is also a notional distance: "if he's within cooee, we'll spot him". Hard yakka means "hard work" and is derived from yakka, from the Jagera/Yagara language once spoken in the Brisbane region.

The word bung, meaning "dead" was originally a Yagara word which was used in the pidgin widely spoken across Australia.

==== Places ====
Many towns or suburbs of Australia have also been influenced or named after Aboriginal words. The best-known example is the capital, Canberra, named after a local Ngunnawal language word thought to mean "women's breasts" or "meeting place".

==== Figures of speech and abbreviations ====
Litotes, such as "not bad", "not much" and "you're not wrong", are also used.

Diminutives and hypocorisms are common and are often used to indicate familiarity. Some common examples are arvo (afternoon), barbie (barbecue), smoko (cigarette break), Aussie (Australian) and Straya (Australia). This may also be done with people's names to create nicknames (other English speaking countries create similar diminutives). For example, "Gazza" from Gary, or "Smitty" from John Smith. The use of the suffix -o originates in Irish: ó, which is both a postclitic and a suffix with much the same meaning as in Australian English.

In informal speech, incomplete comparisons are sometimes used, such as "sweet as" (as in "That car is sweet as."). "Full", "fully" or "heaps" may precede a word to act as an intensifier (as in "The waves at the beach were heaps good."). This was more common in regional Australia and South Australia but has been in common usage in urban Australia for decades. The suffix "-ly" is sometimes omitted in broader Australian English. For instance, "really good" can become "real good".

==== Measures ====
Australia's switch to the metric system in the 1970s changed most of the country's vocabulary of measurement from imperial to metric measures. Since the switch to metric, heights of people are listed in centimetres on official documents and distances by road on signs are listed in terms of kilometres and metres.

=== Comparison with other varieties ===
Where British and American English vocabulary differs, sometimes Australian English shares a usage with one of those varieties, as with petrol (AmE: gasoline) and mobile phone (AmE: cellular phone) which are shared with British English, or truck (BrE: lorry - truck has a slightly different meaning) and eggplant (BrE: aubergine) which are shared with American English.

In other circumstances, Australian English sometimes favours a usage which is different from both British and American English as with:

- (the) bush (AmE and BrE: (the) woods)
- bushfire (Ame and BrE: wildfire)
- capsicum (AmE: bell pepper; BrE (green/red) pepper)
- Esky (AmE and BrE: cooler or ice box)
- doona (AmE: comforter; BrE duvet)
- footpath (AmE: sidewalk; BrE: pavement)
- ice block or icy pole (AmE: popsicle BrE: ice lolly)
- jerry lamps [used in Tasmania] (AmE and BrE: fog lights)
- lollies (AmE: candy; BrE: sweets)
- overseas (AmE and BrE: abroad)
- peak hour (Ame and BrE: rush hour)
- powerpoint (AmE: electrical outlet; BrE: electrical socket)
- thongs (AmE and BrE: flip-flops)
- ute /jʉːt/ (AmE and BrE: pickup truck)

Some examples of terminology associated with food, transport and clothing is used below to demonstrate the variations which exist between Australian English and other varieties:

Australian	American	British	Notes
Food			
capsicum	bell pepper	(red/green) pepper	
(potato) chips	French fries	(potato) chips	
chook/chicken burger	chicken (sandwich)		
coriander	cilantro	coriander	
entree	appetizer		AmE entree refers to AusE main course
eggplant		aubergine	shared with AmE
fairy floss	cotton candy	candy floss	
ice block/icy pole	popsicle	ice lolly	
jelly	Jell-o	jelly	AmE jelly refers to AusE jam
lollies	candy	sweets	
marinara (sauce)			refers to tomato based sauce in AmE, BrE, seafood sauce in AusE
mince/minced meat	ground meat	mince/minced meat	
prawn		prawn (large) shrimp (small)	BrE refers to large crustaceans only, small crustaceans referred to as shrimp. shared with AmE
snow pea		mangetout	shared with AmE
pumpkin	squash (excl. large variety)	marrow	AusE squash refers only to a small number of uncommon species
tomato sauce	ketchup	tomato sauce	shared with BrE
zucchini		courgette	shared with AmE
Transport			
aeroplane	airplane	aeroplane	shared with BrE
bonnet	hood	bonnet	shared with BrE
bumper	fender	bumper	shared with BrE
carpark	parking lot	carpark	shared with BrE
convertible		cabriolet	shared with AmE
footpath	sidewalk	pavement	
horse float	horse trailer	horsebox	
indicator	turn signal	indicator	shared with BrE
peak hour	rush hour		
petrol	gasoline	petrol	shared with BrE
railway	railroad	railway	shared with BrE
sedan (car)		saloon (car)	shared with AmE
semitrailer		artic/articulated lorry	shared with AmE
station wagon		estate car	shared with AmE
truck		lorry	shared with AmE
ute	pickup truck		
windscreen	windshield	windscreen	shared with BrE
Clothing			
gumboots	galoshes/rubber boots	Wellies/Wellington boots	
jumper	sweater	jumper	shared with BrE
nappy	diaper	nappy	shared with BrE
overalls		dungarees	shared with AmE
raincoat		mac/mackintosh	
runners/sneakers	sneakers	trainers	sneakers shared with AmE
sandshoe	tennis shoe	pump/plimsoll	
singlet	tank top	vest	
skivvy	turtleneck	polo neck	
swimmers/togs/bathers	bathing suit/swimsuit	swimming costume	
thongs	flip-flops (footwear)		thongs refer to g-string (underwear) in BrE and AmE.

==== Terms with different meanings in Australian English ====
There also exist words which in Australian English are ascribed different meanings from those ascribed in other varieties of English, for instance:

- Asian in Australian (and American) English commonly refers to people of East Asian ancestry, while in British English it commonly refers to people of South Asian ancestry
- Biscuit in Australian (and British) English refers to AmE cookie and cracker, while in American English it refers to a leavened bread product
- (potato) Chips refers both to British English crisps (which is not commonly used in Australian English) and to American English French fries (which is used alongside hot chips)
- Football in Australian English most commonly refers to Australian rules football, rugby league or rugby union. In British English, football is most commonly used to refer to association football, while in North American English football is used to refer to gridiron
- Pants in Australian (and American) English most commonly refers to British English trousers, but in British English refers to Australian English underpants
- Nursery in Australian English generally refers to a plant nursery, whereas in British English and American English it also often refers to a child care or daycare for pre-school age children
- Paddock in Australian English refers to an open field or meadow whereas in American and British English it refers to a small agricultural enclosure
- Premier in Australian English refers specifically to the head of government of an Australian state, whereas in British English it is used interchangeably with Prime Minister
- Public school in Australian (and American) English refers to a state school. Australian and American English use private school to mean a non-government or independent school, while British English uses private school for the same concept, public schools are a subset of private schools
- Pudding in Australian (and American) English refers to a particular sweet dessert dish, while in British English can also refer to dessert (the food course) in general
- Thongs in Australian English refer to British and American English flip-flop (footwear), whereas in both American and British English it refers to Australian English G-string (underwear) (in Australian English the singular "thong" can refer to one half of a pair of the footwear or to a G-string, so care must be taken as to context)
- Vest in Australian (and American) English refers to a padded upper garment or British English waistcoat but in British English vest refers to Australian English singlet - an obsolete term in British English

==== Idioms taking different forms in Australian English ====
In addition to the large number of uniquely Australian idioms in common use, there are instances of idioms taking different forms in Australian English than in other varieties, for instance:

- A drop in the ocean (shared with BrE usage) as opposed to AmE a drop in the bucket
- A way to go (shared with BrE usage) as opposed to AmE a ways to go
- Home away from home (shared with AmE usage) as opposed to BrE home from home
- Take (something) with a grain of salt (shared with AmE usage) as opposed to BrE take with a pinch of salt
- Touch wood (shared with BrE usage) as opposed to AmE knock on wood
- Wouldn't touch (something) with a ten-foot pole (shared with AmE usage) as opposed to BrE wouldn't touch with a barge pole

==== British and American English terms not commonly used in Australian English ====
There are extensive terms used in other varieties of English which are not widely used in Australian English. These terms usually do not result in Australian English speakers failing to comprehend speakers of other varieties of English, as Australian English speakers will often be familiar with such terms through exposure to media or may ascertain the meaning using context.

Non-exhaustive selections of British English and American English terms not commonly used in Australian English together with their definitions or Australian English equivalents are found in the collapsible table below:

British English terms not widely used in Australian English

- Allotment (gardening): A community garden not connected to a dwelling
- Artic or articulated lorry (vehicle): Australian English semi-trailer
- Aubergine (vegetable): Australian English eggplant
- Bank holiday: Australian English public holiday
- Barmy: Crazy, mad or insane.
- Bedsit: Australian English studio (apartment)
- Belisha beacon: A flashing light atop a pole used to mark a pedestrian crossing
- Bin lorry: Australian English: rubbish truck or garbage truck
- Bobby: A police officer, particularly one of lower rank
- Cagoule: A lightweight raincoat or windsheeter
- Candy floss (confectionery): Australian English fairy floss
- Cash machine: Australian English automatic teller machine
- Chav: Lower socio-economic person comparable to Australian English bogan
- Child-minder: Australian English babysitter
- Chivvy: To hurry (somebody) along. Australian English nag
- Chrimbo: Abbreviation for Christmas comparable to Australian English Chrissy
- Chuffed: To be proud (especially of oneself)
- Cleg (insect): Australian English horsefly
- Clingfilm: A plastic wrap used in food preparation. Australian English Glad wrap/cling wrap
- Community payback: Australian English community service
- Comprehensive school: Australian English state school or public school
- Cooker: A kitchen appliance. Australian English stove and/or oven
- Coppice: An area of cleared woodland
- Council housing: Australian English public housing
- Counterpane: A bed covering. Australian English bedspread (bedspread is also used in the UK)
- Courgette: A vegetable. Australian English zucchini
- Creche: Australian English child care centre
- (potato) Crisps: Australian English (potato) chips
- Current account: Australian English transaction account
- Dell: A small secluded hollow or valley
- Do (informal): Australian English party or social gathering
- Doddle (slang): An easy task
- Doss (verb): To spend time idly
- Drawing pin: Australian English thumb tack
- Dungarees: Australian English overalls
- Dustbin: Australian English garbage bin/rubbish bin
- Dustcart or bin lorry: Australian English garbage truck/rubbish truck
- Duvet: Australian English doona
- Elastoplast or plaster: An adhesive used to cover small wounds. Australian English band-aid
- Electrical lead: Australian English electrical cord
- Estate car: Australian English station wagon
- Fairy cake: Australian English cupcake
- Father Christmas: Australian English Santa Claus
- Fen: A low and frequently flooded area of land, similar to Australian English swamp
- Free phone: Australian English toll-free
- Gammon: Meat from the hind leg of pork. Australian English makes no distinction between gammon and ham
- Git: A foolish person. Equivalent to idiot or moron
- Goose pimples: Australian English goose bumps
- Hacked off: To be irritated or upset, often with a person
- Hairgrip: Australian English hairpin or bobbypin
- Half-term: Australian English school holiday
- Haulier: Australian English hauler
- Heath: An area of dry grass or shrubs, similar to Australian English shrubland
- Hoover (verb): Australian English to vacuum
- Horsebox: Australian English horse float
- Ice lolly: Australian English ice block or icy pole
- Kip: To sleep
- Kitchen roll: Australian English paper towel
- Landslip: Australian English landslide
- Lavatory: Australian English toilet (lavatory is used in Australian English for toilets on aeroplanes)
- Lido: A public swimming pool
- Lorry: Australian English truck
- Loudhailer: Australian English megaphone
- Mackintosh or mac: Australian English raincoat
- Mangetout: Australian English snow pea
- Marrow: Australian English squash
- Minidish: A satellite dish for domestic (especially television) use
- Moggie: A domestic short-haired cat
- Nettled: Irritated (especially with somebody)
- Nosh: A meal or spread of food
- Off-licence: Australian English bottle shop/Bottle-o
- Pak choi: Australian English bok choy
- Pavement: Australian English footpath
- Pelican crossing: Australian English pedestrian crossing or zebra crossing
- Peaky: Unwell or sickly
- (red or green) Pepper (vegetable): Australian English capsicum
- People carrier (vehicle): Australian English people mover
- Pillar box: Australian English post box
- Pillock: A mildly offensive term for a foolish or obnoxious person, similar to idiot or moron. Also refers to male genitalia
- Plimsoll (footwear): Australian English sandshoe
- Pneumatic drill: Australian English jackhammer
- Polo neck (garment): Australian English skivvy
- Poorly: Unwell or sick
- Press-up (exercise): Australian English push-up
- Pushchair: A wheeled cart for pushing a baby. Australian English stroller or pram
- Pusher: A wheeled cart for pushing a baby. Australian English stroller or pram
- Rodgering: A mildly offensive term for sexual intercourse, similar to Australian English rooting
- Saloon (car): Australian English sedan
- Scratchings (food): Solid material left after rendering animal (especially pork) fat. Australian English crackling
- Sellotape (genericised trademark): Australian English sticky tape
- Shan't: Australian English will not
- Skive (verb): To play truant, particularly from an educational institution. Australian English to wag
- Sleeping policeman: Australian English speed hump or speed bump (though both these terms are also widely used in the UK)
- Snog (verb) (dated): To kiss passionately, equivalent to Australian English pash
- Sod: A mildly offensive term for an unpleasant person
- Spinney: A small area of trees and bushes
- Strimmer: Australian English whipper snipper or line trimmer
- Swan (verb): To move from one plact to another ostentatiously
- Sweets: Australian English lollies
- Tailback: A long queue of stationary or slow-moving traffic
- Tangerine: Australian English mandarin (but see tangerine for the various definitions of this fruit)
- Tat (noun): Cheap, tasteless goods
- Tipp-Ex (genericised trademark): Australian English white out or liquid paper
- Trainers: Athletic footwear. Australian English runners or sneakers
- Turning (noun): Where one road branches from another. Australian English turn
- Utility room: A room containing washing or other home appliances, similar to Australian English laundry
- Value-added tax (VAT): Australian English equivalent goods and services tax (GST)
- Wellington boots: Australian English gumboots although gumboots is a dated UK English word for the same thing
- White spirit (turpentine substitute): Australian English turpentine

American English terms not widely used in Australian English

- Acclimate: Australian English acclimatise
- Airplane: Australian English aeroplane
- Aluminum: Australian English aluminium
- Baby carriage: Australian English stroller or pram
- Bangs: A hairstyle. Australian English fringe
- Baseboard (architecture): Australian English skirting board
- Bayou: Australian English swamp/billabong
- Bell pepper: Australian English capsicum
- Bellhop: Australian English hotel porter
- Beltway: Australian English ring road
- Boondocks: An isolated, rural area. Australian English the sticks or Woop Woop or Beyond the black stump
- Broil (cooking technique): Australian English grill
- Bullhorn: Australian English megaphone
- Burglarize: Australian English burgle
- Busboy: A subclass of (restaurant) waiter
- Candy: Australian English lollies
- Cellular phone: Australian English mobile phone
- Cilantro: Australian English coriander
- Comforter: Australian English doona
- Condominium: Australian English apartment
- Counter-clockwise: Australian English anticlockwise
- Coveralls: Australian English overalls
- Crapshoot: A risky venture
- Diaper: Australian English nappy
- Downtown: Australian English central business district
- Drapes: Australian English curtains
- Drugstore: Australian English pharmacy or chemist
- Drywall: Australian English plasterboard
- Dumpster: Australian English skip bin
- Fall (season): Australian English autumn
- Fanny pack: Australian English bum bag
- Faucet: Australian English tap
- Flashlight: Australian English torch
- Freshman: A first year student at a highschool or university
- Frosting (cookery): Australian English icing
- Gasoline: Australian English petrol
- Gas pedal: Australian English accelerator
- Gas Station: Australian English service station or petrol station
- Glove compartment: Australian English glovebox
- Golden raisin: Australian English sultana
- Grifter: Australian English con artist
- Ground beef: Australian English minced beef or mince
- Hood (vehicle): Australian English bonnet
- Hot tub: Australian English spa or spa bath
- Jell-o: Australian English jelly
- Ladybug: Australian English ladybird
- Mail-man: Australian English postman or postie
- Mass transit: Australian English public transport
- Math: Australian English maths
- Mineral spirits: Australian English turpentine
- Nightstand: Australian English bedside table
- Out-of-state: Australian English interstate
- Pacifier: Australian English dummy
- Parking lot: Australian English car park
- Penitentiary: Australian English prison or jail
- Period (punctuation): Australian English full stop
- Play hooky (verb): To play truant from an educational institution. Equivalent to Australian English (to) wag
- Popsicle: Australian English ice block or icy pole
- Railroad: Australian English railway
- Railroad ties: Australian English Railway sleepers
- Rappel: Australian English abseil
- Realtor: Australian English real estate agent
- Root (sport): To enthusiastically support a sporting team. Equivalent to Australian English barrack
- Row house: Australian English terrace house
- Sales tax: Australian English goods and services tax (GST)
- Saran wrap: Australian English plastic wrap or cling wrap
- Scad: Australian English a large quantity
- Scallion: Australian English spring onion
- Sharpie (pen): Australian English permanent marker or texta or felt pen
- Shopping cart: Australian English shopping trolley
- Sidewalk: Australian English footpath
- Silverware or flatware: Australian English cutlery
- Soda pop: Australian English soft drink
- Streetcar: Australian English tram
- Sweater: Australian English jumper
- Sweatpants: Australian English tracksuit pants/trackies
- Tailpipe: Australian English exhaust pipe
- Takeout: Australian English takeaway
- Trash can: Australian English garbage bin or rubbish bin
- Trunk (vehicle): Australian English boot
- Turn signal: Australian English indicator
- Turtleneck: Australian English skivvy
- Upscale and downscale: Australian English upmarket and downmarket
- Vacation: Australian English holiday
- Windshield: Australian English windscreen

=== Influence on other languages and dialects ===
Australian English has influenced several other varieties of English, particularly in Oceania, and other languages spoken in Australia and Oceania.

==== New Caledonia ====
Australian English has been a heavy source of vocabulary for both English and French (plus in turn local languages) in New Caledonia, with a large amount of Australianised Anglicisms being present in New Caledonian speech. For example, the Australian agricultural terms paddock, run, station, stock, stockman, stockwhip and stockyard are all used in New Caledonia.

== Grammar ==
The general rules which apply to Australian English are described at English grammar. Grammatical differences between varieties of English are minor relative to differences in phonology and vocabulary and do not generally affect intelligibility. Examples of grammatical differences between Australian English and other varieties include:

- Collective nouns are generally singular in construction, i.e., the group was leaving as opposed to the group were leaving. This is in common with American English.
- Australian English has an extreme distaste for the modal verbs shall (in non-legal contexts), shan't and ought (in place of will, won't and should respectively), which are encountered in British English. However, shall is found in the Australian Constitution, Acts of Parliament, and other formal or legal documents such as contracts, and ought sees use in some academic contexts (such as philosophy).
- Using should with the same meaning as would, e.g. I should like to see you, encountered in British English, is almost never encountered in Australian English.
- River follows the name of the river in question, i.e., the Brisbane River, not the River Brisbane. However, there are exceptions: the official names of the Derwent and Torrens rivers (in Tasmania and South Australia, respectively) are River Derwent and River Torrens. In South Australian English, the name of the Murray River is also reversed.
- While prepositions before days may be omitted in American English, i.e., She resigned Thursday, they are retained in Australian English: She resigned on Thursday. This is shared with British English.
- The institutional nouns hospital and university do not take the definite article, i.e., She's in hospital, and He's at university. This is in contrast to American English where the is required, i.e., In the hospital, and At the university.
- On the weekend is used in favour of the British at the weekend which is not encountered in Australian English.
- Ranges of dates use to, i.e., Monday to Friday, rather than Monday through Friday. This is shared with British English and is in contrast to American English. The hybrid form Monday through to Friday is sometimes used.
- When speaking or writing out numbers, and is always inserted before the tens, i.e., one hundred and sixty-two rather than one hundred sixty-two. This is in contrast to American English, where the insertion of and is acceptable but nonetheless either casual or informal.
- The preposition to in write to (e.g. "I'll write to you") is always retained, as opposed to American usage where it may be dropped.
- Australian English does not share the British usage of the verb read to mean "study at degree level". Therefore, it may be said that "He is studying medicine" but not that "He is reading medicine".
- When referring to time, Australians will refer to 10:30 as half past ten and do not use the (optional and informal) British half ten. Similarly, a quarter to ten is used for 9:45 rather than (a) quarter of ten, which is sometimes found in American English.
- To have a shower or have a bath are the most common usages in Australian English, in contrast to American English which uses take a shower and take a bath.
- The past participle of saw (to cut with a saw) is sawn (e.g. sawn-off shotgun) in Australian English, in contrast to the American English sawed.
- The verb visit is transitive in Australian English. Where the object is a person or people, American English also uses visit with, which is not found in Australian English.
- An outdoor event which is cancelled due to inclement weather is rained out in Australian English. This is in contrast to British English where it is said to be rained off.
- In informal speech, sentence-final but may be used, e.g. "I don't want to go but" in place of "But I don't want to go". This is also found in Scottish English, and some northern English English dialects.
- In informal speech, the discourse markers yeah no (or yeah nah) and no yeah (or nah yeah) may be used to mean "no" and "yes" respectively. Extended discourse markers of this nature are sometimes used for comedic effect, but the meaning is generally found in the final affirmative/negative.

== Spelling and style ==
As in other English-speaking countries, there is no central authority that prescribes official usage with respect to matters of spelling, grammar, punctuation or style.

=== Spelling ===
There are several dictionaries of Australian English which adopt a descriptive approach. The Macquarie Dictionary and the Australian Oxford Dictionary are most commonly used by universities, governments and courts as the standard for Australian English spelling.

Australian spelling is significantly closer to British compared with American spelling, as it did not adopt the systematic reforms promulgated in Noah Webster's 1828 Dictionary. Notwithstanding, the Macquarie Dictionary often lists most American spellings as acceptable secondary variants.

The minor systematic differences which occur between Australian and American spelling are summarised below:

- French-derived words which in American English end with or, such as color, honor, behavior and labor, are spelt with our in Australian English: colour, honour, behaviour and labour. Exceptions are the Australian Labor Party and some (especially South Australian) place names which use harbor, notably Victor Harbor.
- Words which in American English end with ize, such as realize, recognize and apologize are spelt with ise in Australian English: realise, recognise and apologise. The British Oxford spelling, which uses the ize endings, remains a minority variant. The Macquarie Dictionary says that the -ise form as opposed to -ize sits at 3:1. The sole exception to this is capsize, which is used in all varieties.
- Words which in American English end with yze, such as analyze, paralyze and catalyze are spelt with yse in Australian English: analyse, paralyse and catalyse.
- French-derived words which in American English end with er, such as fiber, center and meter are spelled with re in Australian English: fibre, centre and metre (the unit of measurement only, not physical devices; so gasometer, voltmeter).
- A double-consonant l is retained in Australian English when adding suffixes to words ending in l where the consonant is unstressed, contrary to American English. Therefore, Australian English favours cancelled, counsellor and travelling over American English canceled, counselor and traveling.
- Where American English uses a double-consonant ll in the words skillful, willful, enroll, distill, enthrall, fulfill and installment, Australian English uses a single consonant: skilful, wilful, enrol, distil, enthral, fulfil and instalment. However, the Macquarie Dictionary has noted a growing tendency to use the double consonant.
- The American English defense and offense are spelt defence and offence in Australian English.
- In contrast with American English, which uses practice and license for both nouns and verbs, practice and licence are nouns while practise and license are verbs in Australian English.
- Words with ae and oe are often maintained in words such as oestrogen and paedophilia, in contrast to the American English practice of using e alone (as in estrogen and pedophilia). The Macquarie Dictionary has noted a shift within Australian English towards using e alone in several words, such as encyclopedia, fetus, hematite, medieval, fetid on with the e spelling as the preferred variant and hence Australian English varies by word when it comes to these sets of words.

Minor systematic difference which occur between Australian and British spelling are as follows:

- Words often ending in eable in British English end in able in Australian English. Therefore, Australian English favours livable over liveable, sizable over sizeable, movable over moveable, etc., although both variants are acceptable.
- Words often ending in eing in British English end in ing in Australian English. Therefore, Australian English favours aging over ageing, or routing over routeing, etc., although both variants are acceptable.
- Words often ending in mme in British English end in m in Australian English. Therefore, Australian English favours program over programme (in all contexts) and aerogram over aerogramme, although both variants are acceptable. Similar to Canada, New Zealand and the United States, (kilo)gram is the only spelling.

Other examples of individual words where the preferred spelling is listed by the Macquarie Dictionary as being different from current British spellings include analog as opposed to analogue, guerilla as opposed to guerrilla, verandah as opposed to veranda, burqa as opposed to burka, pastie (noun) as opposed to pasty, neuron as opposed to neurone, hiccup as opposed to hiccough, annex as opposed to annexe, raccoon as opposed to racoon etc. Unspaced forms such as onto, anytime, alright and anymore are also listed as being equally as acceptable as their spaced counterparts. Additionally, the spellings donut and percent as opposed to doughnut and per cent have become more common than their counterparts; however, the official Australian style manual considers percent to be a misspelling.

There is variation between and within varieties of English in the treatment of -t and -ed endings for past tense verbs. The Macquarie Dictionary does not favour either, but it suggests that leaped, leaned or learned (with -ed endings) are more common but spelt and burnt (with -t endings) are more common.

Different spellings have existed throughout Australia's history. What are today regarded as American spellings were popular in Australia throughout the late 19th and early 20th centuries, with the Victorian Department of Education endorsing them into the 1970s and The Age newspaper until the 1990s. This influence can be seen in the spelling of the Australian Labor Party and also in some place names such as Victor Harbor. The Concise Oxford English Dictionary has been credited with re-establishing the dominance of the British spellings in the 1920s and 1930s. For a short time during the late 20th century, Harry Lindgren's 1969 spelling reform proposal (Spelling Reform 1 or SR1) gained some support in Australia and was adopted by the Australian Teachers' Federation and minister Doug Everingham in personal correspondence.

=== Punctuation and style ===
A prominent style guide for the Government of Australia is the Australian Government Style Manual. It is a comprehensive guide that includes usage guides on grammar, punctuation, and conventions for government writers and editors.

To indicate speech, both single and double inverted comma quotation marks are used. Generally, double quotation marks are preferred for use in the first instance, with single quotation marks used for quotes within quotes. However, the opposite is true in the government and corporate sectors, where double quotation marks are reserved for quotes within quotes. The punctuation mark used to end a sentence is called a full stop; a period usually refers to menstruation or an interval of time.

The DD/MM/YYYY date format is followed and the 12-hour clock is generally used in everyday life (the 24-hour clock is used by the military and police, and for transport timetables).

The country has used the metric system since the 1970s, though the imperial system is still sometimes used informally, especially among older Australians, in idioms (e.g. to "go the extra mile", not "go the extra kilometre") and in reference to a person's height.

In betting, decimal odds are used in preference to fractional odds, as used in the United Kingdom, or moneyline odds in the United States.

=== Keyboard layout ===
There are two major English language keyboard layouts, the United States layout and the United Kingdom layout. Keyboards and keyboard software for the Australian market universally uses the US keyboard layout, which lacks the pound (£), euro and negation symbols and uses a different layout for punctuation symbols from the UK keyboard layout.

== Demographics ==
=== By ancestry ===
Percentage of people from different ancestries that speak English (2021)
Nationality	Percentage	
Nationality	Native (Note: Percentage of people who speak English at home.)	Fluent (Note: Percentage of people who speak another language at home who are fluent in English.)
(Afghanistan) Afghan	<4.0%	68.6%
(United States) American	89.4%	93.2%
(Argentina) Argentinian	20.2%	92.6%
(Austria) Austrian	63.9%	95.1%
(Bangladesh) Bangladeshi	6.8%	93.5%
(Bosnia and Herzegovina) Bosnian	11.7%	75.8%
(Brazil) Brazilian	15.1%	93.9%
(United Kingdom) British	97.3%	>99.0%
(Myanmar) Burmese	11.6%	57.0%
(Cambodia) Cambodian	8.7%	56.4%
(Canada) Canadian	88.1%	95.9%
(Chile) Chilean	19.0%	85.6%
(China) Chinese	3.4%	66.1%
(Colombia) Colombian	10.7%	90.5%
(Croatia) Croatian	23.8%	78.5%
(Cyprus) Cypriot	17.3%	76.3%
(Netherlands) Dutch	71.2%	96.1%
(Timor-Leste) East Timorese	15.1%	67.2%
(Egypt) Egyptian	21.6%	89.2%
(Ethiopia) Ethiopian	12.1%	84.4%
(Fiji) Fijian	25.8%	95.2%
(Philippines) Filipino	25.0%	96.8%
(France) French	34.1%	96.9%
(Germany) German	59.5%	96.1%
(Greece) Greek	10.8%	65.1%
Hong Kong	15.3%	86.5%
(Hungary) Hungarian	41.8%	89.2%
(India) Indian	13.4%	94.7%
(Indonesia) Indonesian	20.7%	89.6%
(Iran) Iranian	8.2%	85.5%
(Iraq) Iraqi	<5.0%	67.0%
(Republic of Ireland) Irish	94.8%	90.0%
(Israel) Israeli	33.1%	96.5%
(Italy) Italian	25.8%	78.9%
(Japan) Japanese	20.3%	85.2%
(Kenya) Kenyan	35.5%	96.3%
(Laos) Lao	13.5%	61.2%
(Lebanon) Lebanese	10.5%	76.8%
(North Macedonia) Macedonian	11.1%	73.5%
(Malaysia) Malaysian	32.8%	86.4%
(Malta) Maltese	49.0%	87.8%
(Mauritius) Mauritian	28.5%	96.5%
(Mexico) Mexican	18.2%	96.6%
(Nepal) Nepali	3.1%	96.1%
New Zealand	89.1%	91.5%
(Pakistan) Pakistani	7.7%	92.9%
(Palestine) Palestinian	14.2%	80.8%
(Papua New Guinea) Papua New Guinean	76.9%	93.8%
(Peru) Peruvian	21.8%	93.5%
(Poland) Polish	28.8%	87.8%
(Portugal) Portuguese	28.1%	75.9%
(Romania) Romanian	27.1%	88.5%
(Russia) Russian	18.6%	86.1%
(Samoa) Samoan	16.9%	88.0%
(Saudi Arabia) Saudi Arabian	16.2%	92.2%
(Serbia) Serbian	15.6%	81.2%
(Singapore) Singaporean	54.5%	96.4%
(Somalia) Somali	6.5%	79.1%
(South Africa) South African	73.6%	98.1%
(South Korea) South Korean	10.3%	70.3%
(South Sudan) South Sudanese	7.5%	86.5%
(Spain) Spanish	29.0%	86.4%
(Sri Lanka) Sri Lankan	21.8%	93.5%
(Sudan) Sudanese	10.2%	83.5%
(Sweden) Swedish	44.9%	98.3%
(Syria) Syrian	3.2%	65.9%
(Taiwan) Taiwanese	7.5%	73.7%
(Thailand) Thai	21.0%	78.3%
(Tonga) Tongan	15.4%	81.0%
(Turkey) Turkish	12.1%	69.1%
(Ukraine) Ukrainian	19.2%	82.9%
(Venezuela) Venezuelan	13.7%	93.9%
(Vietnam) Vietnamese	5.2%	58.7%
(Zimbabwe) Zimbabwean	61.7%	98.4%

== See also ==
- The Australian National Dictionary
- Australian English vocabulary
- New Zealand English
- South African English
- Zimbabwean English
- Falkland Islands English
- Commonwealth English
- Diminutives in Australian English
- Sound correspondences between English accents
- Strine
