= Lamidi =

Nigerian given name

- Gender: Male
- Language: Yoruba

Origin
- Origin: Nigeria
- Meaning: The Yorùbá version of El-Hameed.
- Region of origin: South West, Nigeria

Lamidi is a Nigerian male given name and surname of Yoruba origin. It is the Yorùbá version of El-Hameed.

Notable individuals with the name include:

- Lamidi Adeyemi III (15 October 1938 – 22 April 2022), Oyo traditional ruler
- Lamidi Olonade Fakeye (1925 – December 25, 2009), Nigerian sculptor and academic
- Lamidi Adeosun (born 22 August 1963), retired Nigerian Army lieutenant general
- Lamidi Adedibu (24 October 1927 – 11 June 2008), aristocratic power broker in Oyo State, Nigeria
- Tayo Lamidi (Mufutau Tèmítáyọ̀ Lamidi; born February 4, 1965), Nigerian academic
