= Venezuelan Australians =

Venezuelan Australians Venezolano-Australiano
- (Venezuela) (Australia)

Total population
- 6,627 (by ancestry, 2021)

Regions with significant populations
- New South Wales: 1,629
- Victoria: 1,123
- Queensland: 1,109

Languages
- Australian English · Venezuelan Spanish · Arabic · Italian · Portuguese

Religion
- Predominately Roman Catholic · Protestant

Related ethnic groups
- Italians · Spaniards · Portuguese · South Americans • Colombian Australians • Brazilian Australians

Venezuelan Australians (Spanish: venezolanos australiano) refers to Australian citizens of Venezuelan descent or birth. According to the 2021 Census there were 6,627 Venezuelan-born citizens who were residing in Australia at the moment of the census. There are an estimated 10,000 Australians of Venezuelan ancestry according to a study of Ivan De La Vega from Simón Bolívar University.

Almost 76% of Venezuelan Australians are concentrated in Eastern Australia.

== History and cultural background ==
Small numbers of Venezuela-born have migrated to Australia since the 1960s, but the majority, about 72.9% of the population, arrived in Australia after 2001 as a part of the brain drain of the Venezuelan diaspora. Most came as skilled migrants, because of uncertainty of economic conditions in Venezuela.

=== Ancestry ===
According to the 2011 census, 42.1% of Venezuelans reported to have Venezuelan ancestry, 13.9% Venezuelans reported to have Spanish Venezuelan ancestry, 8.1% of Venezuelans reported to have Italo-Venezuelan ancestry, 3.4% of Venezuelans reported to have English Venezuelan ancestry and 32.4% of Venezuelans reported to have other ancestries, including Portuguese Venezuelan.

=== Education and professions ===
83.7% of Venezuelan Australians over 15 years of age had a form of higher non-school qualifications. 57.6% had an occupation that was either being a skilled managerl, professional or in trade.

=== Language ===
The main language spoken at home by Venezuela-born people is Spanish in a 77.7% followed by English with 13.8%. With a difference to others Hispanic Australian diasporas that speaks mainly Romance languages and English languages, an important percent of Venezuelan-born people main language spoken at home is Arabic in 2.6%. The remaining 6% speak others language at home (2% of them speak Italian, and at least 1% of them speak(s) Portuguese).

== See also ==
- Demographics of Australia
- Demographics of Venezuela
- European Australians
- Europeans in Oceania
- Hispanic and Latin American Australians
- Immigration to Australia
