= Bloody =

Expletive intensifier

Bloody, as an adjective or adverb, is an expletive attributive commonly used in British, Irish, Australian and New Zealand English. It is also used in Canada, India, Hawaii, Kenya, Malaysia, New Caledonia (in both English and French), Singapore, South Africa, Zimbabwe and a number of other Commonwealth nations. It has been used as an intensive since at least the 1670s.

== Origin ==
Use of the adjective bloody as a profane intensifier predates the 18th century. Its ultimate origin is unclear, and several hypotheses have been suggested. It may be a direct loan of Dutch bloote, (modern spelling blote) meaning naked, bare or uncovered, which was suggested by Ker (1837) to have been "transformed into bloody, in the consequently absurd phrases of bloody good, bloody bad, bloody thief, bloody angry, etc., where it simply implies completely, entirely, purely, very, truly, and has no relation to either blood or murder, except by corruption of the word."

The word "blood" in Dutch and German is used as part of minced oaths, in abbreviation of expressions referring to "God's blood", i.e. the Passion or the Eucharist. Ernest Weekley (1921) relates English usage to imitation of purely intensive use of Dutch bloed and German Blut in the early modern period.

Although the word "bloody" has Germanic origins, its use as a swear word most likely entered English from the French, or, more specifically, the Anglo Norman language, the dialect of French spoken in England after the Norman Conquest of 1066. According to Emily Reed (2018), "sanglant" (meaning "bloody") was used as an expletive in Anglo Norman, with published examples dating back to 1396. In that year, two examples of such insults appeared in Manières de langage, a medieval textbook for French-language learners. Subsequent publications (the French farce Pathelin and the Chronique de Charles VII) indicate that the word was commonly used as an insult in the Norman dialect of French spoken in England.

The Oxford English Dictionary mentions the theory that it may have arisen from aristocratic rowdies known as "bloods", hence "bloody drunk" means "drunk as a blood".

== History of use ==
Bloody was used as an intensifier by 18th-century authors Henry Fielding and Jonathan Swift ("It was bloody hot walking today" in 1713) and Samuel Richardson ("He is bloody passionate" in 1742).

After about 1750 the word assumed more profane connotations. Johnson (1755) called it "very vulgar", and the original Oxford English Dictionary article of 1888 comments the word is "now constantly in the mouths of the lowest classes, but by respectable people considered 'a horrid word', on a par with obscene or profane language".

On the opening night of George Bernard Shaw's comedy Pygmalion in 1914, Mrs Patrick Campbell, in the role of Eliza Doolittle, created a sensation with the line "Walk! Not bloody likely!" and this led to a fad for using "Pygmalion" itself as a pseudo-oath, as in "Not Pygmalion likely".

== Usage outside the UK ==
=== Australia/New Zealand ===
In 2007, an Australian advertising campaign So where the bloody hell are you? was banned on UK televisions and billboards as the term was still considered an expletive. The term's usage in Australian and New Zealand English has resulted in the term also being used in New Caledonia, where it also takes the form of the New Caledonian French word blady (an eye dialect of "bloody" in Australian or New Zealand English).

== In composition ==
The King James Version of the Bible uses bloody literally, as in "bloody crimes" (Ezekiel 22:2), "Woe to the bloody city" (Ezekiel 24:6, Nahum 3:1). "bloody men" (26:9, Psalms 59:2, 139:19), etc. The expression of "bloody murder" goes back to at least Elizabethan English, as in Shakespeare's Titus Andronicus (c. 1591), "bloody murder or detested rape".

The expression "scream bloody murder," in the figurative or desemanticised sense of "to loudly object to something" attested since c. 1860, is now considered American English, while in British English, the euphemistic "blue murder" had replaced "bloody murder" during the period of "bloody" being considered taboo.

In March 2006, Australia's national tourism commission, Tourism Australia, launched an advertising campaign targeted at potential visitors in several English-speaking countries. The ad sparked controversy because of its ending (in which a cheerful, bikini-clad spokeswoman delivers the ad's call-to-action by saying "...so where the bloody hell are you?"). In the UK the BACC required that a modified version of the ad be shown in the United Kingdom, without the word "bloody".

In May 2006, the UK's Advertising Standards Authority ruled that the word bloody was not an inappropriate marketing tool and the original version of the ad was permitted to air. In Canada, the ad's use of "bloody hell" also created controversy.

The longer "bloody hell-hounds" appears to have been at least printable in early 19th century Britain. "Bloody hell's flames" as well as "bloody hell" is reported as a profanity supposedly used by Catholics against Protestants in 1845.
