= Harry Lindgren =

Australian mathematician and linguist (1912–1992)

- Born: 25 June 1912; Newcastle upon Tyne, England
- Died: 1 July 1992 (aged 80); Jindalee Nursing Home, Canberra, Australia
- Education: University of Western Australia (BSc)
- Occupations: Engineer, linguist, amateur mathematician
- Known for: Spelling Reform 1
- Spouse: Eve Spokone (m. 1941)
- Children: 1

Harry Lindgren (25 June 1912 – 1 July 1992) was a British-Australian engineer, linguist and amateur mathematician.

== Early life ==
Lindgren was born in Newcastle-upon-Tyne in England.

In 1935 he emigrated to join his family in Perth, Australia. He received a BSc degree from the University of Western Australia and later became a Commonwealth Patent Officer. He married Eve Spokone, whom he had met at university, on 30 May 1941, the couple went on to have one daughter. Lindgren played violin in the Canberra Symphony Orchestra for a number of years.

== Mathematics ==
Lindgren published articles in several mathematical journals which culminated in his famous book 'Geometric Dissections' (Van Nostrand 1964), which explores techniques for devising and solving dissection puzzles. When published, his work was the only complete treatment of this subject in any language. This remained true for a third of a century.

== Linguistics and later life ==
In 1969, Lindgren published Spelling Reform: A New Approach (Alpha Books, 104 Bathurst St, Sydney 2000, Australia). This work outlines a proposal for introducing phoneme-by-phoneme adjustment of English spelling, in order that spellings may more accurately represent the sounds of the speech they denote. The book features several cartoons illustrating the absurdities of existing spellings. He spent five years writing the book.

On 1 September 1971, Lindgren launched the Spelling Action Society (headquartered in Narrabundah, a suburb of Canberra) to promote his suggested reforms. He chose the name to share its initials with Scandinavia's SAS airline to acknowledge his Nordic ancestry. He published the newsletter Spelling Action under the society to promote use of his Spelling Reform step One (SR1). As Lindgren's health deteriorated in later life the newsletter was taken over by Gary Jimmieson (and later Doug Everingham).

He died of a pulmonary embolism in Jindalee Nursing Home, Canberra.
