= Japanese settlement in New Caledonia =

Total population
- 8,000 (2008) (Note: Figure includes all New Caledonians of Japanese ancestry, including those of mixed heritage.)

Regions with significant populations
- Nouméa

Languages
- French, Japanese

Related ethnic groups
- Japanese, Okinawan

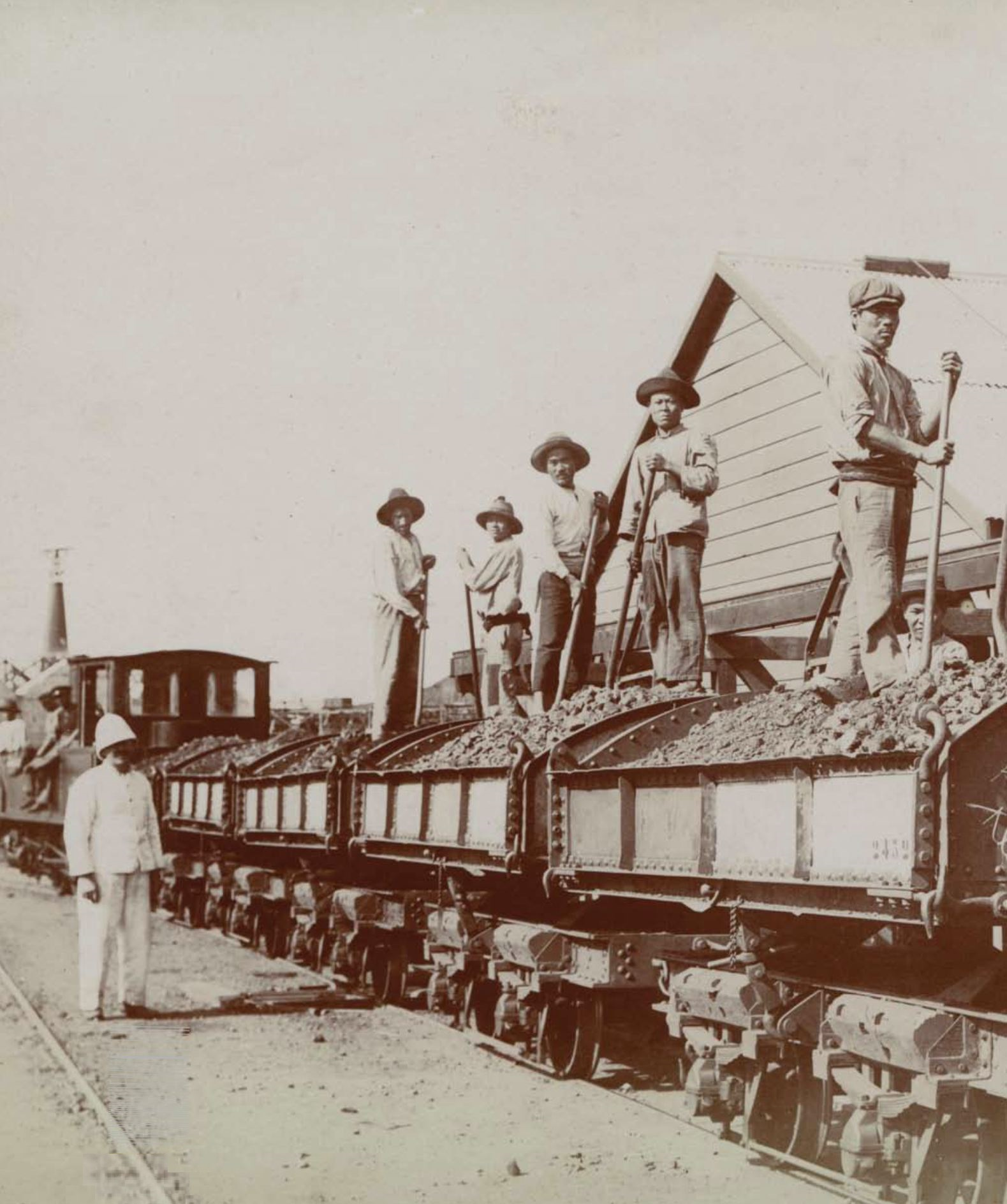
Miners on a train in Thio, New Caledonia.

Japanese settlement in New Caledonia dates back to the 19th century when male indentured labourers were brought to the island and worked in the nickel mines. Some of whom settled down in New Caledonia, and often intermarried with women of other ethnicities. After the Second World War, most of the island's Japanese were repatriated back to Japan, although a small minority remained behind.

== History ==
The first Japanese who arrived on New Caledonia consisted of 600 Japanese labourers who were contracted to work at a nickel mine at Thio in January 1892. Another 500 Japanese were brought to New Caledonia the following year to meet with the growing world demand for nickel. Japanese miners frequently reported of tough working conditions and the majority returned to Japan upon the expiration of their contracts, and took up long-term or permanent residence in New Caledonia. The colonial government stopped the inflow of Japanese miners in 1919 as the demand for nickel from New Caledonia declined. Most Japanese settlers lived around Nouméa, and established commercial farms while the rest became retail traders. Japanese influence in the commercial retail sectors increased in the 1920s and 1930s, which was supported by the presence of Japanese businesses that had invested in the island's iron and nickel ores. Some Japanese also came to settle in New Caledonia during this period, although they faced tightening immigration rules as Western suspicion of Japan's militarism intensified. In the late 1930s, Japanese enterprises in New Caledonia came under Australian clandestine surveillance, although they faced little restrictions in most commercial activities. Japanese residents in New Caledonia were relocated to internment camps in Australia after the Attack on Pearl Harbor in December 1941. After the war, the Japanese populace in the islands were repatriated, although a small resident population remained behind.

== Demographics ==
Official statistics showed some 6,880 Japanese miners that landed in New Caledonia between 1892 and 1919. The Japanese community had almost 3,000 individuals in 1922, and many left New Caledonia in the 1920s and 1930s as ethnic suspicion against ethnic Japanese intensified. Within the Japanese community, Okinawans consisted a sizeable minority, and a 1905 census recorded some 387 Okinawans in New Caledonia. In all official census until the 1940s, Japanese were classified as "Europeans" and enjoyed similar rights with other European settlers. Inter-ethnic unions between Japanese men and women were frequent, although some Japanese settlers married Japanese women. A 1940 report showed some 36 men that married Japanese women, while another 20 married French women. Another 107 married or cohabited with Kanak, Vietnamese or Javanese women. In the same year, there were some 200 second-generation Japanese settlers, of which three quarters were born to one non-Japanese parent, while the remainder were of pure Japanese descent.

Year	Population
1918	2,458
1937	1,239
1946	97

== Education ==
École japonaise de la Nouvelle-Calédonie (ニューカレドニア日本語補習校 Nyū Karedonia Nihongo Hoshūkō), a weekend supplementary Japanese education programme, is located in Noumea. Classes are held at the Ecole Sacré-Cœur, and it is operated by the Association Japonaise en Nouvelle-Calédonie (ニューカレドニア日本人会 Nyū Karedonia Nihonjinkai).

== Bibliography ==
- Burchett, William G., Pacific Treasure Island: New Caledonia: Voyage Through its Land and Wealth, The Story of its People and Past, F.W. Cheshire, 1942
- Crocombe, R. G., Asia in the Pacific Islands: Replacing the West, 2007, ISBN 982-02-0388-0
- Crocombe, R. G., The South Pacific, University of the South Pacific, 2001, ISBN 982-02-0154-3
- Howard, Michael C., The Political Economy of the South Pacific: An Introduction–Issue 13 of South East Asian Monograph Series, James Cook University of North Queensland, 1983, ISBN 0-86443-073-6
- Moore, Clive; Leckie, Jacqueline; Munro, Doug, Labour in the South Pacific, James Cook University of Northern Queensland, 1990
- Thomas, Martin, The French Empire Between the Wars: Imperialism, Politics and Society Studies in Imperialism, Manchester University Press, 2005, ISBN 0-7190-6518-6
- Wurm, Stephen Adolphe; Mühlhäusler, Peter; Tryon, Darrell T., Atlas of Languages of Intercultural Communication in the Pacific, Asia, and the Americas, Walter de Gruyter, 1996, ISBN 3-11-013417-9
- Weiner, Michael, Japan's Minorities: The Illusion of Homogeneity, Sheffield Centre for Japanese Studies/Routledge Series, Routledge, 1997, ISBN 0-415-15218-6
