= Saint-Louis, New Caledonia =

Coordinates: 22.226°S 166.557°E

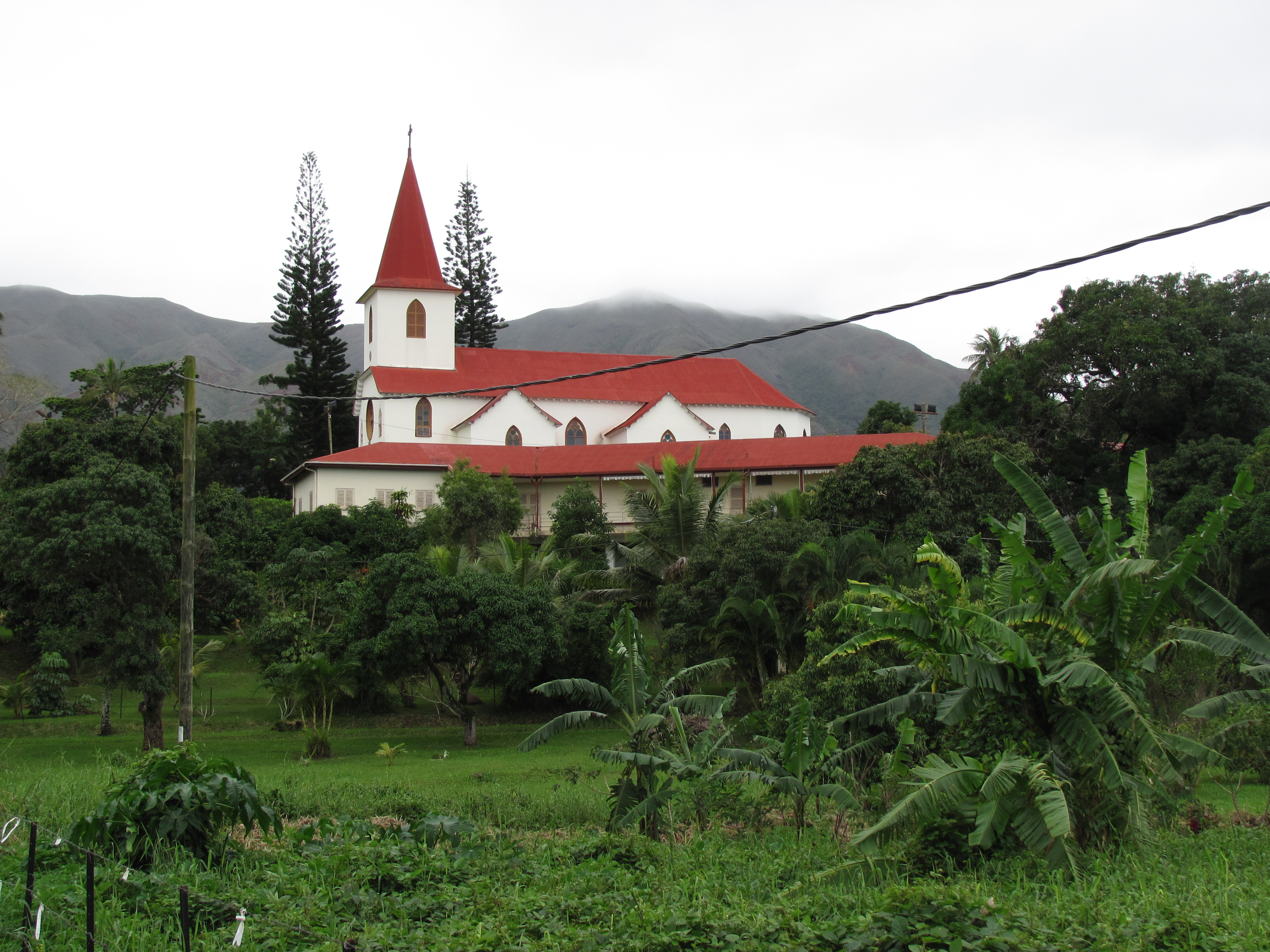
Catholic church in Saint Louis, Le Mont-Dore, New Caledonia

Saint-Louis is a part of the village Le Mont-Dore. It is located in the extended territory of Nouméa, in New Caledonia.

Tayo Creole is the primary language spoken in Saint-Louis.

Saint-Louis is well known for numerous violent incidents among Melanesians and Wallisians since 2002.
