= Tayo Creole =

French-based Creole spoken in New Caledonia

Tayo
- Patois de Saint-Louis
- Native to: New Caledonia
- Native speakers: 900 (2009 census)
- Language family: French Creole: Pacific; Tayo

Language codes
- ISO 639-3: cks
- Glottolog: tayo1238
- ELP: DE
- New Caledonia

Tayo, also known as Saint-Louis Patois (French: patois de Saint-Louis), is a French-based creole primarily spoken on the outskirts of Nouméa, the capital city of New Caledonia. It is spoken by about 3,000 people in the village of Saint-Louis, about 15 km (9.3 mi) from Nouméa. The language developed out of the contact of speakers of many different Kanak languages in the mission, and the use of French for official purposes and as the language of prestige. The language contains structural elements primarily from Melanesian languages and lexical elements mainly from French.

== History ==
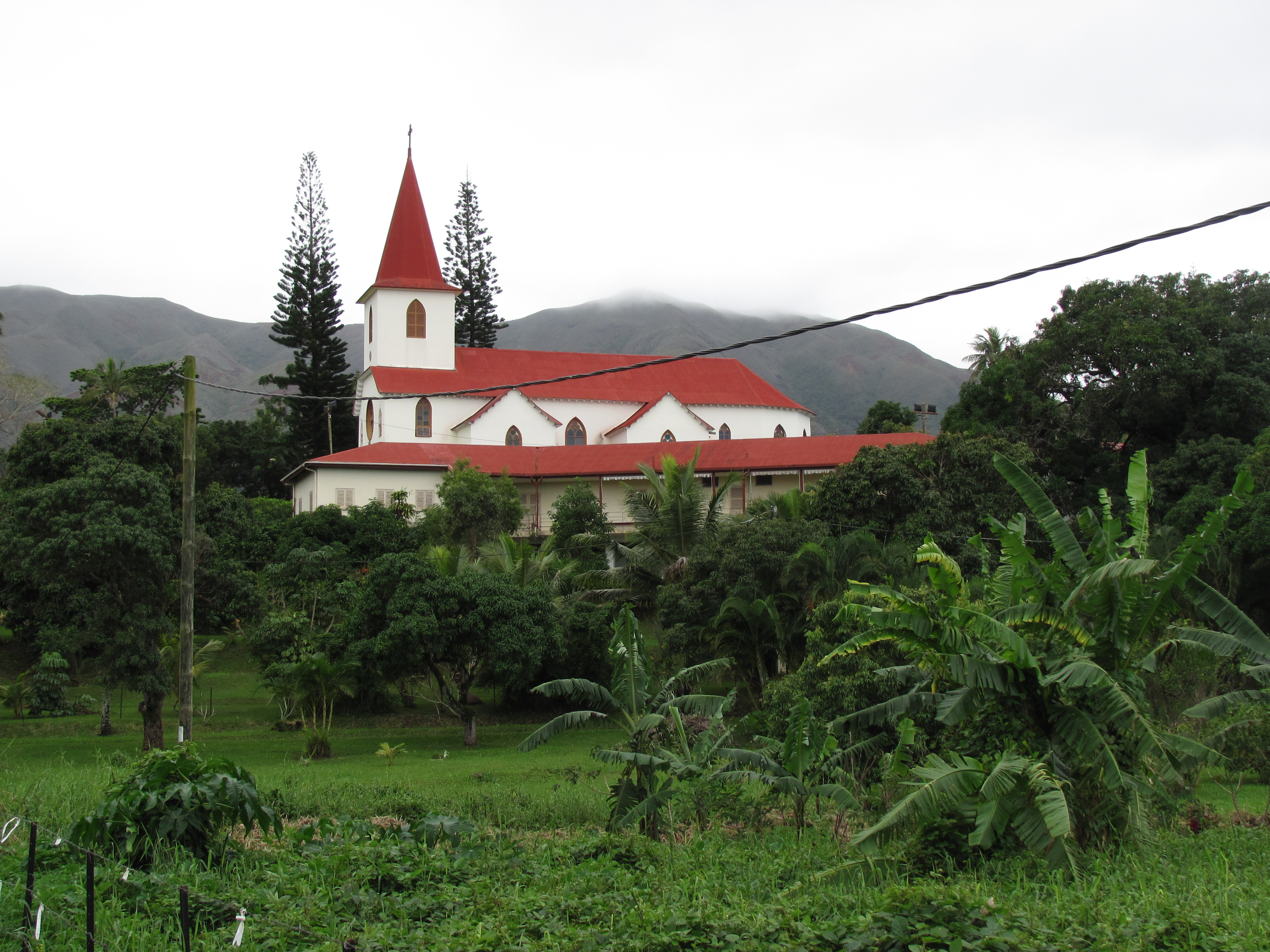
A church in Saint-Louis, New Caledonia

Saint-Louis was founded as a Marist mission in 1860 in the early French colonial period of the island, in order to convert the native Kanak population to Christianity and a European way of life. The missionaries took converts from surrounding Kanak tribes, especially the Cèmuhi, Drubea and Xârâcuu to live in the mission. Saint-Louis therefore became a highly multilingual society with a diverse range of Kanak languages as well as French. In order for different ethnic groups to communicate and also because French was the language imposed by the missionaries, a simplified French became the language of communication and the native language of the next generation, which developed into Tayo Creole, mixing French vocabulary with mainly Melanesian language structures.

=== The Role of the Girls' Mission School ===
The girls school in Saint-Louis has been widely considered instrumental in creating the conditions for the formation of Tayo, especially by Speedy (2013). There, Kanak girls were schooled in standard French, and Kanak languages were forbidden, although in practice girls used many linguistic resources to communicate such as code-switching, translation and the use of interlanguages. These communicative practices resulted in a form of French with Melanesian structures. Men and boys meanwhile had less exposure to French working in the field. When the girls married husbands from the community their language had greater prestige than Kanak languages, thanks to the ideology of the missionaries. Therefore, despite the societal multilingualism that had been the norm in New Caledonia at the time, in which children would learn the different native languages of their mother and father, couples communicated with each other and their children primarily in simplified French and this became the first language of the next generation, as Tayo Creole.

=== The impact of Reunion Creole ===
There has been a debate among linguists as to the impact of Reunion Creole in the formation of Tayo. Chaudenson proposed that Tayo was actually a ‘second generation’ creole, directly descended from the creole language of Reunionese migrants. He based this claim on phonological, lexical and grammatical similarities between the languages and the fact that some Reunionese had settled near Saint-Louis. Ehrhart and Corne refuted this claim, arguing that Tayo contains mainly Kanak structures. Speedy agrees that Tayo is largely structurally Melanesian, although she also argues that Reunion Creole was a type of French that interacted in the formation of Tayo.

== Phonology ==
Tayo Consonant Phonemes
	Bilabial	Labiodental	Alveolar	Post-alveolar	Palatal	Velar
Voiceless stop	/p/		/t/			/k/
Voiced (prenasalised) stop	/ᵐb/		/^{n}d/			/^{ŋ}g/
Voiceless fricative		/f/	/s/	/ʃ/		(/x/) (Note: Ehrhart and Revis (2013) note that the phoneme /x/ is marginal and only appears in some words of Melanesian origin. Voiced consonants and affricates are prenasalised, except in final position in which they are released as only nasals.)
Voiced fricative		/v/				
Affricate				/^{n}dʒ/		
Nasal	/m/		/n/		/ɲ/	ŋ
Approximant	/w/ (Note: /w/ is labio-velar, and so is shown in both the bilabial and velar columns.)		/l/, /r/		/j/	/w/

Tayo Vowel Phonemes
	Front	Central	Back
High	/i/		/u/
Mid	/e/		/o/, /oː/ (Note: The two long vowels, /a:/ and /o:/ developed from French nasal vowels /ɑ̃/ and /ɔ̃/)
Low		/a/, /aː/	

== Grammar ==
=== Nouns ===
Tayo nouns do not display much internal morphology, with some number and definiteness information encoded in modifiers and clitics outside of the noun.

==== Pluralisation ====
Tayo nouns can be pluralised with the modifier tule, which can be contracted to tle or te. This is placed before the noun as shown in example (a):

(a) tule laser-la le travaj

PL nun-the/this SI work

“The/these nuns work”

==== Determiner/Demonstrative ====
Another nominal modifier is the clitic -la which can optionally follow nouns to introduce something new or to point to something within reach. This modifier, also present in New Caledonian French, occurs frequently, especially with English loanwords and monosyllabic words. This is demonstrated in example (b):

(b) ma uver kapoa-la

I open tin-the/this

“I open the/this tin”

==== Possession ====
Possession is denoted with the preposition pu, placed after the possessed and before the possessor. This is shown in example (c):

(c) fij pu ʃef

daughter PREP chief

“The chief’s daughter”

=== Personal Pronouns ===
Personal Pronouns in Tayo
Person and Number	Dependent Pronoun / Subject Index	Independent Pronoun
1st Person Singular	ma	mwa
2nd Person Singular	te	twa
3rd Person Singular	la, le (Note: Ehrhart and Revis describe le as a 3rd person marker for both 3rd person singular and plural based on their analysis of data from the 1980s and 1990s. However, they admit that modern Tayo uses le for all persons, often announcing a subject to come.)	lie, (Note: While speakers recognise lie as the more correct form for the 3rd person singular independent pronoun, their most common pronunciation is lje.) lje
1st Person Dual	nu^{n}de	nu^{n}de
2nd Person Dual	vu^{n}de	vu^{n}de
3rd Person Dual	le^{n}de	le^{n}de
1st Person Plural	nu	nu
2nd Person Plural	uso	uso
3rd Person Plural	sa, sola, lesot, le	sola, lesot

Personal pronouns are divided into two categories, characterised by Ehrhart and Revis (2013) as dependent pronouns and independent pronouns. The dependent pronouns denote the subject of a clause, and the independent pronouns denote a range of functions including the object, emphatic subject, reflexive subject or possessor. In the dual and 1st and 2nd person plural, both types of pronoun have the same form. Example (d) below shows the dependent pronoun sa in subject position and the independent pronoun mwa as a direct object. Meanwhile, example (e) shows the independent pronoun lja as an indirect object, as it is after the preposition ave.

(d) sa wa mwa

they see me

“They see me”

(e) nu tro aːᵐbete ave lja depi taler

we too annoyed with him/her since just.now

“We too are annoyed with him since just now”

Independent pronouns can also function as emphatic subjects. In these cases, the dependent pronoun functions like a clitic, characterised by Ehrart and Revis (2013) as a subject index. This is shown in example (f):

(f) mwa ma malad

I I (SI) sick

“I (emphatic) am sick”

A final use for independent pronouns is in possessive constructions. These are identical to how possession is expressed with nouns, with the independent pronoun placed after the possessive preposition pu, as shown in example (g):

(g) kas pu mwa

house PREP me

“My house” (Ehrhart & Revis 2013)

=== Verbs ===
==== Tense, Aspect and Modality ====
Tense and aspect, and modality are encoded in markers preceding the verb, as shown in the table below:

Tense and Aspect in Tayo
Marker	Function	Examples
No marker	Present, Near Future, Past	Ta ekri ka? you write what “What are you writing”
ete (Note: Ehrhart and Revis (2013) note that although past tense can be expressed with no marker, ete is more frequent among the youth and in more formal contexts.)	Past	On ete bja arive pukwa? we PAST well arrive why “Why did we arrive well?”
va	Future, Irrealis	Wala ^{n}depresjola-la va tape nu FOC depression-the/this will hit us “And see, this tropical depression will hit us”
atra ^{n}de	Progressive	Ta atra ^{n}de fe kwa? you PROG do what “What are you doing at the moment?”
fini, ^{n}dʒa	Completive	Ma fini/^{n}dʒa reste noumea I COMPL live Nouméa “I used to live in Nouméa”

Modality Markers in Tayo
Marker	Function	Examples
ule	desire	… me person le ule done… but nobody SI want give “... But nobody wanted to give…”
fo	obligation	fo ale vit OBLIG go fast “You have to go fast”
ako	obligation, repetition	ma ako ale o ʃa I OBLIG go to field “I still have to go to the field”
mwaja (^{n}de)	ability	no, ma pa mwaja vja NEG I NEG ABL come “No, I can’t come”
kone	ability	ta kone parle tajo you ABL speak Tayo “You can speak Tayo”
^{m}beswa ^{n}de	necessity	napa ᵐbeswa ^{n}de ^{n}di no pu lja NEG NECESSITY say name POSS him/her “We don’t have to say his name”
ke	assertive, emphasis on action	la ke fe ^{n}dusma he/she EMPH make slowly “He really works slowly”

==== Negation ====
The particle pa is placed before the verb to express negation, in contrast to the French source word pas, which follows the verb. This is shown in example (h):

(h) ma pa ule

I NEG want

“I do not like to”

==== Imperatives ====
Imperative verbs are formed with an unmodified verb base, as in example (i):

(i) ^{n}desa ^{n}de lao, twa

come.down from up you

“Come down from up there, you!”

==== Causatives ====
The marker fe is said before a verb to denote a causative action, as in example (j):

(j) la fe plan ver-la

s/he make full glass-the/this

“He filled the glass”

=== Questions ===
Polar questions are formed the same way like a statement, but with rising intonation, like is often done in spoken French. This is shown in example (k):

(k) ta kone ke se mama pu lja?

you know that PRESV mother POSS him/her

“Do you know that she is his/her mother?”

Content questions likewise are phrased like statements, except with an interrogative pronoun in place of a noun phrase, shown in example (l):

(l) ta war ki?

you see who

“Who did you see?”

==== Structural Formation ====
Siegel's (2008) analysis of tense, mood and aspect marking in Kanak substrate languages and Tayo Creole supports the theory that structural features from substrate languages (i.e. in this case, the Kanak languages) are mostly likely to transfer into the creole when they are shared by most of the substrate languages, and the lexifier language (i.e. in this case, French). For example, future tense was marked in two out of three languages analysed as a pre-verbal tense marker. French also frequently express future tense using the verb aller (‘go’), as a pre-verbal marker. As this verb is most often realised in the 3rd person singular form va, this form was transferred into Tayo Creole as the future tense marker. Likewise, progressive aspect marking occurs in all three languages, and French uses the phrase en train de with a similar function in pre-verbal position. As such, atra ^{n}de was transferred into the creole language as a pre-verbal progressive marker.

== Sociolinguistic situation ==
Tayo is in a diglossic relationship with French, with French having higher prestige and used in institutions such as education and in jobs, and Tayo mainly relegated to private homes. Tayo is often denigrated as ‘bad French’, with a Tayo speaking woman stating that as a child she was forbidden from speaking Tayo. A survey conducted by Bissonauth & Parish found that out of eight respondents who reported understanding Tayo, only three reported using it regularly.

In a 2015 study by the University of Technology Sydney (UTS), all three respondents (a male senator aged over 60, a female student aged under 20 and a female museum community liaison officer in her 40s) who reported speaking Tayo were also multilingual (with all three also speaking Drehu and French, and the two women also speaking English). The three respondents all lived in the South Province, being from La Conception, Saint-Louis and Yaté.
