= Melanesian languages =

Obsolete term for Austronesian languages of Melanesia

In linguistics, Melanesian is an obsolete term referring to the Austronesian languages of Melanesia: that is, the Oceanic, Eastern Malayo-Polynesian, or Central–Eastern Malayo-Polynesian languages apart from Polynesian and Micronesian. A typical classification of the Austronesian languages ca. 1970 would divide them into something like the following branches:

- Formosan languages (Northern)
- Western Malayo-Polynesian
- Eastern Malayo-Polynesian
  - Melanesian languages (including Fijian)
  - Micronesian languages
  - Polynesian languages

== Phylogenetic affiliations ==
It is now known that the Melanesian languages do not form a genealogical node: they are at best paraphyletic, and very likely polyphyletic; like Papuan, the term is now used as one of convenience, and sometimes placed in scare quotes. Although the term was at least in the beginning partially racial rather than linguistic, the Melanesian and other Central–Eastern Malayo-Polynesian languages are typologically similar, due to being the Austronesian languages most heavily restructured under the influence of various Papuan language families.

In terms of phylogenetic affiliation, “Melanesian languages” thus refer to a heterogenous set of language families:

- some Austronesian languages, more precisely:
  - the South Halmahera–West New Guinea branch of CEMP.
  - several branches of the Oceanic languages: Admiralties; Yapese; St Matthias; Western Oceanic; Temotu; Southeast Solomons; Southern Oceanic; plus, the languages of Fiji, i.e. all the Central Pacific languages except Polynesian.
- all non-Austronesian languages of the region, i.e. Papuan languages (themselves a heterogenous set)

== Languages of Melanesia ==
Most of the languages of Melanesia are members of the Austronesian language family or one of the many Papuan families. By one count, there are 1,319 languages in Melanesia, scattered across a small amount of land. The proportion of 716 sq. kilometers per language is by far the most dense rate of languages in relation to land mass in the earth, almost three times as dense as in Nigeria, a country famous for its high number of languages in a compact area.

In addition to this large number of indigenous languages, there are also a number of pidgins and creoles. Most notable among these are Tok Pisin, Hiri Motu, Solomon Islands Pijin, Bislama, and Papuan Malay.
