= Tayo Lamidi =

Nigerian academic (born 1965)

- Born: Mufutau Tèmítáyọ̀ Lamidi; 4 February 1965; Iresi, Boluwaduro, Osun State, Nigeria
- Education: University of Ibadan
- Occupations: Professor of English, University of Ibadan
- Spouse: Idayyah Lamidi
- Writing career
- Notable works: Aspects of Chomskyan Grammar; Introduction to English Grammar and Composition

Tayo Lamidi (named Mufutau Tèmítáyọ̀ Lamidi; born February 4, 1965) is a Nigerian academic. He is the professor of Generative Syntax and Contact Linguistics at the Department of English, University of Ibadan. He is one of Nigeria's notable generative syntacticians.

== Early life ==
Lamidi attended Methodist High School, Ilesa, Osun State, where he graduated in 1982. He then enrolled in Osun State College of Arts and Science, Ile-Ife, where he had HSC in Yoruba, Literature and Christian Religious Studies in 1985. He earned Bachelors, Masters and PhD degrees at the Department of English, University of Ibadan in 1991, 1997 and 2003, respectively.

== Career ==
His lecturing career began in May, 1997 as a graduate assistant. He rose to become a professor in October, 2011. He was a part-time lecturer at Olabisi Onabanjo University, Ago Iwoye and visiting lecturer at Niger Delta University, Wilberforce Island. Between August 2016 and July 2017, he was a visiting scholar at the University of Ghana, Legon, Accra, Ghana.

He is a member of the American Studies Association of Nigeria, the English Scholars Association of Nigeria (formerly Nigeria English Studies Association) and the West African Linguistic Society. He served as an external examiner for postgraduate researches at the Njala University, Sierra Leone and the Obafemi Awolowo University, Ile-Ife, Nigeria.

== Publications ==
Lamidi's publications appeared in journals and books. Among them are the Research in African Languages and Linguistics, California Linguistic Notes, Journal of Language and Translation, Languages in Contrast, Suvremena Lingvistica, Studia Anglica Posnaniensia, Opanbata LASU Journal of African Studies, Papers in English Linguistics and the Journal of the Linguistic Association of Nigeria.

Others are the Southeast Asian Journal of English Language Studies, Nordic Journal of African Studies, Poznań Studies in Contemporary Linguistics, Castalia: A Journal of Multicultural and Multidisciplinary Studies, IHAFA: A Journal of African Studies, Language, Literature and Communication: A Multidisciplinary Journal of the Arts, Ibadan Journal of Humanities, the Ibadan Journal of English Studies, the Journal of the Nigeria English Studies Association (JNESA) and the Journal of Language and Culture.

He is the author of Aspects of Chomskyan Grammar and Introduction to English Grammar and Composition. He edited Effective Communication and Writing Skills: A Textbook for GES 201: Use of English II and English Grammar and Usage: a Textbook for GES 101: Use of English 1.

== Administrative experience ==
Lamidi is a member of the University of Ibadan Senate.

He was a Local Organising Committee Member for West Africa Linguistic Society Conference in 2004 and 2013 and that of the Faculty Biennial International Conference in 2011 and 2013. He served as Staff Adviser of Association of Students of English, UI.

== Personal life ==
He is a member of the University of Ibadan Muslim Community and Editorial Adviser to Adh-Dhiikr Magazine, a publication of the Muslim Students' Society of Nigeria, University of Ibadan (MSSNUI).
