= Australia–Latin America relations =

Australia

Latin America

Australia–Latin America relations are relations between Australia and the countries of Latin America.

== History ==
=== Pre-21st century ===
The 1605 voyage of Pedro Fernandes de Queirós from Peru almost reached the Australian coast, which would have potentially resulted in the Spanish Empire acquiring Australia along with much of Latin America.

The 1788 British First Fleet stopped in Rio de Janeiro on the way to Australia. In general, maritime connections between Oceania and Latin America retained a certain relevance until the 1914 completion of the Panama Canal.

=== 21st century ===
Latin America's economic growth has attracted Australian commercial interest, with Brazil's growth being of particular note. The goods trade between Australia and Latin America has gone from A$1.3 billion in 1990 to A$8.5 billion in 2012; analysts have identified the two entities' location in the Pacific Rim as positioning them to also benefit from economic dynamism in East Asia. As part of this geographic linkage, Australia and New Zealand have also pursued integration into Latin America's Pacific Alliance.

== Cultural relations ==
A greater appreciation of Latin American culture has emerged in Australia, with Latin American influences in the United States also filtering through to Australia. The growing Latin American diaspora in Australia has played a role as well.

=== Sports ===
Australia has limited connections with Latin America through sport. However, Australia's success in hosting the 2000 Olympics resulted in its sports technicians and expertise being sought out to help in preparing for Rio 2016.

Baseball5, which is based on Latin American street games, has been introduced into many Australian schools. Cuba and Australia have signed an agreement to foster cooperation in developing ties in baseball and Baseball5.

== Australia's foreign relations with Latin American countries ==
- Argentina–Australia relations
- Australia–Bolivia relations
- Australia–Brazil relations
- Australia–Chile relations
- Australia–Colombia relations
- Australia–Costa Rica relations
- Australia–Cuba relations
- Australia–Dominican Republic relations
- Australia–Ecuador relations
- Australia–El Salvador relations
- Australia–Guatemala relations
- Australia–Honduras relations
- Australia–Mexico relations
- Australia–Nicaragua relations
- Australia–Panama relations
- Australia–Paraguay relations
- Australia–Peru relations
- Australia–Uruguay relations
- Australia–Venezuela relations
