= Uruguayan Australians =

Ethnic group in Australia

Uruguayan Australians Uruguayo-australiano
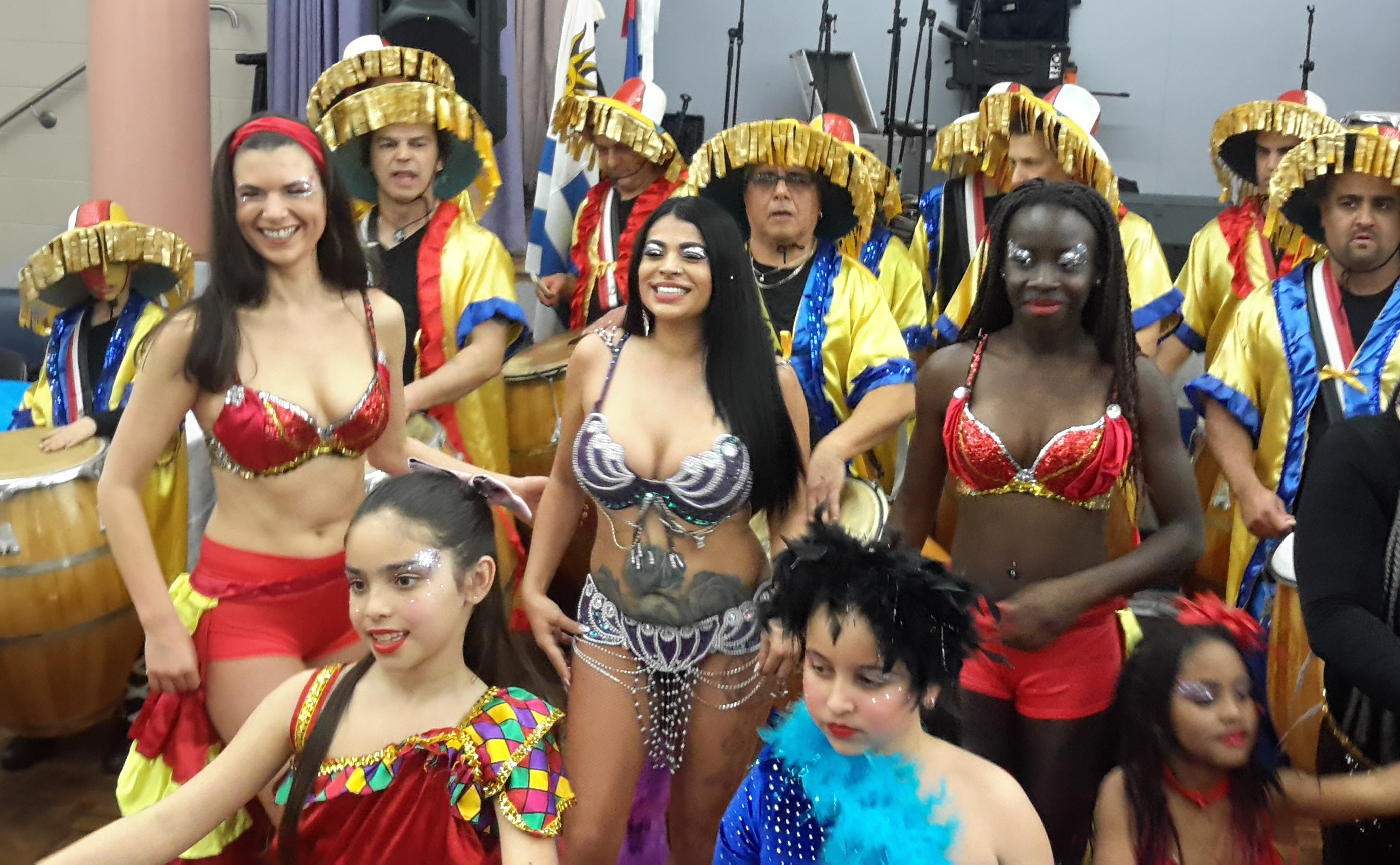
- Candombe performance in Sydney

Total population
- 6,485 (by ancestry, 2006); 9,376 (by birth, 2006).

Regions with significant populations
- Uruguayan born by state or territory
- New South Wales: 6,516
- Victoria: 1,615

Languages
- Australian English; Uruguayan Spanish; Italian

Religion
- Roman Catholic (Predominantly); Protestant

Related ethnic groups
- Spaniards; Italians; French; Basques; Portuguese; White Hispanics

Uruguayan Australians (Spanish: uruguayos australiano) refers to Australians of Uruguayan ancestry or birth who reside in Australia.

According to the 2006 Australian census, 9,376 Australians were born in Uruguay while 6,485 claimed Uruguayan ancestry, either alone or with another ancestry.

== History ==
The first migrants from Uruguay came to Australia in the 1960s with growing numbers in the 1970s due to military dictatorship.

== Uruguayan Australians ==
- Alex Brosque, football (soccer) player
- Anthony Cáceres, football player for Sydney FC
- Nick Carle, football (soccer) player
- Alberto Domínguez, cyclist and radio presenter. Victim of the September 11 attacks
- Bruno Fornaroli, football (soccer) player for Melbourne Victory FC
- Richard Garcia, football (soccer) coach and former player
- Telmo Languiller, politician
- Alex de Minaur, tennis player
- Richard Porta, football (soccer) player
- Blake Ricciuto, football player for Tanjong Pagar United FC
- Carmen Novoa, Author, writer, painter, and poet

== See also ==
- Australia–Uruguay relations
- Argentine Australians
- Brazilian Australians
- Chilean Australians
- Colombian Australians
- European Australians
- Europeans in Oceania
- Hispanic and Latin American Australians
- Immigration to Australia
- Venezuelan Australians
- White Hispanics
