= Colombian Australians =

- (Colombia) (Australia)

Total population
- Colombian; 35,021 (by birth, 2021); 32,194 (by ancestry, 2021)

Regions with significant populations
- Sydney; Melbourne

Languages
- Australian English, Colombian Spanish

Religion
- Predominately Roman Catholic

Related ethnic groups
- Latin American Australians, Spaniards, Mestizos, Afro-Colombians, Colombian people

Colombian Australians (Spanish: colomboaustralianos) are Australians who trace their nationality or heritage from the South American nation of Colombia. A rapidly growing migrant group, they form the largest Latin American-born population and the third-largest Latin American ancestry group (after Chileans and Brazilians) in Australia.

== History ==
Immigrants from Colombia to Australia were first recorded in the census of 1911, which counted four people of Colombian origin.

In the 1990s, a number of migrants from Latin American countries began arriving in Australia. These arrivals generally came to Australia on student visas, and were from the middle class. The Colombian-born population of Australia increased from 2,113 at the 1991 census to 11,317 by 2011, an increase of more than 500 percent. As of the 2011 census, the Colombian population was the fourth-largest Latin American population in Australia, behind Chile, Brazil, and Argentina. Due to a low understanding of English and work restrictions of student visas, newly-arrived Colombian Australians tend to work in low-skilled jobs until they obtain greater qualifications, working in higher-skilled jobs once their understanding of English has improved, and applying for permanent residency in Australia if they meet the requirements.

== Demographics ==
As of the 2021 Australian census, 35,033 people in Australia reported being born in Colombia. Of these, a majority said they had arrived in the country between the years 2016 and 2021. About two-thirds were not Australian citizens, most followed the Catholic faith, and 80 percent stated they were bilingual in another language and spoke English well or very well. Within the state of Victoria, the City of Melbourne was the local government area with the highest Colombian-born population as of the 2016 census.

At the 2011 census, 10,193 people answered that they had Colombian ancestry.

== Cuisine ==
As a result of the increasing Colombian population in Australia, more Colombian restaurants in the country have opened. El Dorado in the central business district of Melbourne was one of the country's first Colombian restaurants, opening in 2004. According to Paula Gomez, owner of the La Colombianita restaurant in South Melbourne, most Colombians in Victoria live in and around the Melbourne suburbs of Southbank and South Melbourne.

The dishes bandeja paisa and ajiaco soup are a staple of Colombian cuisine in Australia, with ingredients such as papas criollas imported frozen from Colombia to Australia.

== Notable people ==
- Adam Garcia, actor
- Amyl, drag queen
- Kat Hoyos, actress
- María Fernanda Cardoso, artist
- Gustavo Giron Marulanda, footballer

== See also ==
- Australia–Colombia relations
- White Colombians
- Mestizo Colombians
- Colombian diaspora
- European Australians
- Europeans in Oceania
- Hispanic and Latin American Australians
- Immigration to Australia
- Colombian New Zealanders
