= Villagra =

Villagra is a surname. Notable people with the surname include:

- Annabel Edith Villagra (1936–2021), Argentine dancer better known as Fanne Foxe
- Carlos Villagra (born 1976), Paraguayan footballer
- Claudio Villagra (born 1996), Argentine footballer
- Cristian Villagra (born 1985), Argentine footballer
- Eduardo Villagra (born 1990), Chilean footballer
- Federico Villagra (born 1969), Argentine rally driver
- Gonzalo Villagra (born 1981), Chilean footballer
- Guillermo Villagrá (1907–1970), Argentine footballer
- Gustavo Villagra (born 1970), Argentine retired footballer
- José Luis Villagra (born 1986), Argentine footballer
- Juan Cruz Villagra (born 2000), Argentine footballer
- Nelson Villagra (born 1937), Chilean actor, writer and director
- Rodrigo Villagra (born 2001), Argentine footballer
- Sergio Villagra (born 1973), Australian rules football umpire

== See also ==
- Villagra Point, headland in Antarctica
- de Villagra (disambiguation)
