= Chilean Australians =

Chilean community in Australia

Chilean Australians Chileno-australiano
- (Chile) (Australia)
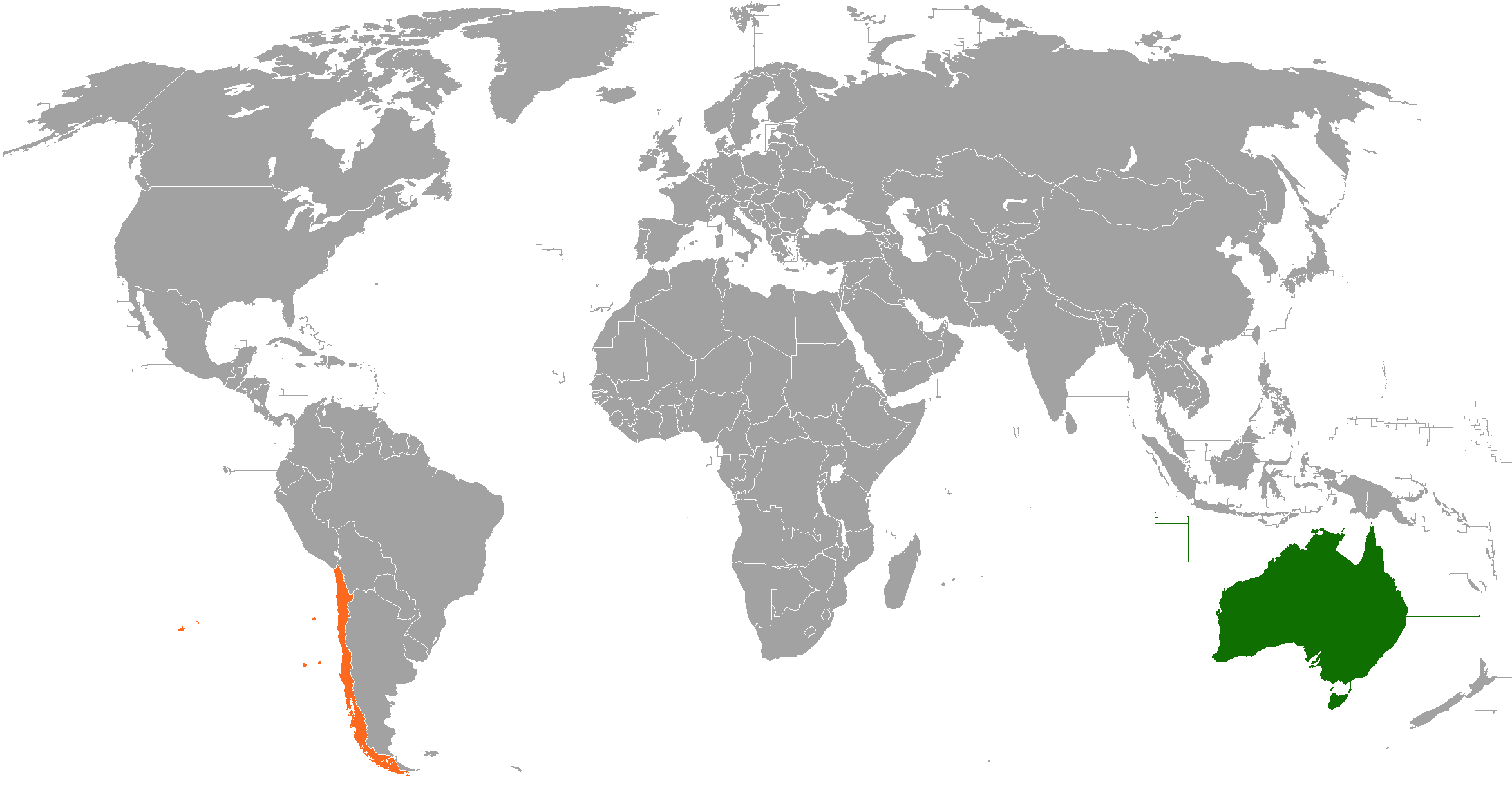

Total population
- 29,856 (by birth, 2021); 41,270 (by ancestry, 2021)

Regions with significant populations
- Sydney, Melbourne, Brisbane, Adelaide and Perth.

Languages
- English and Spanish; others speak German, Italian, Mapudungun, and Rapa Nui

Religion
- Roman Catholic (Predominantly); Protestant; Evangelical; Jewish

Related ethnic groups
- other Hispanic and Latin American Australians, Spaniards, other Europeans, Mapuche, Rapa Nui

Chilean Australians (Spanish: chilenos australianos) are Australians of Chilean descent or Chileans who have obtained Australian citizenship. Chileans are the largest group of Hispanic American Australians, as well as being the second largest group of Latin American Australians (behind Brazilian Australians) residing in the country. The biggest Chilean Australian communities are primarily found in Sydney, Melbourne and Canberra.

== Demography ==
According to the 2006 Australian Census, 23,305 Australians were born in Chile while 25,439 claimed Chilean ancestry, either alone or with another ancestry. The Australian 2001 Census reports that 63% of Chilean-born respondents nominated their leading ancestry as Spaniard, while others nominated a Croatian (19%), German (8%), Italian (6%) or English (4%) ancestry.

The largest Chilean Australian communities are in Sydney (10,909 residents, 2006 Census result) and Melbourne (6,530).

A Chilean government study conducted by the Chilean National Institute of Statistics in 2003-04 and published in 2005 found that 33,626 first and second generation Chileans were living in Australia. This figure was gathered by combining the population reported in the 2001 Australian Census and the National Registry for Chileans living abroad. One estimate of Chilean-Australians (including those born in Chile and those of Chilean descent) is approximately 40,000, another 2006 estimate is as high as 45,000.

== History and cultural background ==
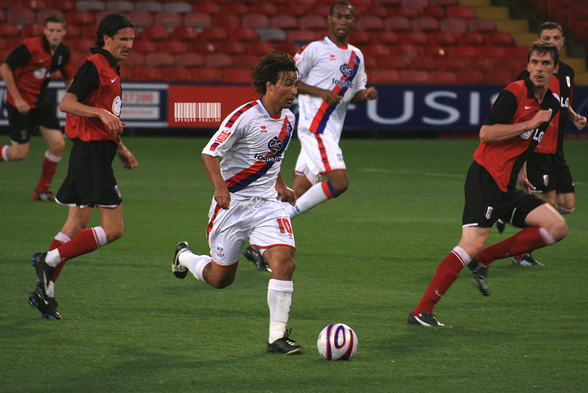
Nick Carle

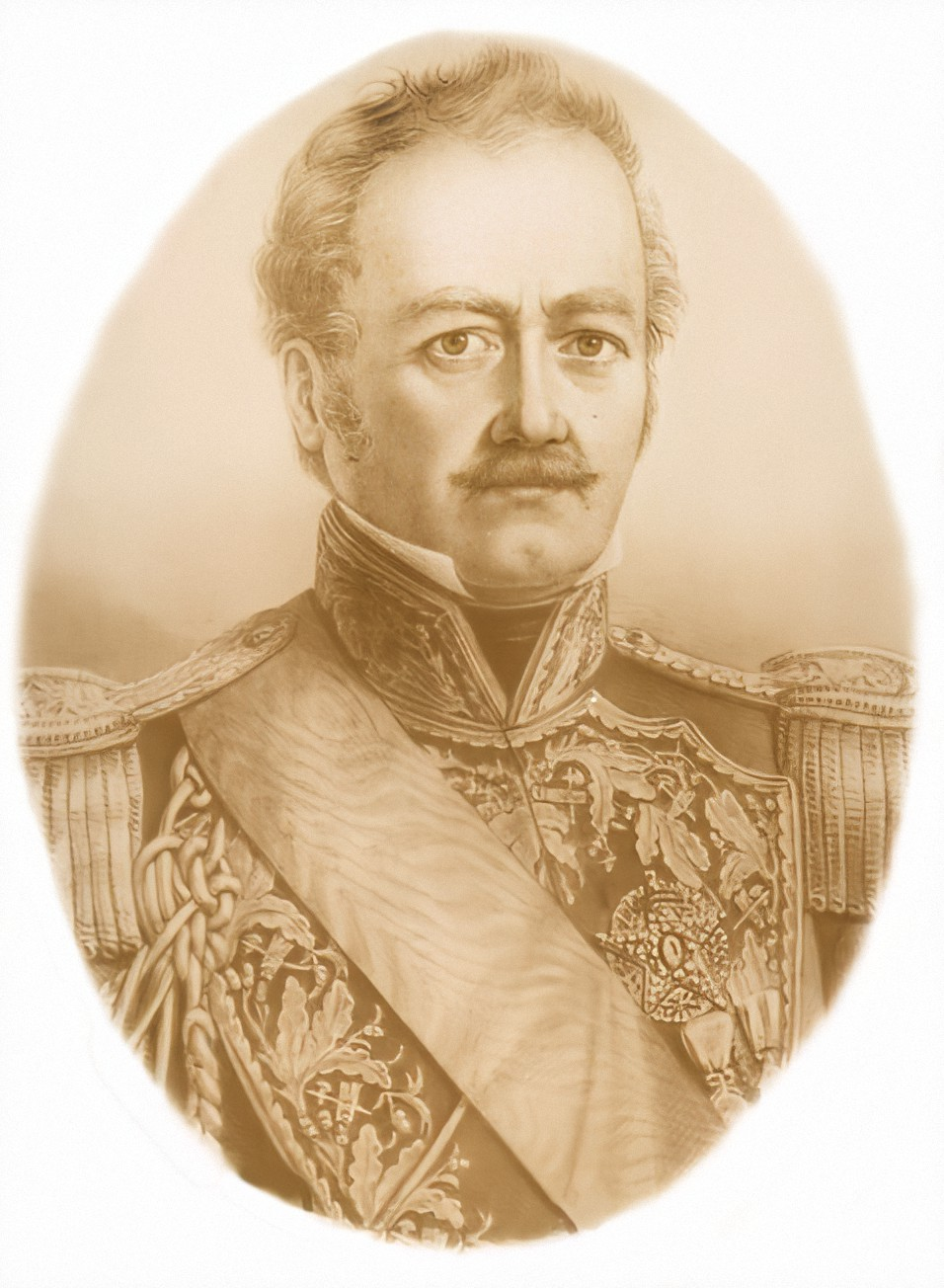
Ramón Freire

In 1837, two Chileans arrived in Sydney, the first on record in Australia. One was former Chilean president Ramón Freire, exiled from Chile after attempting to re-take power in a coup. He did not settle in Australia, however, and eventually returned to his homeland.

Chilean migration to Australia occurred at different times from the late 19th century and throughout the 20th century. A large wave of Chileans arrived to Australia in the 1850s after the California gold rush they had participated in. In Australia Chileans joined the Australian gold rushes that begun in 1851. Along with the Chileans came also mining technologies they had introduced to California such as the Chilean mill which became common in Australian mining. Not all Chileans stayed and there are estimates of 350 Chileans leaving Australia in the early 1860s to join the gold rush in New Zealand.

The first Labour Party Prime Minister of Australia, and the first leader of a social democratic party to become a national head of government, Chris Watson, was born in Valparaíso, Chile the son of a Chilean citizen of German descent.

Migration studies demonstrate that late 20th century Chilean migration to Australia occurred in three distinguishable waves.

In the 1960s, especially between the years 1968-70, around 1,500-2,000 Chileans arrived in Australia as a consequence of the economic recession produced during the government of Eduardo Frei Montalva, and the high level of unemployment at the termination of his administration. The majority of these people were middle class and well educated, and their migration can be seen to have an economic basis.

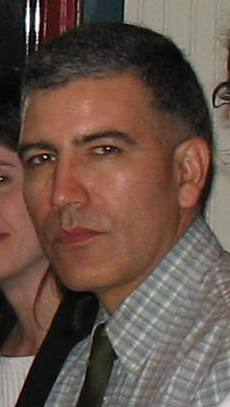
Frank Duarte

The second significant group to arrive was likely motivated by the presidential election of Salvador Allende in 1970. Allende was the world's first democratically elected Marxist President of any nation. His ascension to the presidency provoked a high level of uncertainty amongst the wealthy, given his stated platform of nationalisation of mining, industry, and services. The political and economic unrest that followed prompted many Chileans to flee the threat of political and social instability. This group was, again, overwhelmingly middle class, with sufficient resources (education and finance) to establish themselves as small business operators within Australia. By 1971, 3,760 Chilean-born people were registered in Australia. In this group arrived laser physicist and author Frank Duarte who became the first South American to graduate with a Ph.D. from an Australian university, and leader of the Macquarie science reform movement.

The third distinguishable wave of immigration to Australia was the greatest in number by far, and was characterised in large part by Chileans fleeing their homeland as a consequence of political events following the 1973 military coup and subsequent military dictatorship of Augusto Pinochet. This wave of Chilean migrants was quite homogeneous, comprised in the majority by skilled workers, and at times, their families. In this regard the middle class was represented only in the minority. Political elitists and intellectuals from the left were also small in numbers, due to their preference for Eastern Europe and socialist nations in the Hispanic world. Former president of Chile Michelle Bachelet briefly lived in Australia with family already present in the country after the coup of 1973 later moving to East Germany. Augusto Pinochet's dictatorship over Chile lasted until 1990. During his regime more than 500,000 Chileans fled the country, 21,029 of whom sought sanctuary in Australia. However, several thousand have and are still returning to Chile from all over the world as the economic boom of the country has prospered the nation. Moreover, since the latter part of the 1980s, many Chileans who had worked for the military government have also emigrated to Australia, leading to a degree of tension with and periodic denunciations from other Chilean Australians.

== Notable Chilean Australians ==
- Nick Carle
- Angelo Costanzo
- F. J. Duarte
- Pia Miller
- Rodrigo Palomino
- Indi Hartwell
- Jose Romero
- Rodrigo Vargas
- Sergio Villagra
- Chris Watson
- Tim Kelly
- Michael Lira

== See also ==
- Australia–Chile relations
- European Australians
- Europeans in Oceania
- Hispanic and Latin American Australians
- Immigration to Australia
