= Palomino (surname) =

Palomino is a Hispanic surname that may refer to the following notable people:

- Andrés Palomino (born 1978), Spanish webcomic creator and screenwriter
- Antonio Palomino (1653–1726), Spanish painter and writer
- Carlos Palomino (born 1949), Mexican boxer
- Carmelo Palomino Kayser (1952–2000), Spanish poet and painter
- Elisa Palomino (born 1969), Spanish fashion designer
- Elnis Palomino (born 1986), Dominican Republic volleyball player
- Emilio Palomino (1880–?), Cuban baseball outfielder
- Eusebia Palomino Yenes (1899–1935), Spanish nun
- Francisco Lopez y Palomino, 18th century Spanish painter
- Frank Palomino (born 1970), Peruvian football player
- Hermes Palomino (born 1988), Venezuelan football forward
- Jairo Palomino (born 1988), Colombian football player
- José Luis Palomino (born 1990), Argentine football player
- Juan Bernabé Palomino (1692–1777), Spanish engraver
- Luis Palomino (born 1980), Peruvian mixed martial arts fighter
- Marcelo Palomino (born 2001), American association football player
- Mercedes Palomino (1913–2006), Spanish-born Quebec actor and theatre director
- Óscar Palomino (born 1972), Spanish boxer
- Pedro Mártir Palomino (died 1596), Roman Catholic prelate in Venezuela
- Roberto Sánchez Palomino (born 1969), Peruvian psychologist and politician
- Ronald Palomino (born 1998), Colombian professional squash player
- Rodolfo Cerrón Palomino (born 1940), Peruvian linguist
- Rodrigo Palomino (born 1973), Australian football midfielder
- Rosa Palomino, Aymara Indigenous leader in Peru
