= John McEwen House =

Headquarters of the Australian Federal National Party

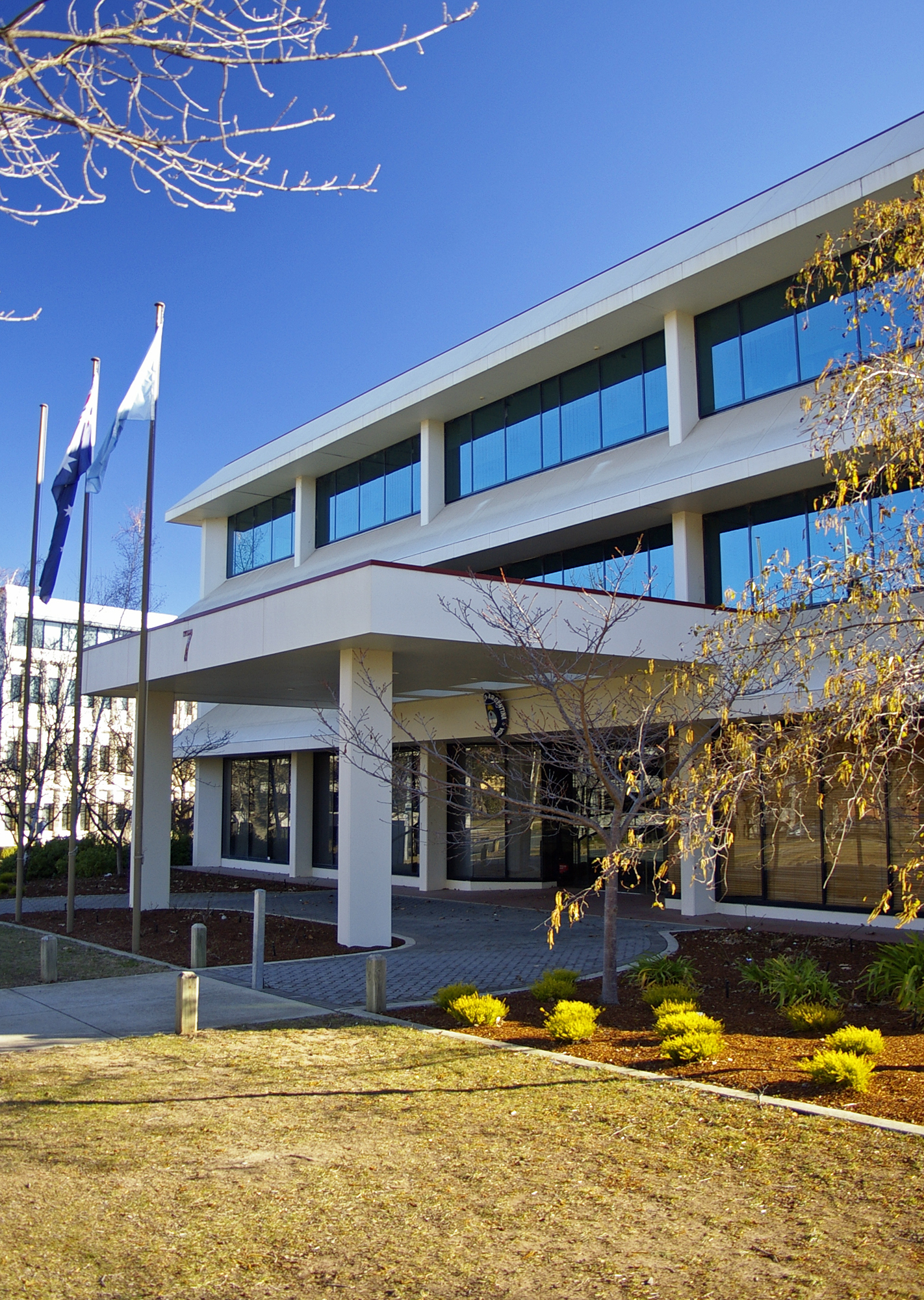
- View of the front of the building
- Alternative names: National Party Headquarters, McEwen House

General information
- Location: Barton, Canberra, Australian Capital Territory, 7 National Circuit, Barton, ACT 2600
- Named for: John McEwen
- Opened: 4 November 1968; 57 years ago
- Cost: $262,000 (equivalent to $3,645,088 in 2022)
- Owner: IFM Investors

Technical details
- Floor area: 12,000 sq. ft

The John McEwen House, or National Party Headquarters, is the head-office, or headquarters, of the Federal National Party. It was officially opened by Prime Minister John Gorton on 4 November 1968. Unlike the Liberal Party Headquarters, the National Party HQ was built in honour of former Prime Minister and National Party Leader John McEwen whom was Deputy Prime Minister (alive) at the time. Whereas the Liberal Party HQ was renamed in honour of Robert Menzies posthumously. The total cost of the building was A$262,000, over $200k of which being donated for the project. As well as being the head-office for the National Party it also serves offices of other organisations, including the Argentine embassy, and the National Party think tank: the Page Research Centre.

John McEwen House was sold to superannuation fund ISPT Pty Ltd in April 2020 for approximately $15 million, with the Nationals remaining as tenants under a leaseback arrangement.
