= Salvadoran Australians =

Salvadoreño-australiano
- (El Salvador) (Australia)
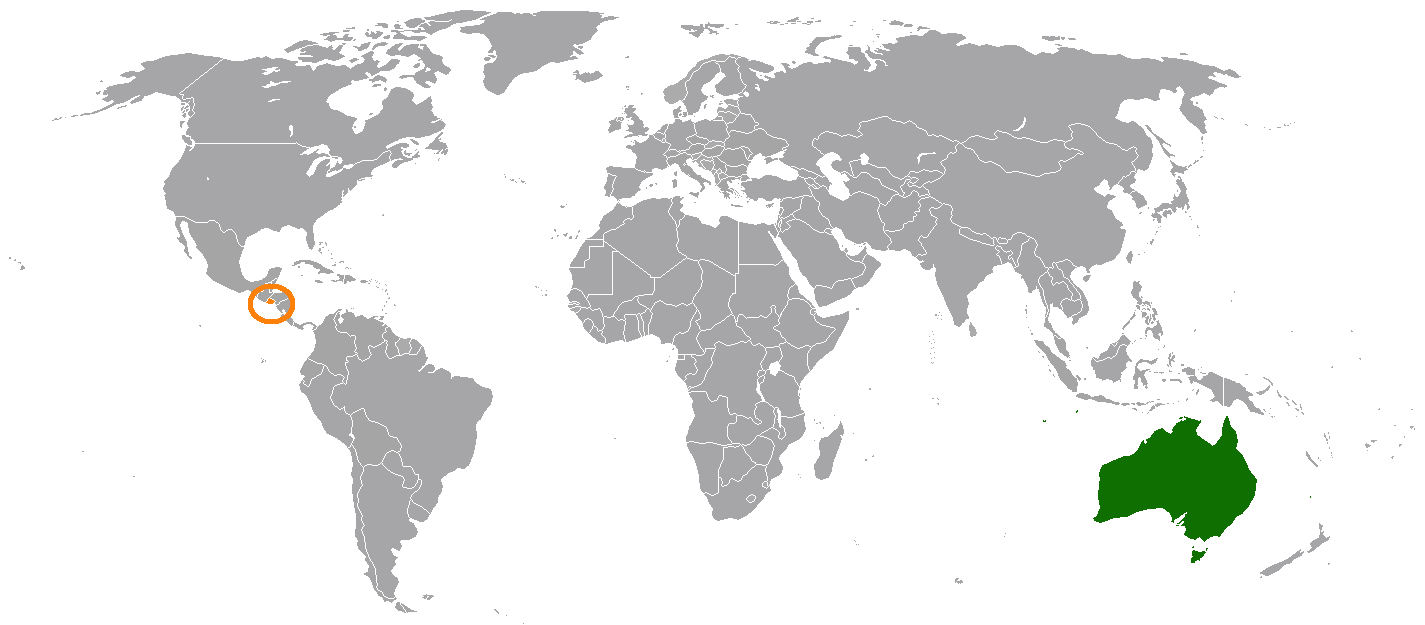

Total population
- 10,119 (by birth, 2021 Census); 20,000 (by ancestry)

Regions with significant populations
- Melbourne, Sydney and Brisbane.

Languages
- Salvadoran Spanish, Australian English

Religion
- Christianity (mostly Roman Catholicism)

Related ethnic groups
- Hispanic and Latin American Australians, White Hispanics, Mestizos

Salvadoran Australians (Spanish: Salvadoreño-australiano) are Australians of Salvadoran descent. Salvadoran immigration to Australia was caused principally by economic and political turmoil in El Salvador.

== History ==
The largest flow occurred when refugees left El Salvador during the Salvadoran Civil War in the 1980s. The first wave were former political prisoners whose immigration was facilitated by the Special Humanitarian Program in 1983. After this first group, which consisted of 75 people, another 10,000 Salvadorans arrived in Australia by 1986. Subsequent groups came—not directly from El Salvador—but from countries like Mexico and Costa Rica that housed Salvadoran refugees. Most Salvadoran-born Australians came prior to 2001; little followed after the civil war. The majority of Salvadorians that live in Australia are of white and mestizo ancestry. The majority of Salvadorans in Australia reside in Melbourne,(32%), followed by Brisbane, (21%), and Sydney, (18%).

Census data records showed 25% of Salvadoran Australians work in managerial or professional roles. A further 23% work in production, transport and trades; 20% are labourers. Many migrants from El Salvador are skilled workers, but their lack of fluent English forced them into unskilled jobs. Over 92% speak Spanish at home, and the majority are Catholic. Evangelical born-again Christians of Salvadoran descent exist in increasing numbers.

A 2006 estimation placed the Salvadorian population as high as 18,755.

== Ethnicity ==
Many of the Salvadoran immigrants are of mixed European and Amerindian (mestizo) ancestry, with a smaller minority of people with predominant or full European ancestry. Many can trace their roots back to Spain, Italy, Portugal, Germany, France, Ireland, Poland, and other European countries. In northern departments like the Chalatenango Department, it is well known that residents in the area are of pure Spanish descent. The governor of San Salvador, Francisco Luis Héctor de Carondelet, ordered families from northern Spain (Galicia and Asturias) to settle the area to compensate for the lack of indigenous people to work the land; it is common to see people with blond hair, fair skin, and blue or green eyes in municipalities like Dulce Nombre de María, La Palma, and El Pital. However, the majority of Salvadorans of full Spanish descent possess Mediterranean racial features: olive skin and dark hair and eyes (black or dark brown) and identify with the mestizo majority. A majority of Central European settlers in El Salvador arrived during World War II as refugees from the Czech Republic, Germany, Hungary, Poland, and Switzerland, most of them stayed in Chalatenango. Many Jews emigrated to El Salvador during World War II as refugees with the help of José Castellanos Contreras. Indigenous Salvadorans make up less than one percent of the population and are mostly of Pipil and Lenca ancestries; some are Mayan.

== Notable people ==
- Carlos Barrios, artist

== See also ==
- Australia–El Salvador relations
- Hispanic and Latin American Australians
- Salvadoran Americans
