= Palomino (disambiguation) =

Palomino is a horse color.

Palomino may also refer to:

== Arts and entertainment ==
- Palomino (film), a 1991 TV movie starring Lindsay Frost
- Palomino Blonde (a.k.a. Omega-minus), a 1975 spy fiction novel by Ted Allbeury
- Palomino (novel), a 1980 novel by Elizabeth Jolley
- Danielle Steel's 'Palomino', a 1991 American made-for-TV film based on a 1981 novel by Danielle Steel
- USS Palomino, a fictional spaceship in the 1979 Disney movie The Black Hole

=== Music ===
- Palomino Road, American country music group
- Palomino (Trampled by Turtles album), 2010
- Palomino (Miranda Lambert album), 2022
- Palomino (First Aid Kit album), 2022
- "Palomino" (song), a song by Gemma Hayes
- "Palomino", a 1988 song by Duran Duran from Big Thing
- Los Palominos, a tejano group

== Biology ==
- Palomino rabbit
- Palomino trout, a golden color variant of rainbow trout
- Palomino (grape), a breed of grape

== Places ==
- Palomino, Colombia, a small town in Colombia South America
- Palomino Club (Las Vegas), a strip club in Las Vegas, Nevada
- Palomino Club (North Hollywood), an influential country music venue in Los Angeles, California
- Palomino Islands (Peru)
- Isla Palominos (Puerto Rico), near Fajardo

== Other uses ==
- Palomino (surname)
- A mountain bike by Klein Bikes
- The initial core of AMD's Athlon XP processor
