= De Villagra =

de Villagra or de Villagrá is a surname. Notable people with the surname include:

- Francisco de Villagra (1511–1563), Spanish conquistador
- Gaspar Pérez de Villagrá (1555–1620), Spanish explorer
- Pedro de Villagra (1513–1577), Spanish explorer and general

== See also ==
- Villagra (disambiguation)
