= Australia–Colombia relations =

- Australia: Colombia

Australia–Colombia relations refer to the bilateral relations between the Commonwealth of Australia and the Republic of Colombia. Both nations are members of the United Nations, International Monetary Fund, International Maritime Organization, World Bank, World Trade Organization and Organisation for Economic Co-operation and Development.

== History ==
The two countries established diplomatic relations on 9 September 1975. Colombia's first diplomatic representation in Australia was opened in Canberra between 1998 and 2002, and was later reopened in 2008. in July 2012, the Australian Government progressed by opening the Australian Consulate-General in Colombia, under the direction of Austrade, in order to ease business exchange and academic mobility. The office constituted Australia's first permanent presence in Colombia, enhancing and supporting the work of the Non-Resident Embassy, located in Santiago. The dynamism between Colombia and Australia has resulted the minister of foreign affairs, Julie Bishop, to establish Australia's first permanent representation in Bogotá on 27 June 2017.

== High-level visits ==
High-level visits from Australia to Colombia

- Trade Minister Craig Emerson (2012)
- Trade Minister Steven Ciobo (2016)
- OECD Secretary General Mathias Cormann (2020)

High-level visits from Colombia to Australia

- Multilateral Affairs Patti Londoño (2012)
- Vice Minister of Foreign Trade Gabriel Duque (2012)
- Director of Asia Juan Guillermo Castro (2012)
- Director of International Trade Juan Carlos Cadena (2012)

== Agreements ==
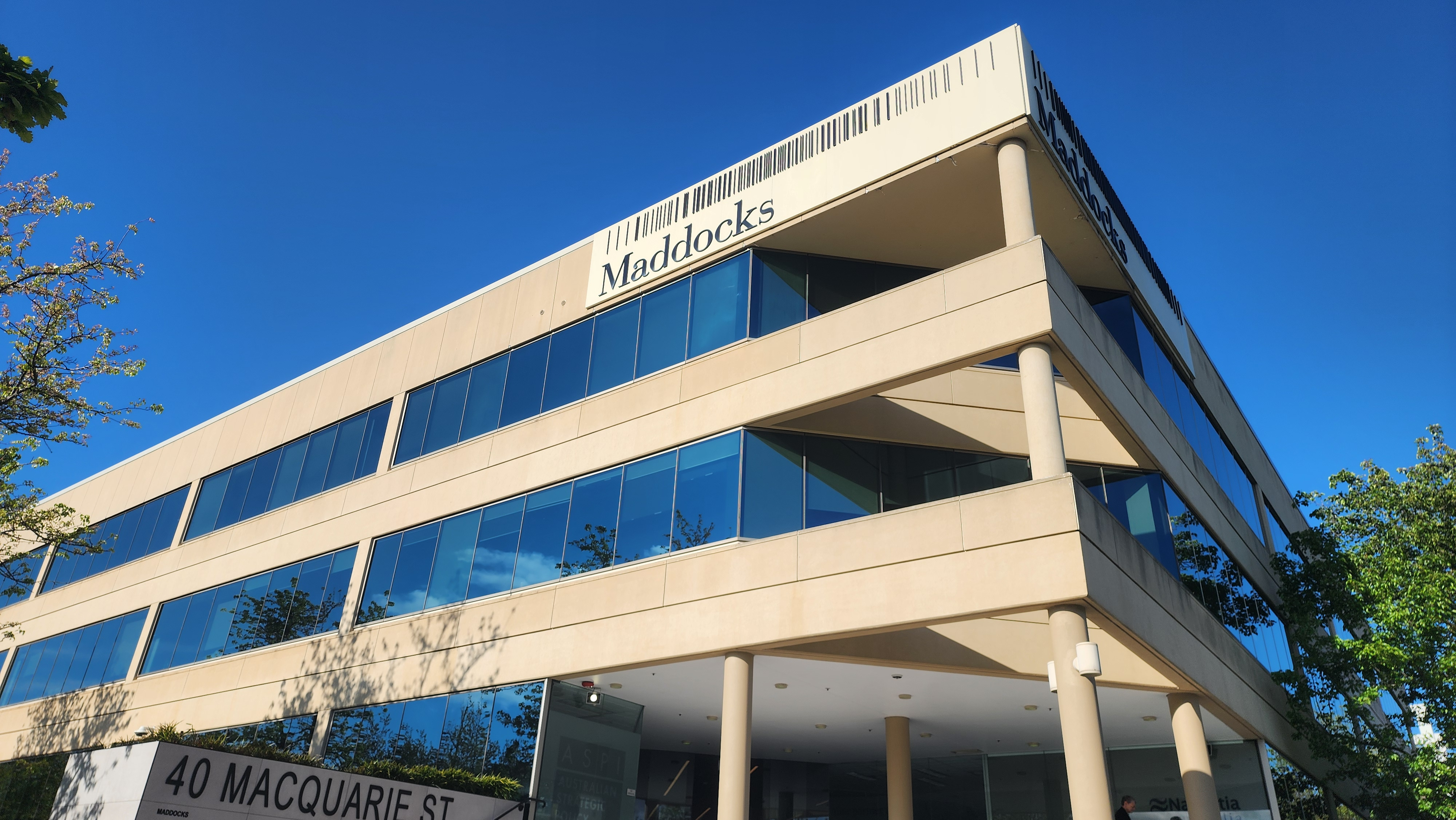
Embassy of Colombia in Barton (As of 2026)

Both nations have signed several bilateral agreements such as a Memorandum of Understanding on Strengthening Bilateral Trade and Investment (2009); Memorandum of Understanding on Police Cooperation and Information Exchange (2013); Memorandum of Understanding on Bilateral Cooperation in the Mining Industry (2014); Work Plan on education, training and research (2015); Memorandum of Understanding on Bilateral Cooperation in the Hydrocarbons Industry (2016); Memorandum of Understanding on Bilateral Cooperation in the Hydrocarbons Industry (2016); Memorandum of Understanding between the Administrative Department of Science, Technology and Innovation of Colombia (COLCIENCIAS) and the Australian National University (2017); Air Services Agreement (2019); Memorandum of Understanding on Cooperation in Preventing and Combatting Transnational Crime (2021) and a Memorandum of Understanding on Education and Timing (2022).

== Trade ==
In 2016, total exports to Australia reached US$47.6 million. Companies from Colombia exported non-mining-energy products to Australia for amounts worth US$10,000. In 2022, Colombia exported $289 million to Australia, with the exports related to gold, coffee, and coal briquettes. Australia also exported $46.3M to Colombia. The main products exported from Australia to Colombia included Orthopedic Appliances ($6.43M), Cyanides ($5.45M), and High-voltage Protection Equipment ($2.09M). Education is the most recognised export to Colombia (worth $430 million in 2016–17). It also includes the mining, equipment, technology and services (METS) sector.

== Resident diplomatic missions ==
- Australia has an embassy in Bogotá.
- Colombia has an embassy in Canberra.

== See also ==
- Australia–Colombia bilateral treaties
- Colombian Australians
- List of ambassadors of Australia to Colombia
