= Argentina–Australia relations =

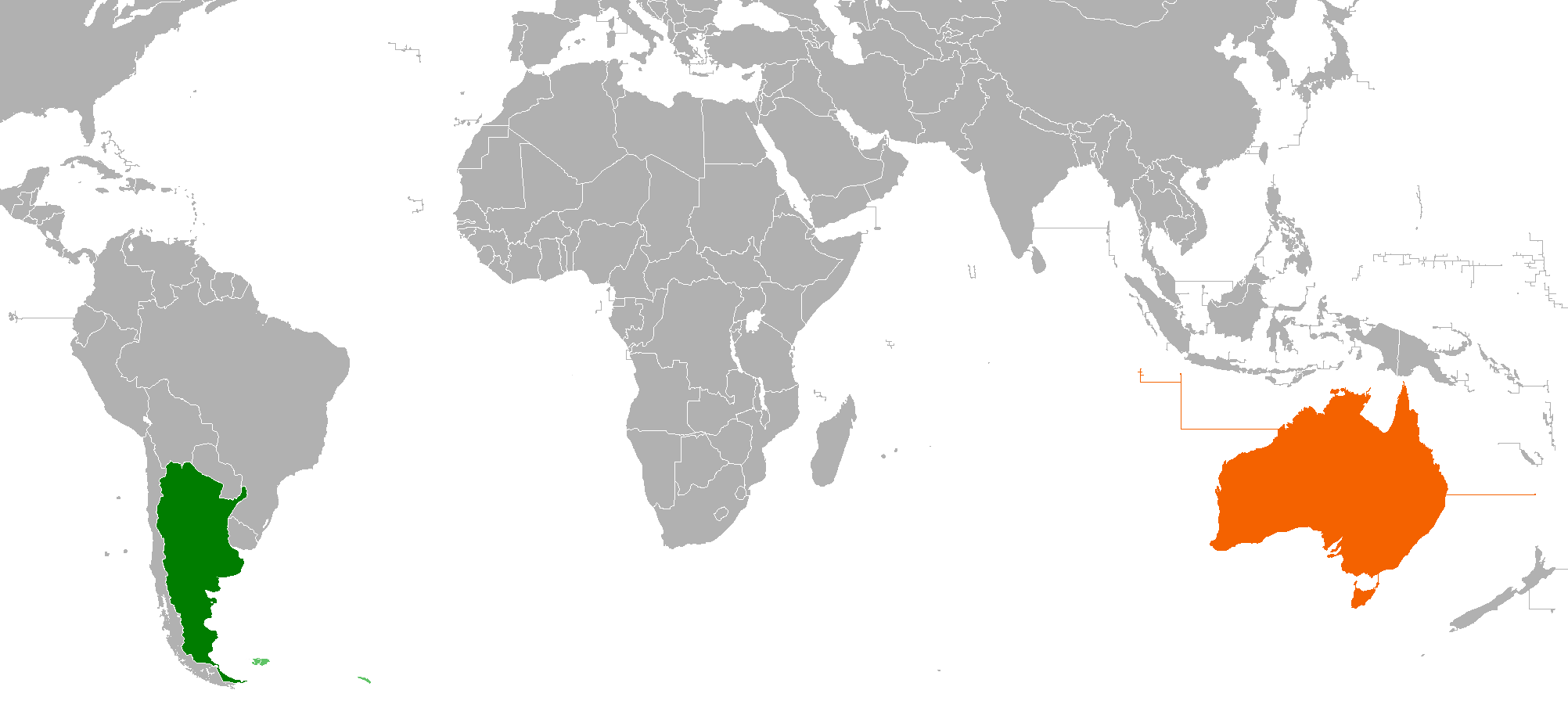

- Argentina: Australia

Argentina–Australia relations are the diplomatic and bilateral relations between the Argentine Republic and the Commonwealth of Australia that have existed for years. The two countries have similar histories of being European settler colonies in the Southern Hemisphere, and are both members of the Cairns Group, Forum of East Asia–Latin America Cooperation, G20, World Trade Organization and the United Nations.

== History ==
Argentina and Australia established diplomatic relations soon after World War II. In December 1959 both nations agreed in principle to open resident diplomatic missions. In 1962, Argentina opened a diplomatic office in Sydney. In 1963, Argentina upgraded its diplomatic office to an embassy and moved it to Canberra. In 1964, the first Australian ambassador presented credentials in Buenos Aires.

During the Falklands War between Argentina and the United Kingdom (April - June 1982), Australia sided with the United Kingdom and imposed sanctions against and refused all imports from Argentina. Relations between Argentina and Australia slowly returned to normal after the war. In July 1986, President Raúl Alfonsin became the first Argentine head of state to visit Australia. Over a decade later, in March 1998, President Carlos Menem also made a state visit to Australia. Scott Morrison was the first Australian Prime Minister to visit Argentina during 2018 G20 Buenos Aires summit.

== High-level visits ==
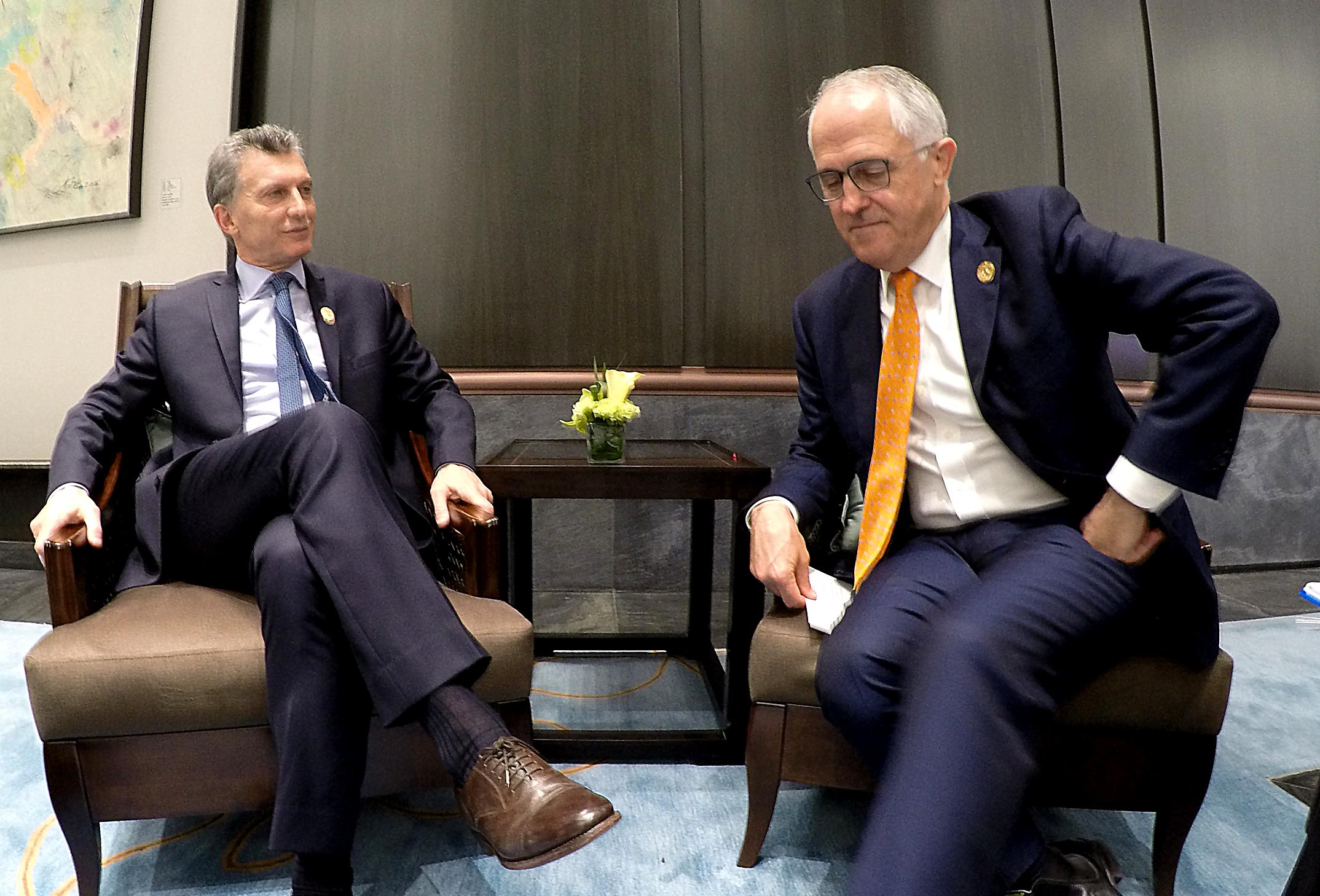
Argentine President Mauricio Macri and Australian Prime-Minister Malcolm Turnbull meeting during the G20 summit in Hangzhou, China; September 2016.

High-level visits from Argentina to Australia

- President Raúl Alfonsin (1986)
- President Carlos Menem (1998)
- Vice-president Gabriela Michetti (2017)

High-level visits from Australia to Argentina

- Governor-General Peter Cosgrove (2016)
- Prime Minister Scott Morrison (2018)

== Bilateral Agreements ==
Both nations have signed several bilateral agreements, such as an Extradition Treaty (1990); Agreement on Mutual Assistance in Criminal Matters (1993); Agreement on Investment Protection (1997); Agreement on minerals trade and investment (1998); Agreement on the avoidance of Double-Taxation (2000); Agreement on Science and Technology (2003); Agreement on Air Services (2005); Agreement on work and holiday visas (2011); Agreement on Cooperation in the peaceful uses of Nuclear Energy (2005) and a Memorandum of Understanding Agreement on Education, Training and Research (2017).

== Tourism ==
In 2016, 52,996 Australian citizens paid a visit to Argentina for tourism. During that same period, 18,775 Argentine citizens paid a visit to Australia.

== Trade ==
In 2016, trade between Argentina and Australia totaled $1.076 billion AUS. Argentina's main exports to Australia include: Animal feed, vehicles, oil-seeds, oleaginous fruits and fixed vegetable oils and fats. Australia's main exports to Argentina include: Coal, crude vegetable matter, railway vehicles and leather. Over 50 Australian companies operate in Argentina. Around $1 billion AUS has been invested in Argentina by Australian firms since 2016.

== Resident diplomatic missions ==
- Argentina has an embassy in Canberra, and a consulate-general in Sydney.
- Australia has an embassy in Buenos Aires.
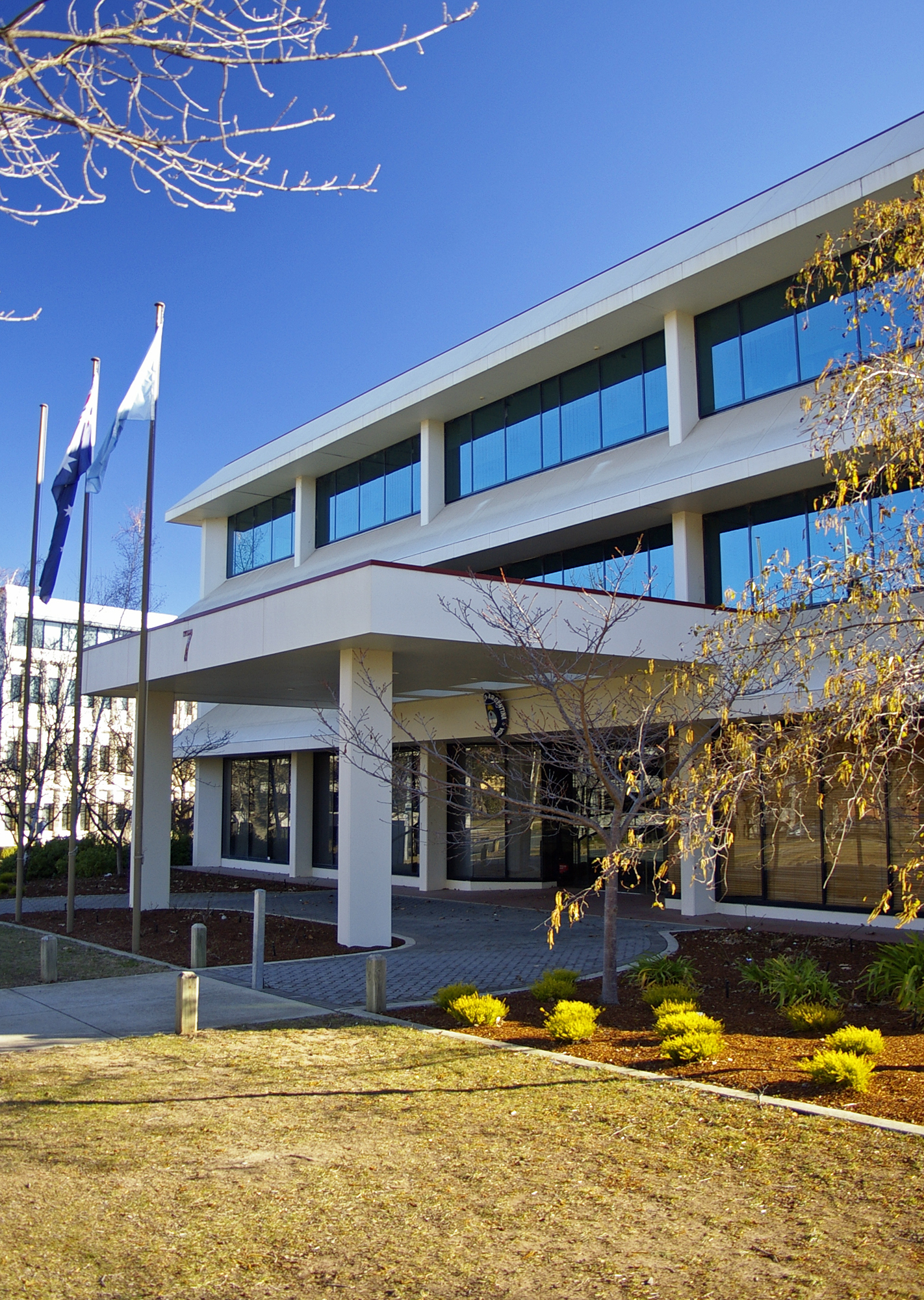
Embassy of Argentina in Canberra

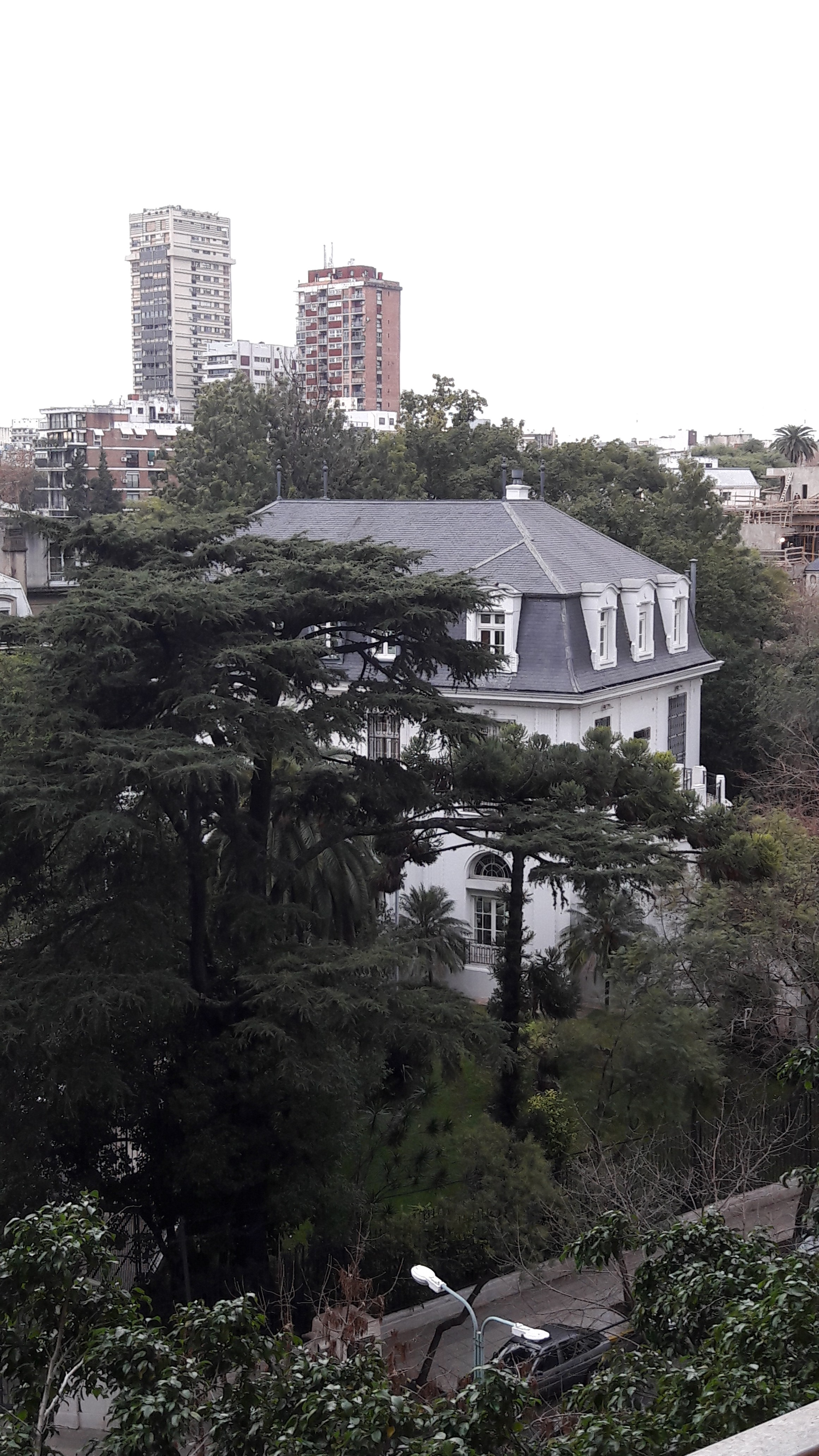
Embassy of Australia in Buenos Aires

== See also ==
- Argentine Australians
- Argentina–Australia bilateral treaties
- Immigration to Australia
- List of ambassadors of Australia to Argentina
