= Australia–El Salvador relations =

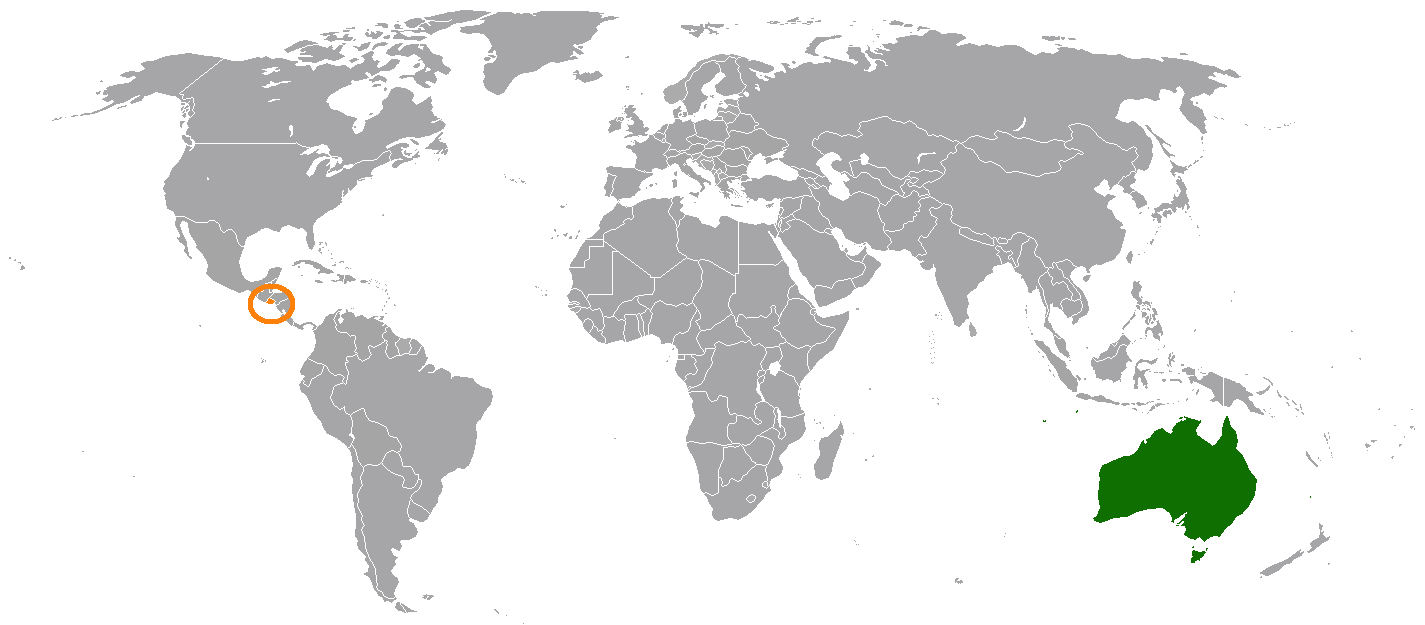

- Australia: El Salvador

Australia–El Salvador relations are the bilateral relations between Australia and El Salvador. The relations centre on the arrival of Salvadoran refugees to Australia during the Salvadoran Civil War. There is a community of approximately 20,000 people of Salvadoran origin in Australia. Australia is home to the third largest Salvadoran community living abroad. Both nations are members of the Forum of East Asia–Latin America Cooperation and the United Nations.

== History ==
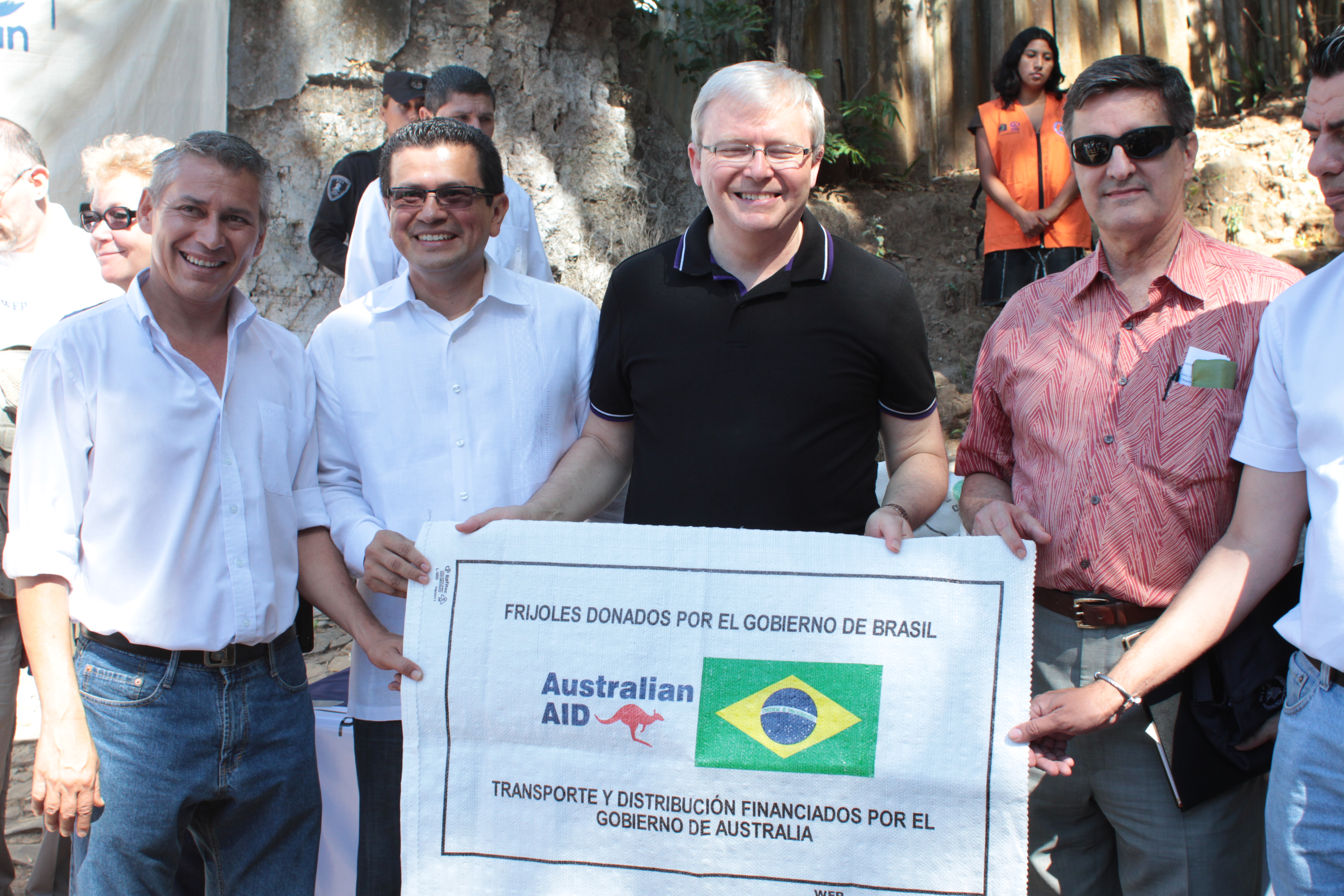
Australian Foreign Minister, Kevin Rudd, at El Peñón in Comasagua, El Salvador; December 2011.

Australia and El Salvador established diplomatic relations on 5 December 1983. At the time of establishing diplomatic relations, El Salvador was in the midst of a civil war. Taking a humanitarian approach, Australia received its first group of 75 Salvadoran refugees in 1983. As the civil war progressed in El Salvador, between 1983 and 1986 Australia accepted 10,000 Salvadorans under the Special Humanitarian Program.

In 2005, El Salvador opened a consulate-general in Melbourne and in September 2012, El Salvador opened its first resident embassy in Canberra. In December 2011, Australian Foreign Minister, Kevin Rudd, paid a visit to El Salvador to assess the damages caused by Tropical Storm Arlene. As a result, Australia donated US$400,000 to assist those affected by the Tropical Storm.

In 2016, Australia and the United States agreed for Australia to do more to assist refugees coming from regions such as Central America and Africa in exchange for the United States settling up to 1,250 asylum seekers detained at the Manus Regional Processing Centre and the Nauru Regional Processing Centre. Under this agreement, the first thirty refugees fleeing gang violence in El Salvador were granted asylum in Australia in December 2017. In 2017, Australian Special Envoy for Human Rights, Phillip Ruddock, paid a visit to El Salvador.

Annually, the Australian Government provides financial support to a range of projects in El Salvador. Since 2016, the Australian Aid has supported projects to empower women with disabilities, train youth to promote a culture of peace, provide access to clean water and help communities adapt to climate change.

== Resident diplomatic missions ==
- Australia is accredited to El Salvador from its embassy in Mexico City, Mexico and maintains an honorary consulate in San Salvador.
- El Salvador has an embassy in Canberra and a consulate-general in Melbourne.

== See also ==
- Foreign relations of Australia
- Foreign relations of El Salvador
- Australia–El Salvador bilateral treaties
- Salvadoran Australians
