= Peruvian Australians =

Peruvian Australians Peruano Australiano
- (Peru) (Australia)
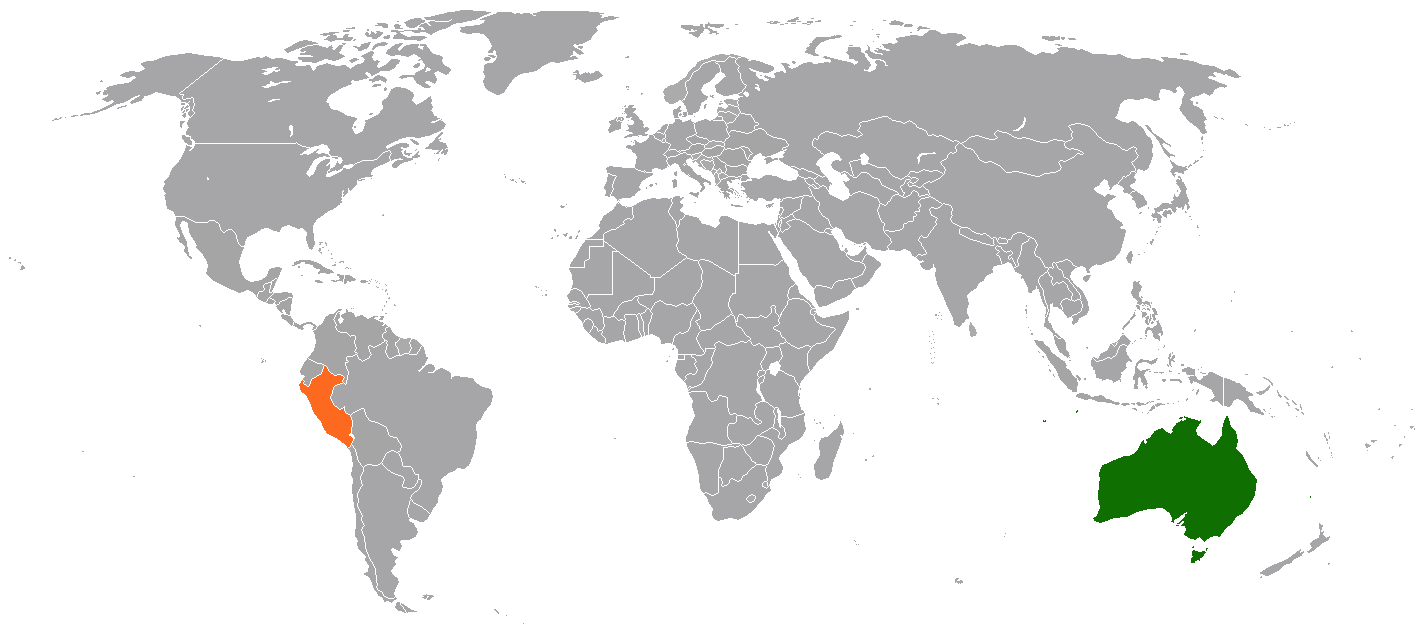

Total population
- Peruvian; 8,440 (by birth, 2011 Census); 8,630 (by ancestry, 2011 Census)

Regions with significant populations
- New South Wales: 5,714
- Victoria: 1,416
- Queensland: 1,128

Languages
- English (Australian English), Spanish (Peruvian Spanish)

Religion
- Christianity (Predominantly Roman Catholicism, Protestantism)

Related ethnic groups
- Hispanic and Latin American Australians

Peruvian Australians refers to Australian citizens of Peruvian descent or Peru-born person who reside in Australia.

Most Peruvian Australians reside in the state of New South Wales.

== Demographics ==
According to a census carried in 2016 by Department of Home Affairs, 9,556 Australians were born in Peru, while 11,139 claimed Peruvian ancestry.

The 2016 distribution by State and Territory showed New South Wales had the largest number with 5,714 followed by Victoria (1,416), and Queensland (1,128)

== History ==
The first official record of Peruvians in Australia is the census conducted in 1901 when 28 Peruvians were recorded.

Immigration from Peru remained small until the late 1960s when the numbers started to increase slowly.

Arrivals have continued to rise in the 21st century, with 24.6% of the Peru-born population arriving in Australia between 2007 and 2011.

== Notable people ==
- Nathalie Kelley, actress
- Mariafe Artacho del Solar, beach volleyballer
- Andrew Durante, Australian footballer
- Tristan Hammond, Australian footballer
- Alexander Robertson (footballer, born 2003), Australian footballer
- Gabriela Ruffels, Australian golfer
- Ryan Ruffels, Australian golfer
- Nick Shipley, Australian rules footballer
- Ashley Zukerman, Australian-American actor
- Wendy Zukerman, Australian-American Actor
- Joey Mawson, Australian racing driver

== See also ==
- Australia–Peru relations
- Hispanic and Latin American Australians
- Peruvian diaspora
- Immigration to Australia
