= Carlos Barrios =

Salvadoran-Australian artist

Carlos Barrios is a Salvadoran-Australian artist.

== Early life ==
Carlos Manuel Barrios Rosa was born in San Salvador, El Salvador, Central America in 1966. Barrios' father was an archaeologist who introduced him to the art and artifacts of ancient Central American cultures from an early age. Barrios first began to paint at the age of six. In 1980 the Salvadoran civil war began and continued for twelve years. During the war his family often had no electricity and he would draw by the light of a candle. Barrios was mentored by the artist Ramón Merino in El Salvador who taught him the technique of oil painting. Barrios immigrated to Australia in 1990 where upon arrival in Sydney he joined the East Sydney Technical College, which was later established as the National Art School in 1996 after NAS separated itself from TAFE.

== Career ==
The primary subject matter of Barrios' work includes the human form, animals and spirits. Barrios works with the mediums of oil, charcoal, acrylic, mixed media and bronze.

Early in his career Barrios won the following awards:

- 1995 Salvadorian Art Prize, El Salvador
- 1995 Zacatecoluca Art Prize, El Salvador
- 1997 Cultural Diversity Art Prize, Fairfield
- 1999 Spanish Club Art Prize, Sydney
- 2000 Spanish Club Art Prize, Sydney

Barrios' artwork was exhibited at Art Hop 1997 at the Museum of Contemporary Art, Sydney and he was the artist in residence at the Melbourne Exhibition Centre in 1998. In 2000 Barrios' work was included at the Central American Biennale, San Jose.

In 2003 Barrios' artwork was exhibited at the Australian Museum as part of the exhibition "Death – The Last Taboo". Barrios has twice been a finalist for the Art Gallery of New South Wales Sulman Art Prize, in 2005 with "Pushing the pram", and again in 2006 with "Feeding time". Barrios has twice been a finalist for the Blake Prize for Religious Art, in 2006 with "Flying angel", and in 2007 with "Compassion". In 2008 his work was exhibited at the Miami Art Fair. Barrios' work was included in the 2009 "Reflections of Australia" group exhibition in China. He was the 2009 Liverpool City Art Prize, Two dimensional contemporary prize winner for his artwork "Festival".

Barrios' July 2010 solo exhibition "memorias, pasion y lineas" (memories, passion and lines) was opened by Australian artist John Olsen AO OBE. Barrios was a finalist for the 2010 Plein Air Art Prize at Parliament House in Canberra with "Robertson".

Barrios' studio was previously located in the NSW Southern Highlands town of Robertson, and is now moved to QLD, Gold Coast; the studio is not open to the public.
