= Hispanic and Latin American Australians =

Ethnic group

Total population
- 302,903 (total); 98,432 (by birth); 216,747 (by ancestry)

Regions with significant populations
- Sydney · Melbourne · Brisbane

Languages
- Australian English · Spanish · Portuguese

Religion
- Predominantly Christian: Catholic, with minorities of Atheists and Protestants

Related ethnic groups
- Hispanics · Lusitanics

Hispanic and Latin American Australians refers to Australians who are of Hispanic, and/or Latin American origin irrespective of their ancestral backgrounds, and their descendants. Brazilian Australians make up the largest proportion of Latin American Australians, while Chilean Australians make up the largest group of Hispanic Australians, followed by Salvadoran Australians. Most Hispanic and Latin American Australians speak English but many continue to use Spanish or Portuguese as well.

At the 2006 Census 86,156 Australian residents declared that they were born in South America (69,157), Central America (12,959) or the Caribbean (4,040). They constitute only 0.43% of the Australian population. Other statistics state that 1.12% of Australia's population are of Latin American origin. 93,795 residents declared themselves being of South American, Central American or Caribbean ancestry (either alone or in combination with one other ancestry).

Until 2006, Chile was the country that had contributed the largest proportion of immigrants to Australia. In the 2006 Census 23,305 Australian residents declared they were born in Chile. Other Hispanic or Latin American countries include El Salvador (18,000), Spain (12,276), Argentina (11,369), Uruguay (9,376), Brazil (6,647), Peru (6,322), Colombia (5,706), and Ecuador (1,356). But in the 2011 Census, Brazil became the largest source of immigrants of Latin American origin in Australia, with a total of 14,509 Brazil-born people living in the country, leaving Chile in second place. 4,872 were born in Mexico in 2016.

== Distribution ==
Sydney is home to the largest proportion of Hispanic and Latin American Australians - 66% of Uruguay-born, 62% of Peru-born, 47% each of Chile-born and Colombia-born, and 42% of Brazilian-born respondents at the 2006 Census were residing in Sydney. Persons from El Salvador however have different settlement patterns - only 18% were residing in Sydney, while 32% were in Melbourne and 21% were in Brisbane.

As of 2019, there are approximately 7,420 Mexican-born people living in Australia.

== Culture ==
=== Cuisine ===
Food is one area in which the Hispanic world has influenced cuisine in Australia. Mexican foods are especially popular. The taco, a folded tortilla filled with meat, cheese and other ingredients. Other Hispanic dishes, such as enchiladas, tamales, tostadas and empanadas are also served in many Hispanic-themed restaurants.

== Notable Hispanic and Latin American Australians ==
There have been many distinguished Hispanic and Latin American Australians, in sports, the arts, politics and other areas. These include:

Film and Television

- Alyssa Alano, actress and model (Spanish biological father)
- Jacob Elordi, actor (Basque descent)
- Adam Garcia, actor
- Kat Hoyos, actress
- Nathalie Kelley, actress
- Miguel Maestre, restaurateur and television presenter - co-host lifestyle television series The Living Room
- Glenn McMillan, actor
- Pia Miller, actress, model and presenter
- Elsa Pataky, actress
- Nathalia Ramos, actress
- Lyndsey Rodrigues, television host
- Adriana Xenides, former game show host

Music

- Maya Jupiter, musician
- Styalz Fuego, producer
- Holly Valance, singer

Other

- Carmen Novoa, artist and writer
- Rosendo Salvado, abbot of New Norcia
- Telmo Languiller, politician

Sport

- Peggy Antonio, cricketer
- Mariafe Artacho del Solar, Olympic volleyballer
- Carlos Blanco, rugby union player
- Raul Blanco, soccer coach
- Alex Brosque, soccer player
- Adrian Caceres, soccer player
- Nick Carle, soccer player
- Josh Cordoba, rugby league player
- Bruno Fornaroli, soccer player
- Juan Manuel Fuentes, cyclist
- Richard Garcia, soccer player
- Indi Hartwell, professional wrestler
- Hector Lombard, Mixed Martial Arts fighter
- Héritier Lumumba, Australian rules footballer
- Gabriel Mendez, soccer player
- Alex de Minaur, tennis player
- Richard Porta, soccer player and 2010 runner-up at MasterChef Celebrity in Montevideo
- Reinaldo, soccer player
- Jose Romero, Australian rules footballer
- Isaías Sánchez, soccer player and captain of Adelaide United in the A-League from 2017 to 2019
- Dion Valle, soccer player
- Rodrigo Vargas, soccer player

== See also ==
- African Australians
- American Australians
- Arab Australians
- Asian Australians
- Black Australians
- Caribbean and West Indian Australians
- European Australians
- Indigenous Australians
- North African and Middle Eastern Australians
- Argentine Australians
- Brazilian Australians
- Chilean Australians
- Colombian Australians
- Demography of Australia
- European Australians
- Europeans in Oceania
- Hispanic diaspora
- Immigration to Australia
- Peruvian Australians
- Salvadoran Australians
- Spanish Australians
- Uruguayan Australians
