= Argentina–Australia bilateral treaties =

International law treaties

The following is a list of international bilateral treaties between Argentina and Australia

- Early treaties were extended to Australia by the British Empire, however they are still generally in force.

Entry into force	Topic	Title	Ref
1825	Trade	Treaty of Amity, Commerce and Navigation between the United Kingdom of Great Britain and Ireland and the United Provinces of Rio de la Plata [Argentina] (Buenos Aires, 2 February 1825)	
1889	Extradition	Treaty between the United Kingdom of Great Britain and Ireland and the Argentine Republic for the Mutual Extradition of Fugitive Criminals (Buenos Aires, 22 May 1889)	
1990	Extradition	Treaty on Extradition between the Government of Australia and the Government of the Republic of Argentina	
1993	Criminal law	Treaty between the Government of Australia and the Government of the Argentine Republic on Mutual Assistance in Criminal Matters	
1997	Trade	Agreement between the Government of Australia and the Government of the Argentine Republic on the Promotion and Protection of Investments, and Protocol	
1999	Taxation	Agreement between the Government of Australia and the Government of the Argentine Republic for the Avoidance of Double Taxation and the Prevention of Fiscal Evasion with respect to Taxes on Income, and Protocol	
2005	Nuclear energy	Agreement Between Australia and the Argentine Republic Concerning Cooperation in the Peaceful Uses of Nuclear Energy (Canberra, 8 August 2001)	
