= Eduardo Villagra =

Chilean footballer (born 1990)

Personal information
- Full name: Eduardo Ignacio Villagra Cabezas
- Date of birth: 11 June 1990 (age 36)
- Place of birth: Santiago, Chile
- Height: 1.78 m (5 ft 10 in)
- Position: Defender

Youth career
- 2005–2010: Universidad Católica

Senior career*
Years	Team	Apps	(Gls)
2009–2014	Universidad Católica	3	(0)
2009	→ San Luis de Quillota (loan)	1	(0)
2011	→ Deportes Puerto Montt (loan)	1	(0)
2013	→ Deportes Puerto Montt (loan)	19	(0)
2013–2014	→ Deportes Naval (loan)	5	(0)
2014–2015	San Antonio Unido	2	(0)
- * Club domestic league appearances and goals as of 7 February 2013 ‡ National team caps and goals as of 15 November 2008

Eduardo Ignacio Villagra Cabezas (born 11 June 1990), is a Chilean footballer.

== Titles ==
Season	Club	Title
Torneo 2010	Universidad Católica	Primera División de Chile
