= R. G. Menzies House =

Headquarters of the Australian Federal Liberal Party

- Building name at front

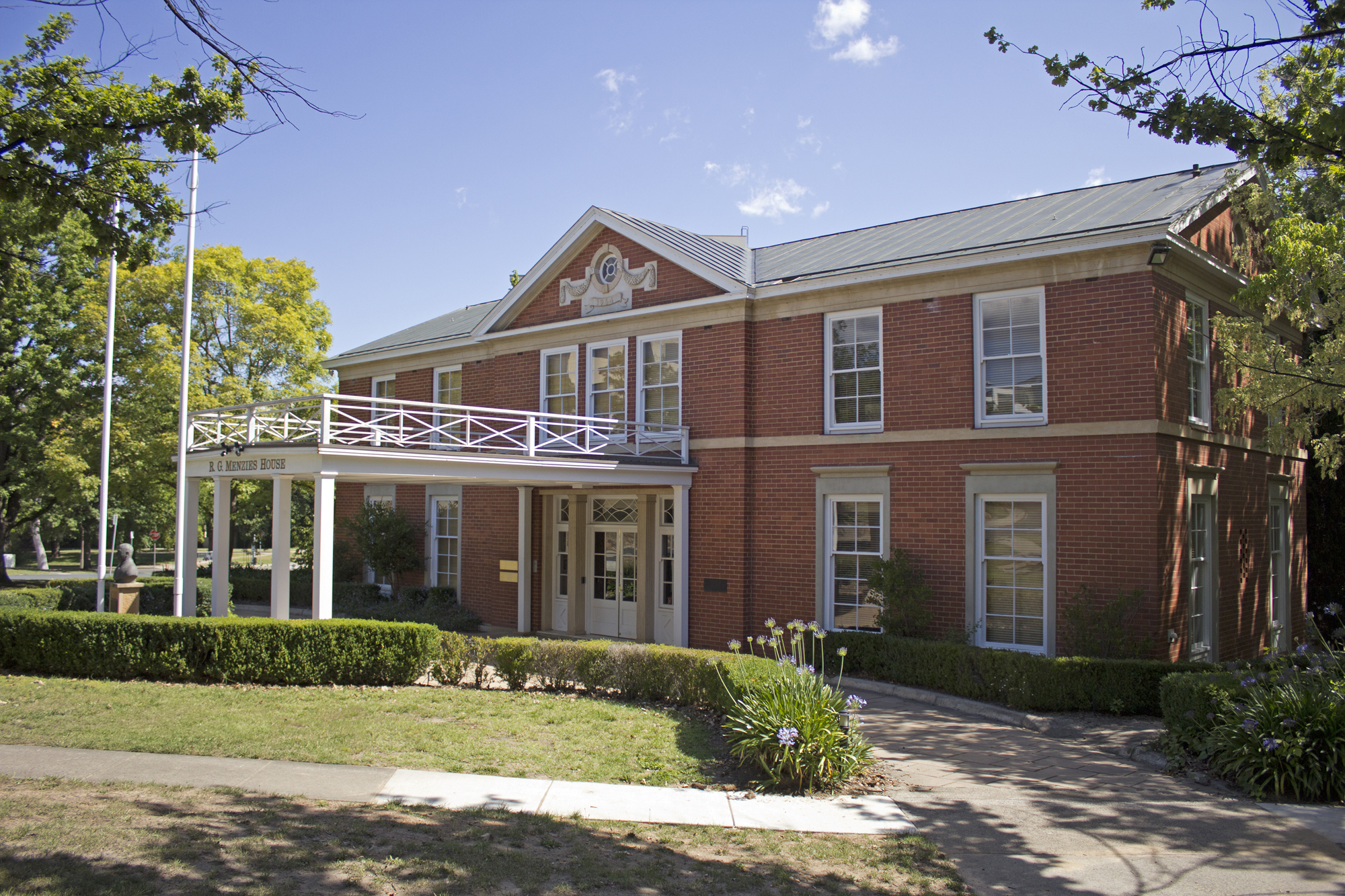
- R. G. Menzies House viewed from north-west of the building
- Alternative names: Menzies House, Liberal Party HQ, Menzies Research Centre

General information
- Location: Barton, Canberra, Australian Capital Territory, 59 Blackall St, Barton, ACT 2600
- Coordinates: 35°18′30.2256″S 149°8′5.7948″E
- Named for: Robert Menzies
- Opened: 9 November 1965; 24 June 1994
- Renovated: 1994
- Cost: $65,000 (equivalent to $1,981,919 in 2022) (Note: Original currency used was the AU£.)
- Renovation cost: $1,500,000 (equivalent to $3,073,641 in 2022)
- Owner: Liberal Party

Height
- Architectural: Georgian

Technical details
- Floor count: 2

The R. G. Menzies House, also known colloquially as Liberal Headquarters, or simply Menzies House, is the official headquarters of the Australian Federal Liberal Party. It is also home to the party's think tank, the Menzies Research Centre. It was built in the Georgian architectural style and is described as a "two-floored, red-brick house." It is located in the Canberra suburb of Barton, less than a kilometre from Parliament House.

The building was reported to have cost AU£65,000 and was opened by then-prime minister Robert Menzies on 9 November 1965. Headquarters for the Federal Liberal Party, it currently houses the "Federal Secretariat" of the party and staff of the Menzies Research Centre. After renovation in 1994 the building was re-opened by Robert Menzies' wife Pattie and had its name changed to R. G. Menzies House. The revamped building cost AU$1.5 million.

At the entrance front of the building is a bust of Menzies. The bust was sculpted by Melbourne sculptor V. E. Greenhalgh.

== Gallery ==
Images of the building and surroundings
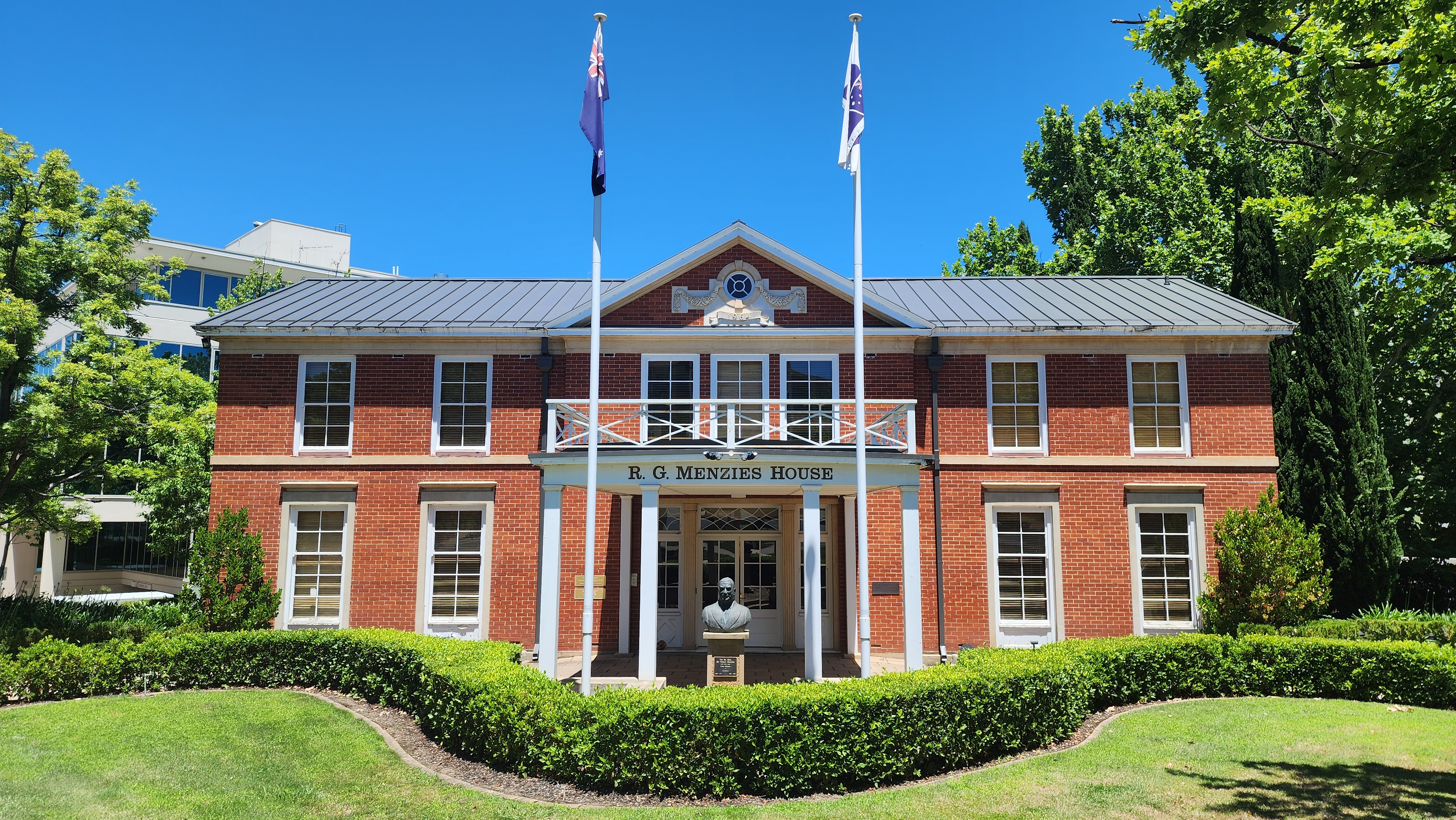
Front Facade

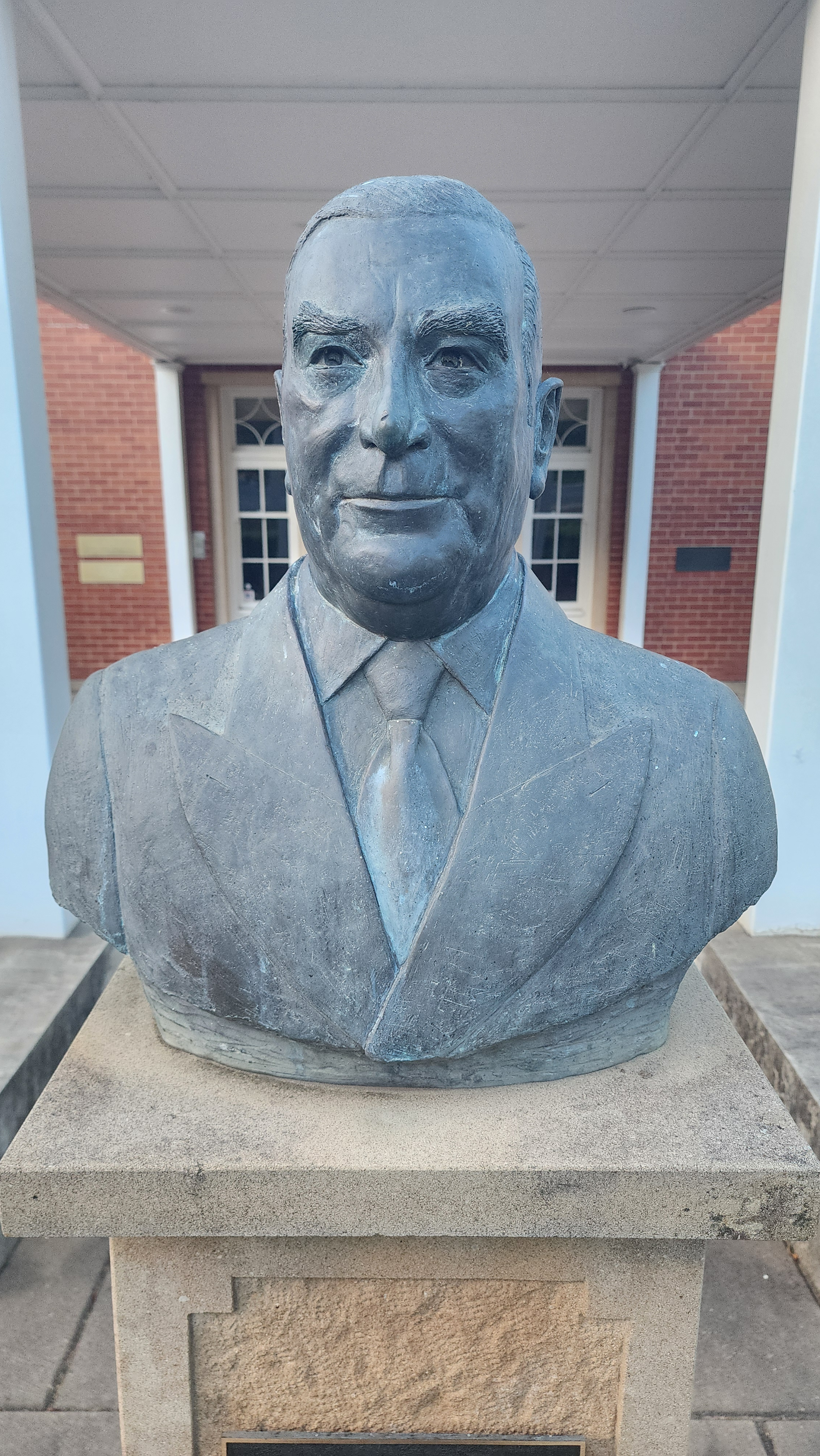
Menzies bust, at front of building

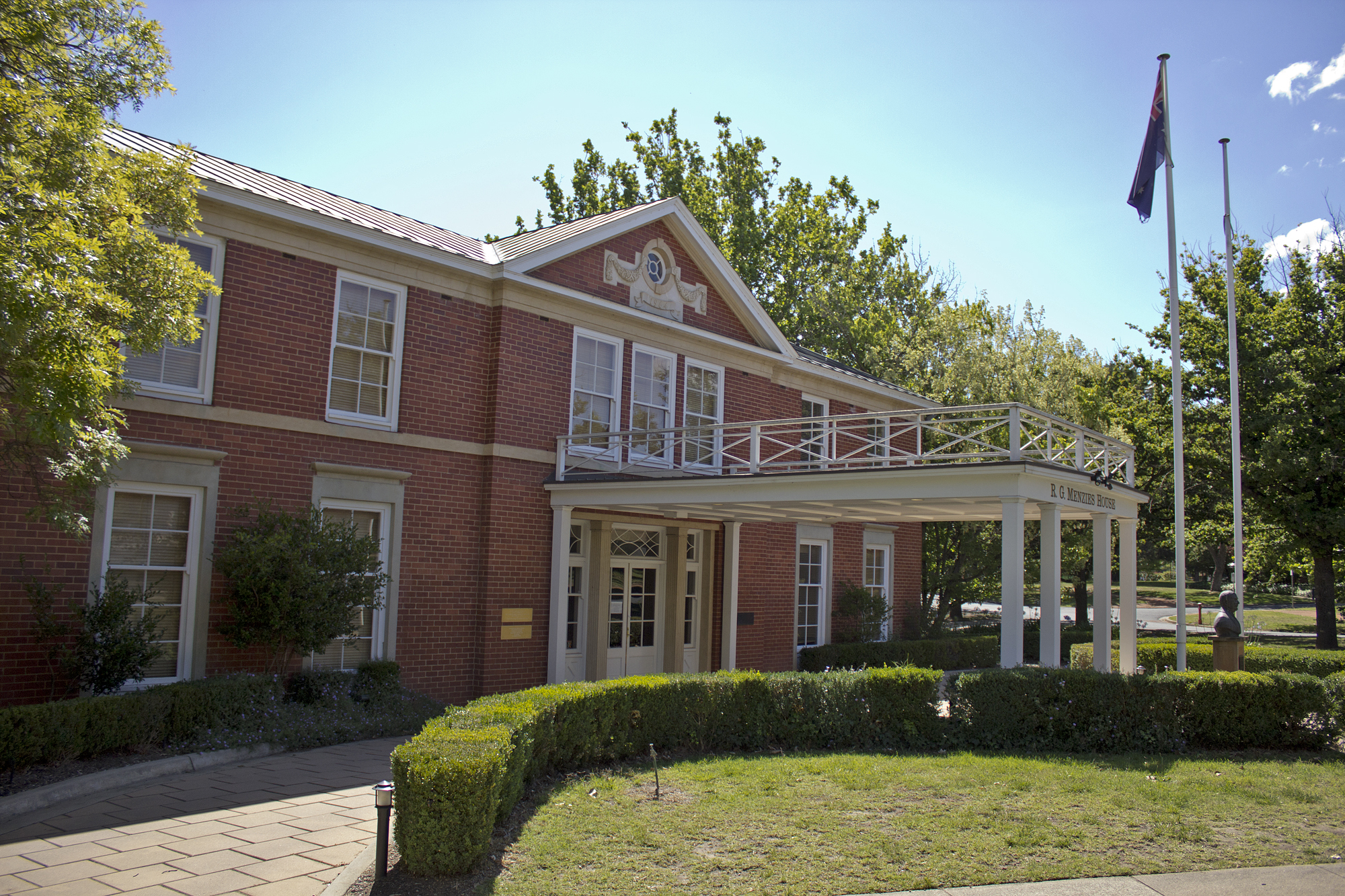
Front facade, view from north-east
