= Australia–Uruguay relations =

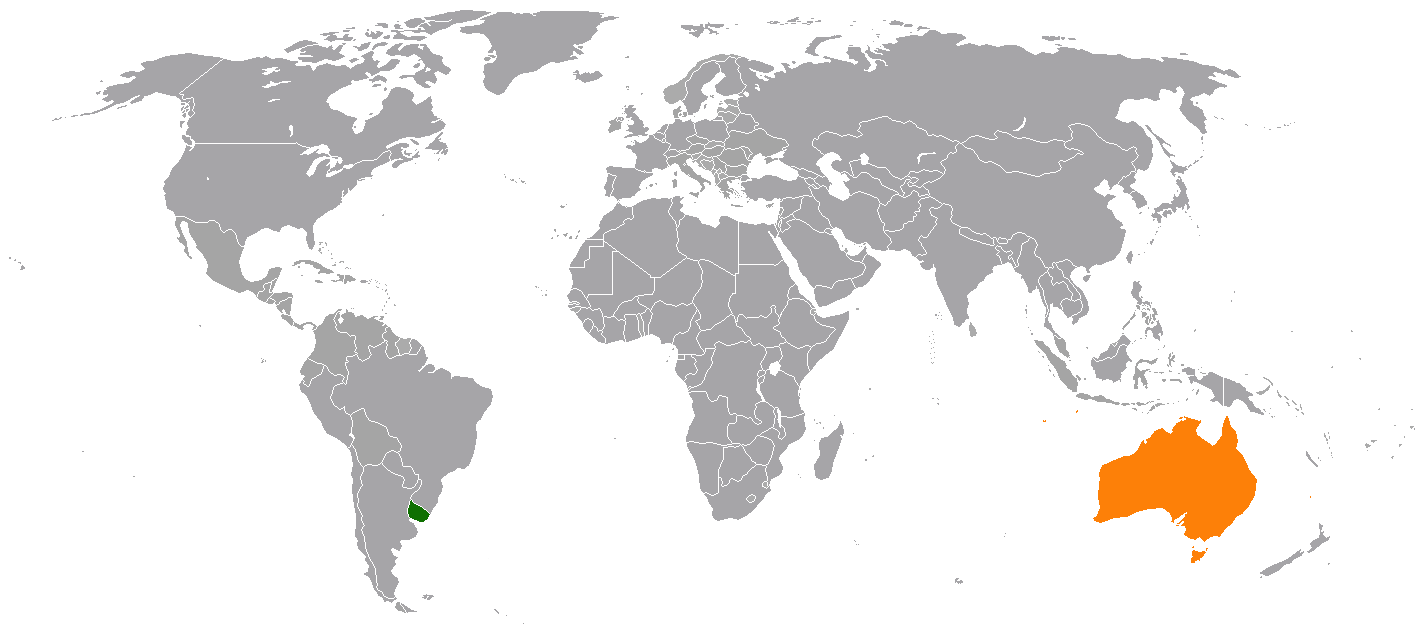

- Uruguay: Australia

Australia and Uruguay have had consular relations since 1923 and diplomatic relations since 1948. Australia is represented in Uruguay through its embassy in Buenos Aires (Argentina). Uruguay has an embassy in Canberra a consulate general in Sydney.

In 2023, Australia and Uruguay will celebrate the 100th anniversary of consular relations and the 75th anniversary of diplomatic relations.

The countries have a history of economic cooperation in establishing the General Agreement on Tariffs and Trade, the World Trade Organization, and the Cairns Group. The countries also cooperate on Antarctic science and conservation within the Antarctic Treaty System and the Convention on the Conservation of Marine Living Resources. The countries' cooperation in research and development in the agricultural sector is propelled by their similar export-oriented agricultural sectors.

== Cooperation prior to official relations ==
From the early 20th century, Australia and Uruguay cooperated to improve their agricultural practices. In 1912, a party of agricultural engineers from the University of Montevideo were received by representatives from the Australian Department of Agriculture to exchange knowledge on agricultural practices. Australia and Uruguay exchanged information on weather patterns during the 1930s through Uruguay's Sydney Consulate. In 1947, the countries' governments began negotiating the export of Australian merino sheep to Uruguay. In 1955, Australia gifted technical films on sheep health to Uruguay's Sydney Consulate. In 1956, Uruguay became the first country in South America to import Australian merinos.

Relations were strengthened further in the 1960s and 1970s when stagnating economic growth in Uruguay reduced opportunities for the highly educated population, leading to an exodus of skilled migrants. Many Uruguayans came to settle in Australia, encouraged by an Australian official program which aimed to recruit Uruguayan workers. The Uruguayan-born population in Australia has remained relatively stable, with the 2021 Australian census recording 9,205 Uruguayans living in Australia compared to 9,690 recorded 30 years ago.

== Consular relations ==
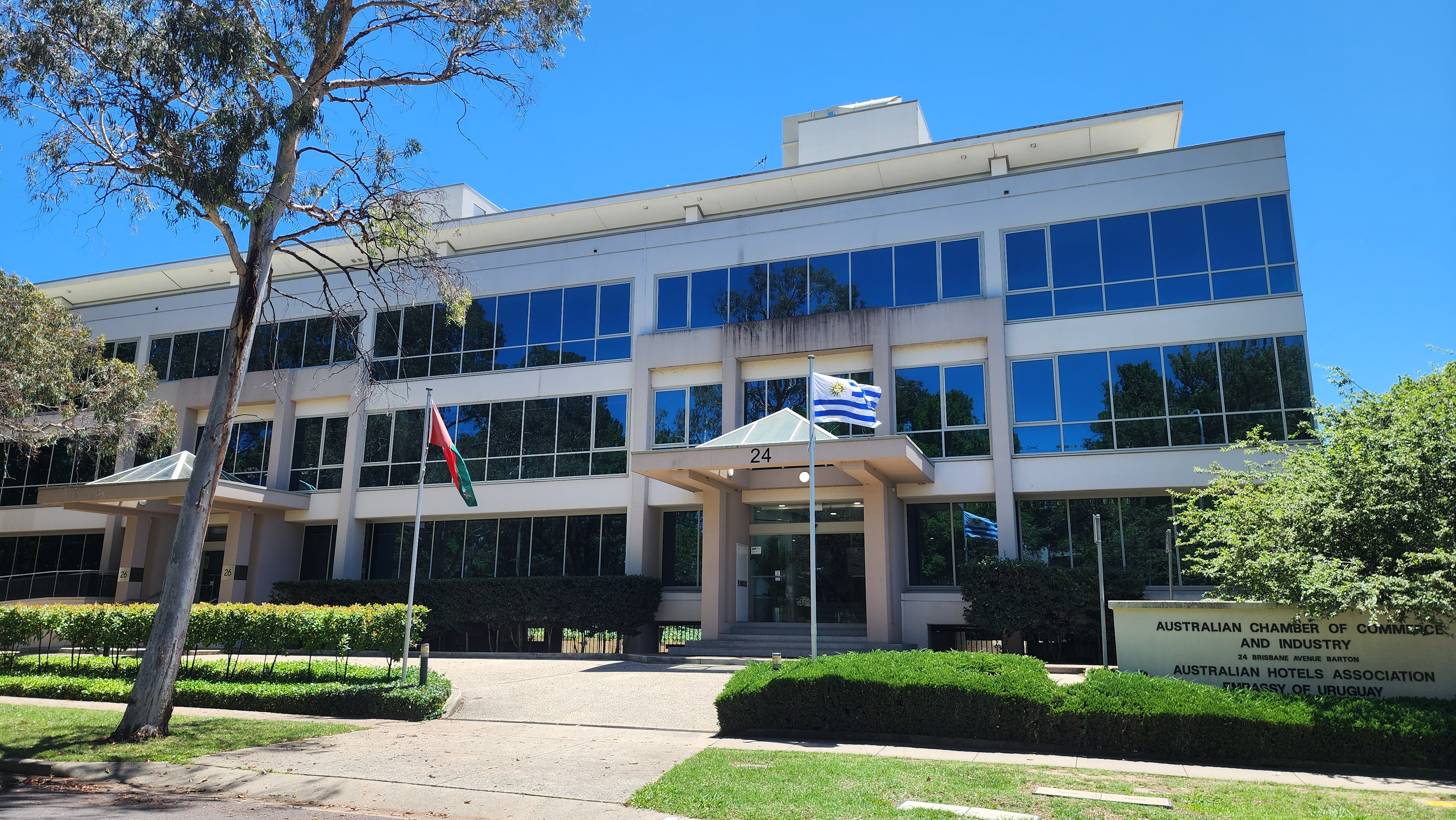
Embassy of Uruguay in Barton, Australian Capital Territory

Consular relations between Australia and Uruguay were established on 20 September 1923. In August of that year, the foreign minister of Uruguay applied to the secretary of state for the colonies in London to appoint an honorary consul of Uruguay at Sydney. In September of that year, the governor-general of Australia recognised Norman Charles Nelson as honorary consul at Sydney, officially establishing consular relations with Uruguay.

Uruguay's first consulate was opened in Sydney on 15 March 1924, when Norman Charles Nelson received an Exequatur with the King's signature authorising him to act as consul.

Uruguay's second consulate was opened in Melbourne on 4 March 1947, headed by Consul Herbert Percy Ogilvie.

Uruguay currently has a general consulate in Sydney.

== Diplomatic relations ==
Diplomatic relations between Australia and Uruguay were established on 15 December 1948 via an exchange of diplomatic notes between the two governments.

Uruguay established its first diplomatic mission, the Legation of Uruguay in Canberra, on 15 May 1958. A legation is a low-level diplomatic mission headed by a resident minister rather than a career diplomat, and was the most common form of diplomatic mission at the time. Washington Rios, who was Uruguay's consul-general in Sydney at the time, was appointed chargé d'affaires of the legation in Canberra.

On 28 June 1968, Uruguay elevated the level of its diplomatic mission in Canberra to an embassy – the highest level of diplomatic representation. Four years prior, the Uruguayan Government had expressed its desire to raise the rank of its diplomatic mission in Canberra with the expectation that Australia would also elevate its mission in Montevideo to an embassy. However, Australia did not raise the level of its Montevideo mission in 1968. In July of that year, Australia's ambassador to Argentina gained non-resident accreditation to Uruguay, enabling Australia's Embassy in Buenos Aires to manage diplomatic relations with Uruguay. This system is maintained today, with Australia represented by an Honorary Consulate in Montevideo.

== Economic relations ==
Australia and Uruguay advocate for the reduction and elimination of subsidies and tariffs in international agricultural trade. The countries have had friendly cooperation on this issue throughout their relationship and were instrumental in the establishment of several international economic institutions. Both countries were instrumental in the establishment of the General Agreement on Tariffs and Trade (GATT). The Uruguay Round of GATT negotiations was responsible for establishing the World Trade Organization. During the Uruguay Round, Australia and Uruguay co-founded the Cairns Group. In 1970, Uruguay joined the International Wool Secretariat, composed of founding members Australia, New Zealand and South Africa.

Monthly value of Uruguayan merchandise exports to Australia (A$ millions) since 1988.

In 2015, total bilateral trade was A$29.6 million and Uruguay ranked 109th as a trading partner of Australia.

In the late 1990s, the major exports from Uruguay to Australia were leather, furskins, pearls and gems, and leather goods. In that period Australia primarily exported wool, iron, steel, and beef to Uruguay. In 2010 Uruguay investigated the possibility of importing Merino semen and embryos to reinvigorate their sheep industry after substantial declines.

Australian investment in Uruguay centres on mining, agriculture, and entertainment, and benefits from the lack of obstacle to repatriation of profits.

Although eucalypts are native to Australia, they form the basis for 80% of the Uruguayan forestry industry.

Monthly value of Australian merchandise exports to Uruguay (A$ millions) since 1988.

== Resident diplomatic missions ==
- Australia is accredited to Uruguay from its embassy in Buenos Aires, Argentina.
- Uruguay has an embassy in Canberra.

== See also ==
- Foreign relations of Australia
- Foreign relations of Uruguay
- Uruguayan Australians
