= Australia–Colombia bilateral treaties =

The following is a list of international bilateral treaties between Australia and Colombia

- Early treaties were extended to Australia by the British Empire, however they are still generally in force.

Entry into force	Topic	Title	Ref
1825	Trade	Treaty of Amity, Commerce and Navigation between the United Kingdom of Great Britain and Ireland and Colombia, and Additional Article (Bogota, 18 April 1825)	
1866	Trade	Treaty of Friendship, Commerce and Navigation between the United Kingdom of Great Britain and Ireland and Colombia (London, 16 February 1866)	
1888	Extradition	Treaty between the United Kingdom of Great Britain and Ireland and Colombia for the Mutual Surrender of Fugitive Criminals (Bogota, 27 October 1888)	
1908	Arbitration	Agreement between the United Kingdom of Great Britain and Ireland and Colombia providing for the Settlement by Arbitration of Certain Classes of Questions which may arise between the Two Governments	
1912	Trade	Protocol between the United Kingdom of Great Britain and Ireland and Colombia respecting the Application to certain parts of the British Dominions of the Treaty of Friendship, Commerce and Navigation of 16 February 1866	
1930	Extradition	Convention between the United Kingdom of Great Britain and Northern Ireland [and on behalf of Australia, New Zealand and South Africa] and the Republic of Colombia, supplementary to the Treaty for the Mutual Surrender of Fugitive Criminals of 27 October 1888	
