= Australia–Peru relations =

- Australia: Peru

Diplomatic mission
- Embassy of Australia, Lima: Embassy of Peru, Canberra

Australia–Peru relations refers to the diplomatic relations between the Commonwealth of Australia and the Republic of Peru. Both nations are members of Asia-Pacific Economic Cooperation, Cairns Group, Comprehensive and Progressive Agreement for Trans-Pacific Partnership, World Trade Organization and the United Nations.

== History ==
Both countries established relations on March 1, 1963, and have maintained them since. The ambassador of Peru to Australia was also accredited to New Zealand until an embassy was opened in Wellington, which closed in 2010 but reopened in 2019. The Australian Government first announced it would open an embassy in Lima in 1968, which closed between 1986 and 2010 as a result of the 1986 Australian Government Budget.

In 2006, Peruvian Australians were numbered at 5,500 people, as well as their families. According to a census carried in 2016 by Department of Home Affairs, 9,556 Australians were born in Peru, while 11,139 claimed Peruvian ancestry.

== High-level visits ==
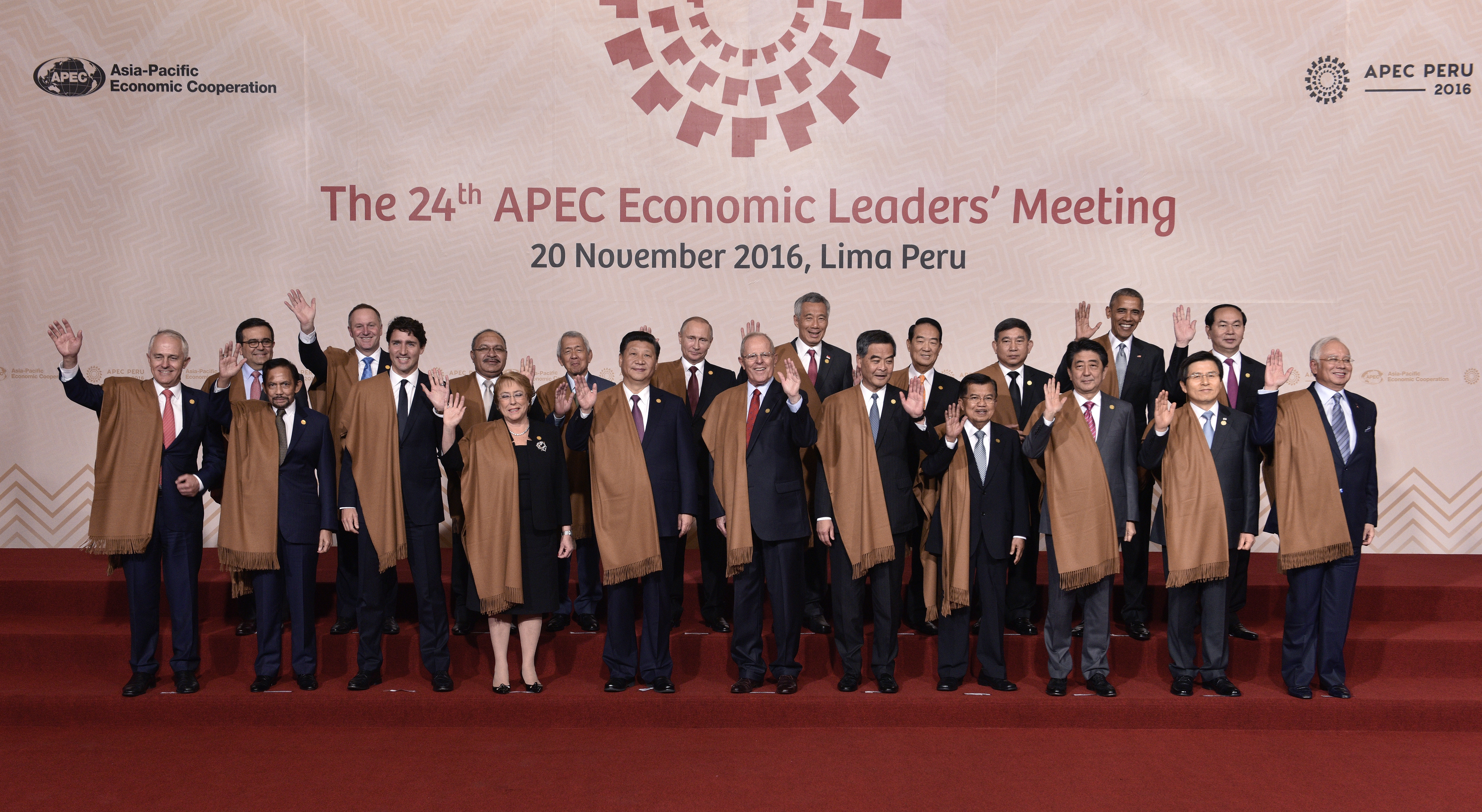
Australian Prime Minister Malcolm Turnbull attending the 28th APEC Summit hosted in Lima.

High-level visits from Australia to Peru

- Prime Minister Malcolm Turnbull (2016)
- Prime Minister Anthony Albanese (2024)

High-level visits from Peru to Australia

- President Alan García (2007)

== Trade ==
On February 12, 2018, the Free Trade Agreement between Peru and Australia was signed. On February 12, 2019, Peru ratified the Free Trade Agreement. Australia and Peru have a trade agreement with the Comprehensive and Progressive Agreement for Trans-Pacific Partnership that entered into force on September 19, 2021.

== Resident diplomatic missions ==
- Australia has an embassy in Lima and an honorary consulate in Cusco opened in 2023.
- Peru has an embassy in Canberra, a consulate-general in Sydney, and honorary consulates in Brisbane, Melbourne and Perth.
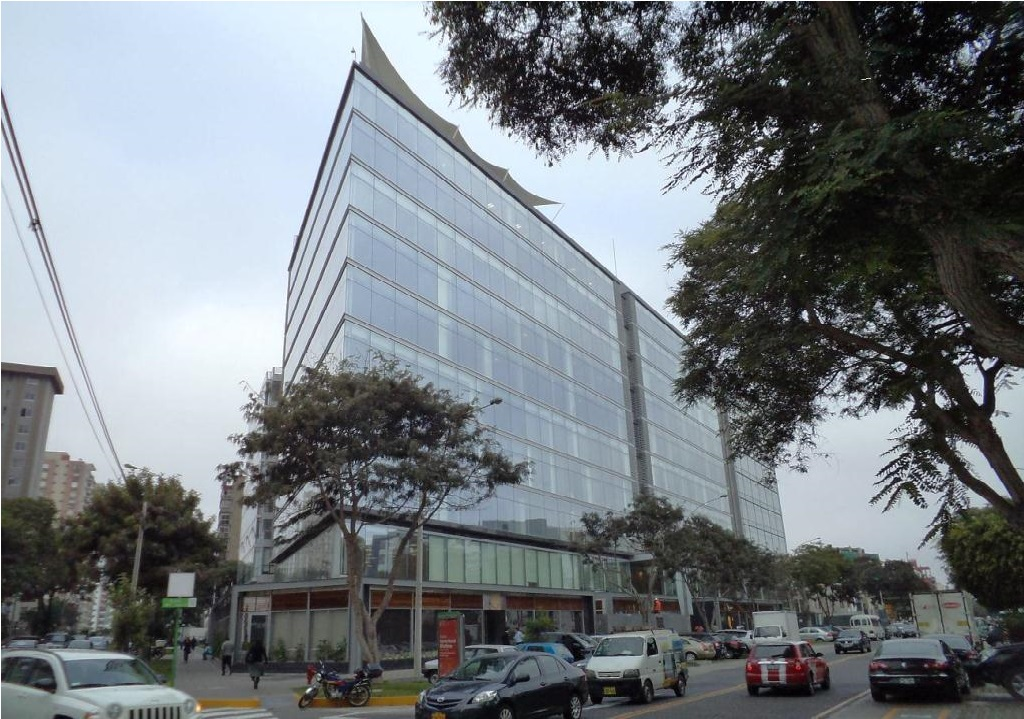
Embassy of Australia in Lima

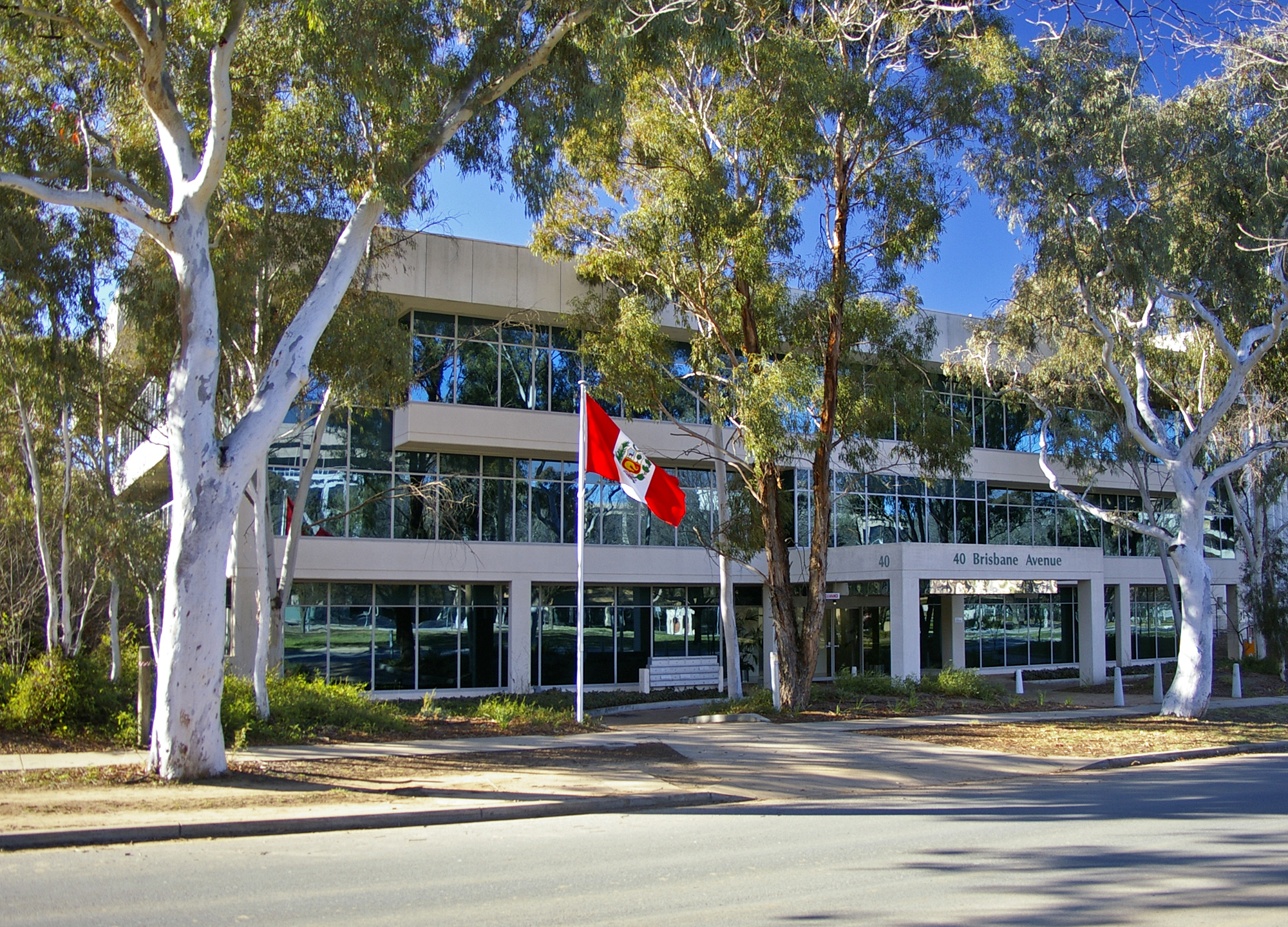
Embassy of Peru in Canberra

== See also ==
- Foreign relations of Australia
- Foreign relations of Peru
- List of ambassadors of Australia to Peru
- List of ambassadors of Peru to Australia
- Peruvian Australians
