= Solanum tuberosum Group Phureja =

Group of potato cultivars

Solanum tuberosum Group Phureja is a cultivar-group of diploid potato plants originating from the Andes in South America. The group differs from other potato cultivar-groups by the absence of dormant tubers. This means that the tuber immediately begins to grow once it is formed, without a resting period. This explains why the varieties of the group are to be planted in areas with a mild climate, where culture throughout the year is possible. By hybridization with Solanum tuberosum by the Scottish Crop Research Institute, varieties were obtained who are adapted to the European climate. These crossings are particularly popular as a culinary potato for their excellent taste.

"Cultivar-groups" are taxonomic categories used by the International Code of Nomenclature of Cultivated Plants (ICNCP) to associate cultivars (cultivated varieties) of plants with traits useful to farmers. The criteria used to distinguish potato cultivar-groups include non-morphological traits such as frost tolerance, tuber dormancy, daylength adaptation, and ploidy level.

== Description ==
Plants of the Phureja Group are ascending to erect, with pedicel articulation is evident below the upper 20% of the pedicel, and upper leaves diverge from stems at 40°-50°. They are adapted to short-day flowering and tuberization, and are generally not frost tolerant. They are diploid, and differentiated from the Stenotomum Group in that the tubers sprout at harvest in the Phureja Group.

== Taxonomy ==
Solanum phureja was originally described as a species in 1929 by Russian botanists Sergei Vasilievic Juzepczuk and Sergej (Sergei) Mikhailovich Bukasov. Bukasov had totally revised the systematic botany of potatoes in 1923. While the 20th century saw significant controversy over the species status of S. andigenum and S. tuberosum, and which gave rise to modern potato cultivars, different classifications until 2002 typically agreed with treating S. phureja as a separate species. An exception was K. S. Dodds and G. J. Paxman, who in 1962 suggested it be included as one of five cultivar-groups of S. tuberosum, Group Phureja, based this on a number of factors, particularly poor morphological separation of cultivated diploid species. There were also published descriptions and proposals of several subspecies, varieties, and forms of S. phureja have been that were published.

A 2002 reclassification by Huaman and Spooner found little phenetic support for the then-mainstream treatment of S. phureja as a species. They reclassified all cultivated potatoes as a single species, S. tuberosum, divided into eight cultivar-groups, including a Phureja Group. At that time, the mainstream, but not universally accepted, classification had been from Hawkes 1990, which recognized three subspecies of S. phureja: S. phureja Juz. and Bukasov subsp. phureja, S. phureja subsp. estradae (López) Hawkes, and S. phureja subsp. hygrothermicum (Ochoa) Hawkes.

A 2011 summary of the issue said that the species of Hawkes 1990 should be treated as groups arising under domestication was by then generally accepted.
