= Australia–El Salvador bilateral treaties =

The following is a list of international bilateral treaties between Australia and El Salvador

- Early treaties were extended to Australia by the British Empire, however they are still generally in force.

Entry into force	Topic	Title	Ref
1862	Trade	Treaty of Friendship, Commerce and Navigation between the United Kingdom of Great Britain and Ireland and El Salvador (Guatemala, 24 October 1862) (London, 23 January-26 February-10-21 April 1863)	
1862	Trade	Agreement between the United Kingdom of Great Britain and Ireland and El Salvador prolonging the Treaty of Friendship, Commerce and Navigation of 24 October 1862 (San Salvador, 23 June 1886)	
1881	Extradition	Treaty between the United Kingdom of Great Britain and Ireland and El Salvador for the Mutual Surrender of Fugitive Criminals (Paris, 23 June 1881)	
1930	Extradition	Exchange of Notes between the Government of United Kingdom of Great Britain and Northern Ireland [and on behalf of the Government of Australia, New Zealand and South Africa] and the Government of Republic of Salvador extending to certain Mandated Territories the Treaty for the Mutual Surrender of Fugitive Criminals of 23 June 1881	
