= Argentine Australians =

Argentine Australians Argentino-Australiano
Total population
- Argentine; 9,879 (by ancestry, 2011 Census); 2011 Census).

Regions with significant populations
- New South Wales: 5,737
- Victoria: 3,640
- Queensland: 1,223

Languages
- Australian English · Rioplatense Spanish · Italian

Religion
- Predominately Roman Catholic · Protestant · Jewish

Related ethnic groups
- Italians · Spaniards · Germans · Irish · Welsh · English • Slavs · Ashkenazi Jews · South Americans

Argentine Australians (Spanish: Argentinos Australiano) are Australian citizens of Argentine descent or birth. According to the Census there were 9,879 Australians who claimed full or partial Argentine ancestry and 20,940 Argentina-born citizens who were residing in Australia at the moment of the census.

== Demographics ==
According to the Australian census 11,985 Australians were born in Argentina while 9,875 claimed Argentine ancestry, either alone or with another ancestry.

== History and cultural background ==
Immigration from Argentina to Australia dates back to 1891, when the colonial census conducted that year recorded 25 Argentines living in Australia, indicating an old constant presence in the country. The Argentine community remained small and there wasn't much immigration from the South American country until many years later. In 1947, there were 249 Argentina-born people residing in Australia and by 1971 the number had increased to 1,805.

Argentine immigration since the 1970s reflected Argentina's economic difficulties and political instability. Between January 1974 and mid-1985, 6,572 Argentines immigrated to Australia and most are assisted immigrants rather than political refugees. Over 80% of Argentine immigrants to Australia between 1974 and 1982 received Australian Government assistance to immigrate.

Most Argentine Australians live in Sydney and Melbourne.

== Notable people ==
- Nathalie Kelley, actress

== See also ==
- Argentina–Australia relations
- Argentine Americans
- Argentine British
- Argentines of European descent
- Demographics of Argentina
- Demographics of Australia
- European Australians
- Europeans in Oceania
- Immigration to Australia
- Hispanic and Latin American Australians
