= Andrés Palomino =

Spanish webcomic creator (born 1978)

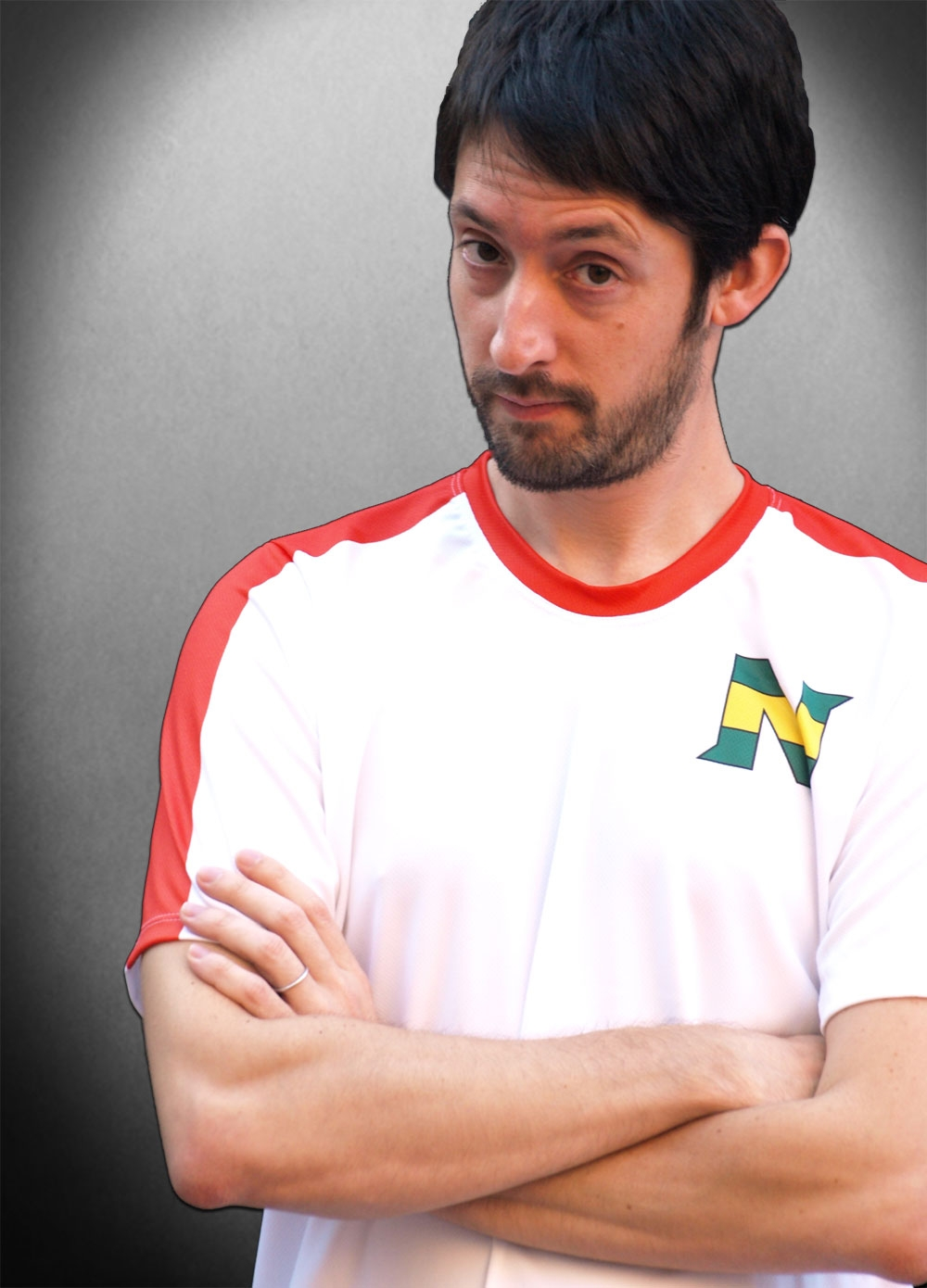
Andrés Palomino in 2014

Andrés Palomino Robles (born 1978, Barcelona) is a Spanish webcomic creator and screenwriter, best known for creating the webcomic Las Crónicas PSN.

== Career ==
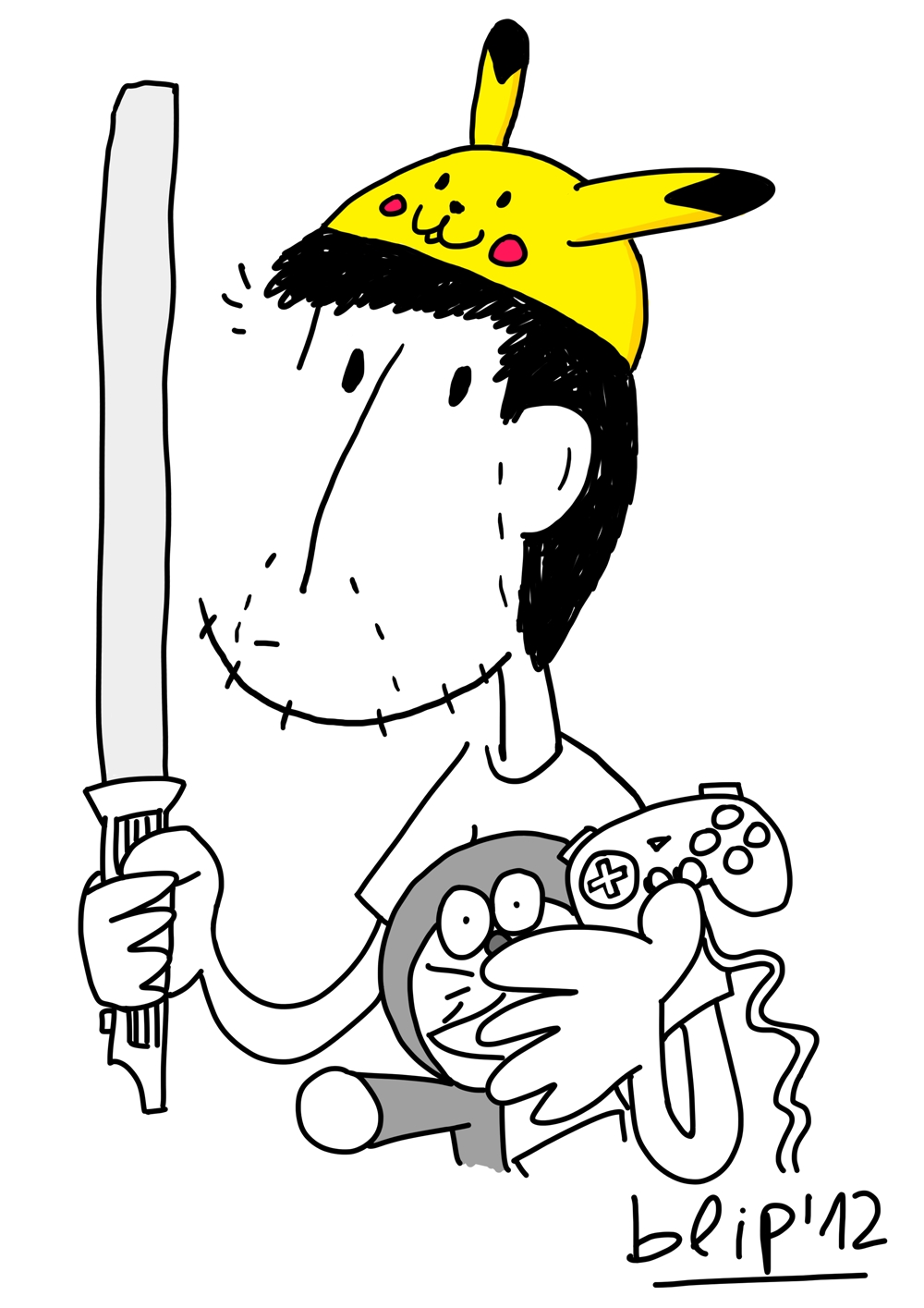
a cartoon drawn by Palomino in 2014

Palomino began working as a for Televisió de Catalunya in 2002, doing screenwriting for the Spanish children's TV show Club Super3.

Palomino began drawing and releasing his webcomic Las Crónicas PSN (The PSN Chronicles) on April 25, 2008. This webcomic tells the story of a group of 30-year-old fans of comic books, role playing games, and video games, in a humoristic and autobiographic tone. Between 2010 and 2011, Andrés published his comic strips on the online version of the Spanish newspaper 20 minutos. Since December 2008, he has compiled and self-edited Las Crónicas PSN to be published on paper. In May 2010 he joined the collective of webcomics authors Control Zeta, now conformed by Sergio Sánchez Morán, Xavier Àgueda, Koopa, Fadri, Zirta, Laurielle, Runtime-error, Defriki, Quetzal e Ismurg.

== Comic-book compilations ==
- Crónicas PSN vol. 1 (November 2008)
- Crónicas PSN vol. 2: ¡A pelo! (December 2009)
- Crónicas PSN vol. 3: Orgullo Friki (June 2010)
- Crónicas PSN vol. 4: 400 Gólems (April 2011)
- Crónicas PSN vol. 5: Tiago Desencadenado (December 2011)
- Crónicas PSN vol. 6: Horchata Gran Reserva (April 2013)
- Clásicos Crónicas PSN (October 2014)
- Manual para padres frikis: Año 0 (March 2014)

== Collaborations ==
- Fan Letal Vintage, with Cels Piñol (Panini Cómics, 2011)
- ¡Caramba!, fanzine coordinated and edited by Manuel Bartual (2011)
- Ella siempre me quiso por mi cerebro, with Julio Videras and Isaac Casanova (Diábolo Ediciones, 2011)
- Weezine 3 (fanzine, 2010)
- Reservoir Sheeps (fanzine, 2010)
- La guarida del leviatán, with Julio Videras and Isaac Casanova (Diábolo Ediciones, 2009)
- Cómics 2.0. Antología del webcómic 2009, edited by David Prieto (2009)
