= Sergio Villagra =

Australian rules football goal umpire (born 1973)

Sergio Rodrigo Villagra (born 11 October 1973) is an Australian rules football goal umpire who has officiated in the Australian Football League since 2002.

== Early life ==
Villagra immigrated to Australia with his family from Chile during the Pinochet regime. The family settled in the west of Sydney.

== Umpiring ==
After watching his first Australian Football League match, between the Sydney Swans and Fremantle at the Sydney Cricket Ground, in 1995 he developed a fascination with the goal umpires, who at the time wore white hats.

In 1999 he decided to become a goal umpire, joining one of his local leagues. By the 2002 AFL season he had joined the AFL umpiring panel. In Round 4, 2002 he made his AFL umpiring debut at the Sydney Cricket Ground in a match between the Sydney Swans and the Kangaroos.

As of Round 19 of the 2009 AFL season he had umpired in 79 AFL matches.

Villagra has twice been awarded the Michael Heinrichs Award for best goal umpire by the New South Wales Australian Football Umpires Association. He has officiated in over 100 senior matches in the Sydney AFL competition.
