= Rodrigo Palomino =

Spanish-born Australian soccer player

Personal information
- Full name: José Ángel Rodrigo Palomino Ortiz
- Date of birth: 22 July 1973 (age 53)
- Place of birth: Alicante, Spain
- Position: Forward

Senior career*
| Years | Team | Apps | (Gls) |
| 1993 | Granville Waratah | | |
| 1994 | Belmore Hercules | | |
| 1994–1995 | KSV Waregem | 5 | (1) |
| 1995–1996 | RC Tournai | 2 | (0) |
| 1996–1997 | Wawel Kraków | | |
| 1997–1999 | Royal Racing Club Touraisien | 49 | (2) |
| 2000–2004 | Francs Borains | 70 | (5) |
- * Club domestic league appearances and goals

José Ángel Rodrigo Palomino Ortiz (born 22 July 1973) is an Australian former soccer player who played as a forward, spending nine years in Belgium.

== Career ==
Palomino played in Australia for Granville Waratah, Belmore Hercules and in Belgium for KSV Waregem, RC Tournai, Wawel Kraków in Poland and Royal Racing Club Touraisien and Francs Borains in Belgium again.

== Personal life ==
He was born in Spain to Chilean parents and is of Australian heritage.
