= Brazilian Australians =

Ethnic group in Australia

Brazilian Australians Brasileiro-australiano
Total population
- Brazilian 56,610 (Brazilian Consulate) 46,720 (by birth, 2021 Census); 24,377 (by ancestry, 2021 Census)

Regions with significant populations
- New South Wales: 18,373
- Queensland: 5,626
- Victoria: 5,427
- Western Australia: 4,293
- South Australia: 2,025

Languages
- Portuguese, English, Porglish, Indigenous Brazilian languages, other European languages (German, Venetian, Polish, etc.) and Asian languages (Japanese, Arabic, etc.)

Religion
- Christianity (Roman Catholicism, mainly nominal numbers, and some Protestantism, mostly Evangelical and Pentecostal), but also a minority of Spiritism and others

Related ethnic groups
- Brazilian people, Hispanic and Latin American Australians, Portuguese Australians, Brazilian British, Brazilian Canadians, Brazilian Americans

Brazilian Australians (Portuguese: Brasileiro-Australiano) refers to Australian citizens of Brazilian birth or descent.

According to the 2021 Census, 46,720 people in Australia were born in Brazil while 24,377 claimed Brazilian ancestry.

According to the Brazilian consulate, almost 60,000 Brazilians are living in Australia as of 2020 (making around 0.25% of the country's population).

== Brazilian immigration ==
Although Brazilian migration in the eighteenth and nineteenth and centuries has not been documented, there is evidence of early Brazilian interest in Australia. However, concrete evidence of a Brazilian presence in Australia does not appear until the turn of the twentieth century, when census officials in 1901 counted 105 Brazilian-born in Australia.

=== Two waves of immigration ===
The first Brazilian migrants began arriving in Australia in the mid-1970s. They were attracted to Australia by an Australian government assistance scheme. The second wave of migration began in the late 1990s and continues today. It is widely attributed to growing socio-economic power within Brazil since the 1980s and Brazilians’ strong desire to learn English. Australia has become the third most popular destination for Brazilians to learn English after the United States and England.

There has also been an influx of Brazilian students who have come to attend Australian colleges and universities. These students come independent of their families on study visa. Some go home after completion of their studies, while others settle in Australia permanently. Brazilians have become the largest source of international student enrollments in Australia outside of Europe and Asia.

== Demographics and statistics ==
As of the 2021 Census, there are approximately 46,720 people in Australia who were born in Brazil, and around 24,377 people who claimed Brazilian ancestry, making the total number of people with Brazilian connections in Australia approximately 71,097.

Brazil is a country home to various ethnic and racial groups, but the largest ancestries reported in the 2021 census aside from the general 'Brazilian' response were Japanese, Italian, Lebanese, and Portuguese.

== Notable Brazilian Australians ==
- Agenor Muniz
- Aseem Pereira
- Raphael Borges Rodrigues – footballer for Melbourne City FC
- Cássio – former footballer for Adelaide United
- Caroline Correa
- David Harvey
- Angelina Kendall - fashion model
- Fernando de Moraes
- Glenn McMillan
- Gustavo Falciroli
- Henrique – former footballer for Brisbane Roar
- Heritier Lumumba – former Aussie Rules footballer for Collingwood FC
- Mineiro – former 24 time Brazil international
- Bernardo Oliveira – footballer for Adelaide United
- Wilson da Silva

== See also ==
- African Australians
- Australia–Brazil relations
- Brazilians in the United Kingdom
- Brazilian Americans
- Brazilian Canadians
- European Australians
- Europeans in Oceania
- Hispanic and Latin American Australians
- Immigration to Australia
- Portuguese Australians
