= List of Australian bilateral treaties =

This is a list of bilateral treaties entered into by Australia.

== Bilateral treaties on extradition and criminal matters ==
- List of Australian bilateral treaties on extradition and criminal matters

== Bilateral treaties on postal services and money orders ==
- List of Australian bilateral treaties on postal services and money orders

== Bilateral treaties on commerce, trade and arbitration ==
- List of Australian bilateral treaties on commerce, trade and arbitration

== Bilateral treaties on intellectual property ==
- List of Australian bilateral treaties on intellectual property

== Bilateral treaties by country ==
Country	Bilateral treaty link
Albania	Albania–Australia bilateral treaties
Argentina	Argentina–Australia bilateral treaties
Austria	Australia–Austria bilateral treaties
Belgium	Australia–Belgium bilateral treaties
Bolivia	Australia–Bolivia bilateral treaties
Brazil	Australia–Brazil bilateral treaties
Canada	Australia–Canada bilateral treaties
Chile	Australia–Chile bilateral treaties
Colombia	Australia–Colombia bilateral treaties
Cuba	Australia–Cuba bilateral treaties
Czech Republic	Australia–Czech Republic bilateral treaties
Denmark	Australia–Denmark bilateral treaties
Ecuador	Australia–Ecuador bilateral treaties
El Salvador	Australia–El Salvador bilateral treaties
Estonia	Australia–Estonia bilateral treaties
Finland	Australia–Finland bilateral treaties
France	Australia–France bilateral treaties
Germany	Australia–Germany bilateral treaties
Greece	Australia–Greece bilateral treaties
Guatemala	Australia–Guatemala bilateral treaties

== Pre-federation bilateral treaties ==
Bilateral treaties prior to federation signed by the British Empire, adopted by Australia, and active on or after federation:

- 1842 – Treaty between the United Kingdom of Great Britain and Ireland and the United States of America to Settle and Define the Boundaries between the Possessions of Her Britannic Majesty in North America and the Territories of the United States; for the Final Suppression of the African Slave Trade; and for the Giving up of Criminal Fugitives from Justice in certain cases [Webster-Ashburton Treaty] (Washington, 9 August 1842)
- 1854 – Agreement between the Government of the United Kingdom of Great Britain and Ireland and the Government of France relative to Merchant Seamen Deserters (London, 23 June 1854)
- 1856 – Convention between the United Kingdom of Great Britain and Ireland and the Netherlands for the Reciprocal Admission of Consuls of the One Party to the Colonies and Foreign Possessions of the Other (The Hague, 6 March 1856)
- 1869 – Declaration between the United Kingdom of Great Britain and Ireland and Denmark regarding Exemption from Forced Loans and Compulsory Military Service (Copenhagen, 14 June 1869)
- 1870 – Convention between the United Kingdom of Great Britain and Ireland and the United States of America relative to Naturalisation (London, 13 May 1870)
- 1871 – Convention between the United Kingdom of Great Britain and Ireland and the United States of America supplementary to the Convention relative to Naturalisation of 13 May 1870 (Washington, 23 February 1871)
- 1872 – Declaration between the Government of the United Kingdom of Great Britain and Ireland and the Federal Council of the Swiss Confederation relative to the Succession or Legacy Duties to be Levied on the Property of British Subjects dying in the Canton of Vaud or of Citizens of the Canton of Vaud dying in the British Dominions (Berne, 27 August 1872)
- 1875 – Agreement between the United Kingdom of Great Britain and Ireland and Greece relative to Merchant Seamen Deserters (Athens, 19 August 1875)
- 1877 – Declaration between the Government of the United Kingdom of Great Britain and Ireland and the Government of Italy relative to the Disposal of the Estates of Deceased Seamen of the Two Nations (London, 17 April 1877)
- 1879 – Agreement between the Government of the United Kingdom of Great Britain and Ireland and the Government of France for the Mutual Relief of Distressed Seamen (London, 5 November 1879)
- 1879 – Agreement between the Government of the United Kingdom of Great Britain and Ireland and the Government of Germany for the Mutual Relief of Distressed Seamen (London, 27 May 1879)
- 1879 – Agreement between the Government of the United Kingdom of Great Britain and Ireland and the Government of Germany relative to Merchant Seamen Deserters (London, 5 November 1879)
- 1880 – Agreement between the Government of the United Kingdom of Great Britain and Ireland and the Austro-Hungarian Government for the Mutual Relief of Distressed Seamen (London, 26 November 1880)
- 1881 – Agreement between the Government of the United Kingdom of Great Britain and Ireland and the Government of Denmark relative to Merchant Seamen Deserters (London, 21 June 1881)
- 1881 – Agreement between the Government of the United Kingdom of Great Britain and Ireland and the Government of Sweden and Norway for the Mutual Relief of Distressed Seamen (London, 12 July 1881)
- 1883 – Agreement between the United Kingdom of Great Britain and Ireland and Denmark for the Mutual Relief of Distressed Seamen (London, 25 July 1883)
- 1880 – Agreement between the Government of the United Kingdom of Great Britain and Ireland and the Government of Italy for the Mutual Relief of Distressed Seamen (London, 8 June 1880)
- 1888 – Agreement between the United Kingdom of Great Britain and Ireland and Brazil for the Surrender of Merchant Seamen Deserters (Rio de Janeiro, 30 July 1888)
- 1889 – Declaration between the United Kingdom of Great Britain and Ireland and France respecting the Disposal of the Proceeds of Wrecks on their respective Coasts (Paris, 23 October 1889)
- 1892 – Treaty between the Government of the United Kingdom of Great Britain and Ireland and the Government of the United States of America respecting Merchant Seamen Deserters (Washington, 3 June 1892)
- 1893 – Convention between the United Kingdom of Great Britain and Ireland and Roumania respecting False Indications of Origin on Goods (Bucharest, 1 April 1893)
- 1895 – Convention between the United Kingdom of Great Britain and Ireland and the Netherlands defining the Boundaries between the British and Netherland Possessions in the Island of New Guinea (The Hague, 16 May 1895)
- 1897 – Treaty of Friendship between the United Kingdom of Great Britain and Ireland and Ethiopia (Addis Ababa, 14 May 1897)

== 1901–1922 bilateral treaties ==
Federation to after World War I. Includes treaties signed by the British empire for and behalf of Australia and other dependencies, with one other nation.

- 1902 – Convention between the United Kingdom of Great Britain and Ireland and the United States of America relative to the Disposal of Real and Personal Property
- 1902 – Treaty between the United Kingdom of Great Britain and Ireland and the United States of America relative to the Establishment of a Communication by Ship Canal between the Atlantic and Pacific Oceans (Hay–Pauncefote Treaty)
- 1902 – Agreement [amending Article 4] between the United Kingdom of Great Britain and Ireland and France Additional to the Convention respecting Postal Communications of 30 August 1890
- 1903 – Convention between the United Kingdom of Great Britain and Ireland and Japan for the Protection of the Estates of Deceased Persons
- 1913 – Declaration between the Government of the United Kingdom of Great Britain and Ireland and the Government of Germany additional to the Agreement relative to Joint Stock Companies of 27 March 1874 (Berlin, 25 March 1913)
- 1914 – Treaty between the United Kingdom of Great Britain and Ireland and the United States of America with regard to the Establishment of a Peace Commission
- 1918 – Agreement between the United Kingdom of Great Britain and Ireland and France respecting British War Graves in France
- 1919 – Agreement between the Government of the United Kingdom of Great Britain and Ireland and the Government of Belgium respecting British War Graves in Belgian Territory
- 1919 – Treaty between the United Kingdom of Great Britain and Ireland and Chile for the Establishment of a Peace Commission
- 1920 – Exchange of Notes constituting an Agreement between the Government of the United Kingdom of Great Britain and Ireland and the Government of the Republic of France respecting the Restoration of Property and Payment of Debts due by Enemy Businesses in Liquidation
- 1921 – Treaty Between the United Kingdom of Great Britain and Ireland and Brazil Providing for the Establishment of a Peace Commission
- 1921 – Agreement between the Government of the United Kingdom of Great Britain and Ireland and the Government of Greece relative to the Graves of British Soldiers in Hellenic Territory
- 1922 – Agreement between the Government of the United Kingdom of Great Britain and Ireland and the Government of Italy respecting the Graves of British Soldiers in Italy
- 1922 – Agreement between the Government of the United Kingdom of Great Britain and Ireland and the Government of Japan respecting the Tonnage Measurement of Merchant Ships, and Exchange of Notes

== 1923–1939 bilateral treaties ==
Includes treaties signed by the British empire for and behalf of Australia and other dependencies, with one other nation.

- 1924 – Convention between the United Kingdom of Great Britain and Ireland and the United States of America respecting the Regulation of the Liquor Traffic
- 1925 – Agreement between the United Kingdom of Great Britain and Ireland, and Italy, to Regulate the Professional Practice of Medical Practitioners in their Respective Territories
- 1928 – Convention between the United Kingdom and Belgium respecting Legal Proceedings in Civil and Commercial Matters
- 1928 – Convention between the United Kingdom and France respecting Legal Proceedings in Civil and Commercial Matters
- 1929 – Exchanges of Notes constituting an Agreement between the Government of the United Kingdom of Great Britain and Northern Ireland [and on behalf of Australia, Canada, Eire, India, Newfoundland, New Zealand and South Africa] and the Government of the Union of the Soviet Socialist Republics [concerning propaganda] on the Resumption of Diplomatic Relations
- 1930 – Agreement between the Government of Australia and the Government of the German Reich regarding the Release of Property, Rights and Interests of German Nationals, and Exchange of Notes
- 1931 – Exchange of Notes constituting an Agreement between the Government of the United Kingdom of Great Britain and Northern Ireland [and on behalf of Australia, Canada, India, New Zealand and South Africa] and the Government of Italy respecting Documents of Identity for Aircraft Personnel
- 1933 – Agreement between Australia and the United Kingdom for the Establishment and Maintenance of a Telephone Service between Great Britain and Northern Ireland and the Commonwealth of Australia
- 1935 – Convention between the United Kingdom and Belgium supplementary to the Convention respecting Legal Proceedings in Civil and Commercial Matters of 21 June 1922
- 1935 – Convention between the United Kingdom and Denmark regarding Legal Proceedings in Civil and Commercial Matters
- 1935 – Convention between the United Kingdom and Finland regarding Legal Proceedings in Civil and Commercial Matters
- 1935 – Convention between the United Kingdom and the Netherlands regarding Legal Proceedings in Civil and Commercial Matters
- 1935 – Convention between the United Kingdom and the Republic of Turkey regarding Legal Proceedings in Civil and Commercial Matters, and Protocol of Signature
- 1935 – Exchange of Notes constituting an Agreement between the Government of the United Kingdom of Great Britain and Northern Ireland and the Government of the German Reich regarding the Limitation of Naval Armaments
- 1936 – Exchange of Notes constituting an Agreement between the Government of Australia and the Government of French Indo-China regarding the Exemption from Consular Visas on Bills of Health of Vessels Registered in their respective Countries (Sydney-Canberra, 8–20 May 1936)
- 1936 – Agreement between the Governments of Australia, Canada, India, New Zealand, South Africa and the United Kingdom, and the Government of Iraq, regarding British War Cemeteries in Iraq, and Exchange of Notes
- 1936 – Exchange of Notes constituting an Agreement between Governments of Australia, Canada, India, New Zealand and the United Kingdom, and the Government of Italy, concerning the Interpretation of Article 7 of the Agreement respecting Graves of British Soldiers in Italy of 11 May 1922 (Rome, 6 August 1936)
- 1936 – Exchange of Notes constituting an Agreement between the Government of Australia and the Government of the Netherlands regarding the Boundary between Netherlands New Guinea and the Mandated Territory of New Guinea
- 1937 – Exchange of Notes constituting an Agreement between the Governments of Australia, India, New Zealand and the United Kingdom, and the Government of Denmark, regarding Documents of Identity for Aircraft Personnel
- 1937 – Agreement between the Governments of Australia, Canada, India, New Zealand, South Africa and the United Kingdom, and the Government of Egypt, regarding British War Memorial Cemeteries and Graves in Egypt, and Exchange of Note
- 1937 – Exchange of Notes constituting an Agreement between the Governments of Australia, India, New Zealand and the United Kingdom of Great Britain and Northern Ireland, and the Norwegian Government, regarding Documents of Identity for Aircraft Personnel
- 1938 – Exchange of Notes constituting an Agreement between the Governments of Australia, India, New Zealand and the United Kingdom of Great Britain and Northern Ireland, and the Government of Belgium regarding Documents of Identity for Aircraft Personnel
- 1938 – Exchange of Notes [between United Kingdom and Bulgaria] terminating, in effect, Part IV of the Treaty of Peace of 27 November 1919 and the Convention respecting the Thracian Frontiers [under the Treaty of Peace with Turkey of 24 July 1923]
- 1938 – Convention between the United Kingdom and France for the Abolition of Capitulations in Morocco and Zanzibar, Protocol of Signature
- 1938 – Exchange of Notes constituting an Agreement between the Governments of Australia, New Zealand and the United Kingdom of the Great Britain and Northern Ireland, and the Government of the French Republic, regarding Aerial Navigation in the Antarctic (Paris, 25 October 1938)
- 1938 – Convention between the Governments of Australia, Canada, New Zealand and the United Kingdom of Great Britain and Northern Ireland, and the Government of the French Republic, concerning the Transfer to the French State of the Property in the Sites of British Monuments commemorative of the War 1914–1918
- 1938 – Exchange of Notes constituting an Agreement between the Governments of Australia, India, New Zealand and the United Kingdom of Great Britain and Northern Ireland, and the Government of Sweden, regarding Documents of Identity
- 1938 – Exchange of Notes constituting an Agreement between the Governments of Australia, India, New Zealand and the United Kingdom of Great Britain and Northern Ireland, and the Swiss Federal Council, regarding Documents of Identity
- 1939 – Exchange of Notes constituting an Agreement between the Governments of the United Kingdom of Great Britain and Northern Ireland, Australia, New Zealand and India, and the Netherlands Government regarding Documents of Identity for Aircraft Personnel
- 1939 – Exchange of Notes constituting an Agreement between the Governments of the United Kingdom of Great Britain and Northern Ireland, Canada, the Commonwealth of Australia and New Zealand, and the Government of Iraq regarding the Service of Documents

== 1940–1955 bilateral treaties ==
Includes treaties signed by the British empire for and behalf of Australia and other dependencies, with one other nation.

- 1940 – Convention between the United Kingdom of Great Britain and Northern Ireland and Switzerland concerning Legal Proceedings
- 1940 – Exchange of Notes constituting an Agreement between His Majesty's Governments in the United Kingdom, the Commonwealth of Australia and New Zealand, and the Government of India, and the Portuguese Government, respecting Documents of Identity for Aircraft Personnel
- 1941 – Supplementary Convention between Great Britain and Northern Ireland, Australia and New Zealand, and the United States of America, amending [Article IV and VI.2 of] the Convention relative to the Disposal of Real and Personal Property of 2 March 1899
- 1941 – Treaty between Australia and the United States of America amending in their Application to Australia certain Provisions of the Treaty respecting the Establishment of a Peace Commission of 15 September 1914
- 1942 – Exchange of Notes constituting an Agreement between the Government of Australia and the Government of the United States of America relating to the Services of Nationals of One Country in the Armed Forces of the Other Country
- 1942 – Exchange of Notes constituting an Agreement between the Government of Australia and the Government of the United States of America relating to the Principles applying to the Provision of Aid in the Prosecution of the War
- 1943 – Agreement between the Government of Australia and the Government of New Zealand in respect to Reciprocity in Payment of Pensions
- 1944 – Agreement between the Governments of the Commonwealth of Australia and Canada on the Principles applying to the Provision by Canada of Canadian War Supplies to the Commonwealth of Australia under the War Appropriation (United Nations Mutual Aid) Act of Canada 1943
- 1944 – Australian-New Zealand Agreement 1944
- 1944 – Exchange of Notes constituting an Agreement between the Government of Australia and the Government of the United States of America relating to Jurisdiction over Prizes taken by Naval Forces in Foreign Waters
- 1945 – Agreement between the Governments of the Commonwealth of Australia and the United States of America relating to the Waiver of Claims with respect to Certain Problems of Marine Transportation and Litigation
- 1945 – Agreement between the Government of the Commonwealth of Australia and the Government of Canada with respect to the Loan to the Government of the Commonwealth of Australia of Vessels owned by the Government of Canada
- 1946 – Air Transport Agreement between the Government of the Commonwealth of Australia and the Government of the United States of America
- 1946 – Final Peace Agreement between the Government of Australia and the Government of Siam
- 1946 – Exchange of Notes constituting an Agreement between the Government of Australia and Government of Siam for the Settlement of Obligations between Siam and British Commonwealth Mine-Owners, and the Supply of Tin
- 1946 – Agreement extending certain expiry dates in the Memorandum of Understanding regarding Tin concluded under the Agreement of 7 December 1946
- 1947 – Exchange of Notes constituting an Agreement between the Government of Australia and the Government of the Kingdom of the Netherlands terminating the Agreement concerning Financial Matters regarding the Operations of Australian and Netherlands Indies Forces of 1 May 1946
- 1947 – Agreement between the Government of Australia and the Government of the United States of America concerning Aerodrome Facilities (at Eagle Farm and RAAF Base Amberley)
- 1947 – Exchange of Notes constituting an Agreement between the Government of Australia and the Government of Norway concerning the Release of Property in the Commonwealth of Australia belonging to Persons Resident in Norway
- 1947 – Exchange of Notes constituting an Agreement between the Government of Australia and the Government of the Netherlands concerning Financial Arrangements
- 1947 – Exchange of Notes constituting an Agreement between the Government of Australia and the Government of the Republic of France relating to Money and Property situated in France and Australia which have been subjected to Special Measures in consequence of the Enemy Occupation of France
- 1947 – Agreement between the Government of Australia and the Government of the United Kingdom of Great Britain and Northern Ireland for the Avoidance of Double Taxation and the Prevention of Fiscal Evasion with respect to Taxes on Income
- 1947 – Agreement further extending certain expiry dates in the Memorandum of Understanding regarding Tin concluded under the Agreement of 7 December 1946
- 1947 – Agreement further extending certain expiry dates in the Memorandum of Understanding regarding Tin concluded under the Agreement of 7 December 1946
- 1947 – Memorandum of Agreement between the Government of the Commonwealth of Australia and the United Kingdom Government concerning a Government Free Passage Scheme for Ex-Service Men and Women
- 1947 – Exchange of Notes constituting an Agreement between the Government of Australia and the Government of Siam to Provide a Means for the Early Settlement of Certain Claims by British Subjects against the Government of Siam
- 1948 – Exchange of Notes constituting an Agreement between the Government of Australia and the Government of Greece concerning the Release of Greek Assets held under Australian Statutes
- 1948 – Exchange of Notes constituting an Agreement between the Government of Australia and the Government of Poland regarding a Gift of Wool to Poland
- 1948 – Exchange of Notes constituting an Agreement between the Government of Australia and the Government of Hungary regarding a Gift of Wool to Hungary
- 1948 – Exchange of Notes constituting an Agreement between the Government of Australia and the Government of Greece regarding a Gift of Relief Supplies to Greece
- 1948 – Exchange of Notes constituting an Agreement between the Government of Australia and the Government of Italy regarding a Gift of Wool to Italy
- 1948 – Exchange of Notes constituting an Agreement between the Government of Australia and the Government of Yugoslavia regarding a Gift of Wool to Yugoslavia
- 1948 – Exchange of Notes constituting an Agreement between the Government of Australia and the Government of Austria regarding a Gift of Wool to Austria
- 1948 – Exchange of Notes constituting an Agreement between the Government of Australia and the Government of Denmark regarding the Release of Danish Assets held under Australian Statutes
- 1948 – Exchange of Notes constituting an Agreement between the Government of Australia and the Government of Belgium regarding the Release of Belgian Assets held under Australian Statutes
- 1949 – Exchange of Notes between the Government of Australia and the Government of Finland reviving certain pre-War Agreements between Australia and Finland
- 1949 – Agreement on Social Security between the Government of Australia and the Government of New Zealand
- 1949 – Exchange of Notes constituting an Agreement between the Government of Australia and the Government of the Netherlands (on behalf of the Government of Indonesia) concerning the Final Settlement of all Claims arising out of World War II
- 1949 – Agreement [Fulbright Agreement] between the Government of Australia and the Government of the United States of America for the Use of Funds made available in accordance with the Agreement on Settlement of Lend-Lease, Reciprocal Aid, Surplus War Property and Claims of 7 June 1946
- 1949 – Agreement between the Government of Australia and the Government of New Zealand regarding Christmas Island
- 1949 – Agreement between the Government of Australia and the Government of Malta relating to Migration
- 1950 – Exchange of Notes constituting an Agreement between the Government of Australia and the Government of the United States of America concerning the Reciprocal Waiver of Visa Fees
- 1950 – Exchange of Notes constituting an Agreement between the Government of Australia and the Government of the Federal People's Republic of Yugoslavia for the Release of Property subject to Special Measures in Consequence of the Enemy Occupation of Yugoslavia
- 1950 – Exchange of Notes constituting an Agreement between the Government of Australia and the Government of the Kingdom of the Netherlands regarding the Release of Property subjected to Special Measures in consequence of the Enemy Occupation of the Netherlands
- 1951 – Exchange of Notes constituting an Agreement between the Government of Australia and the Government of Finland for the Release of Property and the Settlement of Claims arising out of the Second World War
- 1951 – Exchange of Notes constituting an Agreement between the Government of Australia and the Government of the United Kingdom of Great Britain and Northern Ireland regarding the transfer of Heard and MacDonald Islands from the United Kingdom to Australia
- 1951 – Exchange of Notes constituting an Agreement between the Government of Australia and the Government of the Netherlands concerning Visas and Visa Fees
- 1951 – Exchange of Notes constituting an Agreement between the Government of Australia and the Government of Italy on Visas and Visa Fees
- 1951 – Exchange of Notes constituting an Agreement between the Government of Australia and the Government of Belgium concerning Visas and Visa Fees
- 1951 – Exchange of Notes constituting an Agreement between the Government of Australia and the Government of the Grand Duchy of Luxembourg regarding Visas and Visa Fees
- 1951 – Exchange of Letters constituting an Arrangement between the Government of Australia and the Government of Ceylon regarding an Australian Contribution under the Colombo Plan
- 1951 – Exchange of Notes constituting an Agreement between the Government of Australia and the Government of Sweden on Visas and Visa Fees
- 1951 – Agreement between the Government of the Commonwealth of Australia and the Government of the Netherlands for Assisted Migration
- 1951 – Agreement between the Government of the Commonwealth of Australia and the Government of Italy for Assisted Migration
- 1951 – Exchange of Notes constituting an Agreement between the Government of Australia and the Government of France concerning War Damage Compensation
- 1951 – Exchange of Notes constituting an Agreement between the Government of Australia and the Government of Norway on Visas and Visa Fees
- 1951 – Exchange of Notes between the Government of Australia and the Government of Italy concerning the Force and Status of Certain Provisions of the Treaty of Peace with Italy of 10 February 1947
- 1951 – Exchange of Notes constituting an Agreement between the Government of Australia and the Government of the United States of America relating to Mutual Defense Assistance
- 1951 – Exchanges of Notes constituting an Agreement between the Government of Australia and the Government of Thailand regarding the Settlement of Outstanding Commonwealth War Claims against Thailand
- 1951 – Exchange of Notes constituting an Agreement between the Government of Australia and the Government of the United States of America relating to Technical Assistance in connection with Proposed Projects of the Snowy Mountains Hydroelectric Authority
- 1952 – Exchange of Notes constituting an Agreement between the Government of Australia and the Government of Denmark regarding Visas and Visa Fees
- 1952 – Exchange of Notes constituting an Agreement between the Government of Australia and the Government of Italy regarding the Release of Italian Property subject to Australian Statutes and the Settlement of Australian Claims
- 1952 – Agreement between the Government of the Commonwealth of Australia and the Government of the Federal Republic of Germany for Assisted Migration
- 1952 – Exchange of Notes constituting an Agreement between the Government of Australia and the Royal Hellenic Government on the Rights and Privileges of the Australian Migration Office in Athens
- 1952 – Exchange of Notes constituting an Agreement between the Government of the Commonwealth of Australia and the Government of the United States of America modifying Paragraph 3(b) of the Agreement of 7 June 1946 and Article 11 of the Agreement of 26 November 1949, relating to Lend-Lease Settlement Funds
- 1952 – Exchange of Notes constituting an Agreement between the Government of the United Kingdom of Great Britain and Northern Ireland and the Government of Egypt extending the Agreement establishing a Commercial Modus Vivendi of 5 June 1930
- 1953 – Exchange of Notes constituting an Agreement between the Government of Australia and the Government of the Federal Republic of Germany regarding Visas and Visa Fees
- 1953 – Convention between the Government of the Commonwealth of Australia and the Government of the United States of America for the Avoidance of Double Taxation and the Prevention of Fiscal Evasion with respect to Taxes on Income
- 1953 – Exchange of Notes between the Government of Australia and the Government of Japan regarding the Revival of Pre-War Treaties between Australia and Japan
- 1953 – Exchange of Notes constituting an Agreement between the Government of Australia and the Government of Ceylon concerning the Exchange of Official Publications
- 1953 – Exchange of Notes constituting an Agreement between the Government of the Commonwealth of Australia and the Government of the Federative People's Republic of Yugoslavia concerning the Exchange of Official Publications
- 1954 – Agreement on Social Security between the Government of the Commonwealth of Australia and the Government of the United Kingdom of Great Britain and Northern Ireland
- 1954 – Agreement between the Government of Australia and the Government of Japan on a Provisional Regime to Regulate Pearling by Japanese Nationals pending the Final Decision of the International Court of Justice in the Dispute concerning the Application to Japanese Nationals of the Australian Pearl Fisheries Act 1952–1953
- 1954 – Exchange of Notes constituting an Agreement between the Government of Australia and the Government of Greece regarding Visas and Visa Fees
- 1954 – Exchange of Notes constituting an Agreement between the Government of Australia and the Government of the United States of America amending the Agreement of 26 November 1949 for the Use of Funds Made Available under the Agreement of regarding Settlement for Lease-Lend, Reciprocal Aid, Surplus War Property, and Claims 7 June 1946
- 1954 – Exchange of Notes constituting an Agreement between the Government of Australia and the Government of Vietnam for the Exchange of Official Publications
- 1955 – Exchange of Notes constituting an Agreement between the Government of the Commonwealth of Australia and the Government of the French Republic regarding the Exchange of Official Publications
- 1955 – Exchange of Notes constituting an Agreement between the Government of Australia and the Government of the United States of America relating to Non-Immigrant Passport Visas

== 1956–1970 bilateral treaties ==
- 1956 – Exchange of Notes constituting an Agreement between the Government of Australia and the Royal Hellenic Government on the Rights and Privileges accorded to the Australian Consulate-General at Athens
- 1956 – Exchange of Notes constituting an Agreement between the Government of Australia and the Government of the Federal Republic of Austria on Visas and Visa Fees
- 1956 – Exchange of Notes constituting an Agreement between the Government of Australia and the Government of Turkey on Visas and Visa Fees
- 1956 – Exchange of Notes constituting an Agreement between the Government of Australia and the Government of Thailand regarding the Exchange of Official Publications
- 1957 – Exchange of Notes constituting an Agreement between the Government of the Commonwealth of Australia and the Government of the United States of America regarding the Furnishing of Supplies and Services to Naval Vessels
- 1957 – Assisted Migration Agreement between the Government of the Commonwealth of Australia and the Government of the Kingdom of the Netherlands
- 1957 – Assisted Passage Migration Agreement between the Government of Australia and the Government of the United Kingdom of Great Britain and Northern Ireland
- 1957 – Agreement for Cooperation between the Government of the Commonwealth of Australia and the Government of the United States of America concerning the Civil Uses of Atomic Energy
- 1957 – Agreement between the Government of the Commonwealth of Australia and the Maltese Government relating to an Assisted Passage Migration Scheme
- 1958 – Agreement on Social Security between the Government of the Commonwealth of Australia and the Government of the United Kingdom of Great Britain and Northern Ireland
- 1958 – Exchange of Notes constituting an Agreement between the Government of Australia and the Government of the Netherlands concerning Reciprocal Exemptions from Duties and Charges in respect of Non-Scheduled Flights
- 1958 – Exchange of Notes constituting an Agreement between the Government of Australia and the Government of Denmark to amend the Agreement on Visas and Visa Fees of 1 May 1952
- 1958 – Exchange of Notes constituting an Agreement between the Government of Australia and the Government of Norway to amend the Agreement on Visas and Visa Fees of 19 October 1951
- 1958 – Exchange of Notes constituting an Agreement between the Government of Australia and the Government of Sweden to amend the Agreement on Visas and Visa Fees of 26 September 1951
- 1958 – Agreement between the Government of the Commonwealth of Australia and the Government of Canada for the Avoidance of Double Taxation and the Prevention of Fiscal Evasion with respect to Taxes on Income
- 1958 – Exchanges of Notes constituting an Agreement between the Government of Australia and the Government of the Netherlands concerning the Settlement of Intercustodial Conflicts relating to German Enemy Assets
- 1958 – Exchange of Notes constituting an Agreement between the Government of Australia and the Government of the United States of America relating to the Establishment of a Weather Station on Nauru
- 1958 – Exchange of Notes constituting an Agreement between the Government of Australia and the Government of New Zealand concerning Article 6 of the Agreement relating to Christmas Island of 30 September 1958
- 1959 – Agreement between the Government of the Commonwealth of Australia and the Government of the Federal Republic of Germany for Assisted Migration
- 1959 – Exchange of Notes constituting an Agreement between the Government of Australia and the Government of Italy relating to the Importation of Bovine Meat into Italy
- 1959 – Exchange of Notes constituting an Agreement between the Government of Australia and the Royal Thai Government relating to Duty Free Entry of Colombo Plan Equipment
- 1959 – Exchange of Notes constituting an Agreement between the Government of Australia and the Federal Council of the Swiss Confederation, acting for the Canton of Vaud, terminating the Declaration relative to Succession or Legacy Duties of 27 August 1872
- 1959 – Agreement between the Government of the Commonwealth of Australia and the Government of Canada for Cooperation in the Peaceful Uses of Atomic Energy
- 1959 – Convention between United Kingdom and France supplementary to the Convention respecting Legal Proceedings in Civil and Commercial Matters of 2 February 1922, and Procedures-Verbal
- 1959 – Exchange of Notes constituting an Agreement between the Government of Australia and the Government of Austria on the Release of Austrian Property held under Australian Statutes and Australian Property subject to Austrian Measures
- 1959 – Exchange of Notes constituting an Agreement between the Government of Australia and the Government of the United Kingdom of Great Britain and Northern Ireland to amend Clause 3 of the Assisted Passage Migration Agreement of 1 April 1957
- 1959 – Exchange of Notes constituting an Agreement between the Government of Australia and the Government of the Principality of Monaco relating to Visas and Visa Fees
- 1959 – Exchange of Notes constituting an Agreement between the Government of Australia and the Government of the United States of America relating to Non-Immigrant Visa Procedures
- 1960 – Exchange of Notes constituting an Agreement between the Government of Australia and the Government of the United States of America relating to Space Vehicle Tracking and Communications
- 1960 – Exchange of Notes constituting an Agreement between the Government of Australia and the Government of the Republic of the Philippines relating to Visa Fees
- 1960 – Agreement between the Government of the Commonwealth of Australia and the Government of New Zealand for the Avoidance of Double Taxation and the Prevention of Fiscal Evasion with respect to Taxes on Income
- 1960 – Mutual Weapons Development Program Agreement between the Government of the Commonwealth of Australia and the Government of the United States of America
- 1960 – Exchange of Notes constituting an Agreement between the Government of Australia and the Government of the United Kingdom of Great Britain and Northern Ireland to further amend Clause 5 of the Assisted Passage Migration Agreement of 1 April 1957
- 1961 – Exchange of Notes constituting an Agreement between the Government of Australia and the Government of Finland concerning Visas and Visa Fees
- 1961 – Exchange of Notes constituting an Agreement between the Government of Australia and the Government of the United States of America relating to Upper Atmosphere Sampling [HIBAL]
- 1961 – Agreement between the Government of the Commonwealth of Australia and the Government of the United States of America to amend the Agreement for Cooperation concerning the Civil Uses of Atomic Energy of 22 June 1956
- 1961 – Exchange of Notes constituting an Agreement between the Government of Australia and the Government of the United States of America for an Ultraviolet Survey of Southern Skies
- 1961 – Exchange of Notes constituting an Agreement between the Government of Australia and the Government of the United States of America for Cooperation in a Transit Navigational Satellite Program
- 1961 – Exchange of Notes constituting an Agreement between the Government of Australia and the Government of the Kingdom of the Netherlands extending the Validity of the Assisted Migration Agreement of 1 August 1956
- 1961 – Exchange of Notes constituting an Agreement between the Government of Australia and the Government of Spain concerning Visas and Visa Fees
- 1961 – Exchange of Notes constituting an Agreement between the Government of Australia and the Government of the United Kingdom of Great Britain and Northern Ireland concerning Customs Arrangements for Non-Scheduled Flights
- 1962 – Exchange of Notes constituting an Agreement between the Government of Australia and the Government of the Kingdom of the Netherlands further extending the Validity of the Assisted Passage Migration Agreement of 1 August 1956
- 1962 – Australia/United Kingdom Assisted Passage [migration] Agreement
- 1962 – Exchange of Notes constituting an Agreement between the Government of Australia and the Government of Japan relating to Cooperation in the Civil Uses of Atomic Energy
- 1962 – Agreement between the Government of Australia and the Government of the United Kingdom of Great Britain and Northern Ireland to amend the Agreement on Social Security of 29 January 1958
- 1962 – Exchange of Notes constituting an Agreement between the Government of Australia and the Government of the Kingdom of the Netherlands further extending the Validity of the Assisted Migration Agreement of 1 August 1956
- 1962 – Exchange of Notes constituting an Agreement between the Government of Australia and the Government of the United States of America to extend the Agreement relating to Upper Atmosphere Sampling of 9 May 1961
- 1962 – Exchange of Notes constituting an Agreement between the Government of Australia and the Government of the Federation of Malaya on the Exchange of Planting Material between Malaya and Papua and New Guinea
- 1963 – Agreement between Government of the Commonwealth of Australia and the Government of the Federation of Rhodesia and Nyasaland for an Exchange of Money Orders
- 1963 – Exchange of Notes constituting an Agreement between the Government of Australia and the Government of the United States of America amending the Agreement relating to Space Vehicle Tracking and Communications of 26 February 1960
- 1963 – Exchange of Notes constituting an Agreement between the Government of Australia and the Government of the Kingdom of the Netherlands to further extend the Validity the Assisted Migration Agreement of 1 August 1956
- 1963 – Exchange of Notes constituting an Agreement between the Government of Australia and the Government of the United States of America to amend the Agreement regarding the Furnishing of Supplies and Services to Naval Vessels of 19 December 1956
- 1963 – Exchange of Notes constituting an Agreement between the Government of Australia and the Government of Portugal relating to Visas and Visa Fees
- 1963 – Agreement between the Government of the Commonwealth of Australia and the Government of the United States of America concerning the Status of United States Forces in Australia, and Protocol
- 1963 – Agreement between the Government of the Commonwealth of Australia and the Government of the State of Singapore concerning the Provision of Treatment in Singapore Hospitals for Asian Residents of Christmas Island
- 1963 – Agreement between the Government of the Commonwealth of Australia and the Government of the United States of America relating to the Establishment of a United States Naval Communication Station in Australia [North West Cape – Exmouth WA]
- 1963 – Exchange of Notes constituting an Agreement between the Government of Australia and the Government of Finland for the Mutual Recognition of Tonnage Measurement Certificates of Australian and Finnish Ships
- 1963 – Exchange of Notes constituting an Agreement between the Government of Australia and the Government of the United States of America to further amend the Agreement relating to Space Vehicle Tracking and Communications of 26 February 1960
- 1963 – Exchange of Notes constituting an Agreement between the Government of Australia and the Government of India on Defence Aid to India
- 1963 – Exchange of Notes constituting an Agreement between the Government of Australia and the Royal Lao Government concerning the Foreign Exchange Operations Fund for Laos
- 1964 – Exchange of Notes constituting an Agreement between the Government of the Commonwealth of Australia and the Government of the United States of America regarding a Joint Research Program for Studying Aero-Space Disturbances and their Effect on Radio Communications
- 1964 – Exchange of Notes constituting an Agreement between the Government of the Commonwealth of Australia and the Government of the Republic of Italy relating to Assisted Migration
- 1964 – Exchange of Notes constituting an Agreement between the Government of Australia and the Government of Israel on Visas and Visa Fees
- 1964 – Exchange of Notes constituting an Agreement between the Government of Australia and the Government of the United States of America relating to Meat Exports from Australia to the United States of America
- 1964 – Exchange of Letters constituting an Agreement between the Government of Australia and the Government of the United Kingdom of Great Britain and Northern Ireland on Cereals Marketing
- 1964 – Agreement between the Government of the Commonwealth of Australia and the Government of the United States of America for the Financing of Certain Educational and Cultural Exchange Programmes
- 1965 – Exchange of Notes constituting an Agreement between the Government of the Commonwealth of Australia and the Government of the United States of America to further amend the Agreement relating to Space Vehicle Tracking and Communications of 26 February 1960
- 1965 – Exchange of Notes constituting an Agreement between the Government of Australia and the Government of the United States of America regarding a Joint Research Program for Measuring the Physical Effects of Disturbances in the Atmosphere or in Space with particular emphasis on their effect on Radio Communications
- 1965 – Exchange of Notes constituting an Amendment to the Agreement between the Government of Australia and the Royal Government of Laos concerning the Foreign Exchange Operations Fund for Laos of 24 December 1962
- 1965 – Agreement between the Government of the Commonwealth of Australia and the Government of Malta for Assisted Migration
- 1965 – Exchange of Notes constituting an Agreement between the Government of the Commonwealth of Australia and the Government of the United States of America regarding the Reciprocal Granting of Authorizations to Permit Licensed Amateur Radio Operators of either Country to Operate their Stations in the Other Country
- 1965 – Agreement between the Government of the Commonwealth of Australia and the Government of the Federal Republic of Germany on Assisted Migration
- 1965 – Exchange of Notes constituting an Agreement between Australia and Malaysia relating to the Assumption by Malaysia of the Responsibilities of Singapore under the Agreement between Australia and Singapore concerning the Provision of Treatment in Singapore Hospitals for Asian Residents of Christmas Island of 6 June 1963, and for the Extension of the Operation of the Agreement
- 1965 – Exchange of Notes constituting an Agreement between the Government of the Commonwealth of Australia and the Government of the United States of America to further amend the Agreement relating to Space Vehicle Tracking and Communications of 26 February 1960
- 1965 – Migration and Settlement Agreement between the Commonwealth of Australia and the Kingdom of the Netherlands
- 1966 – Treaty between the Commonwealth of Australia and the Federal Republic of Germany regarding the Division between Australia and Germany of Compensation Paid by the Government of the State of Israel for German Secular Property in Israel [Templar Agreement], and Three Exchanges of Notes
- 1966 – Exchange of Notes constituting an amendment to the Agreement between the Government of Australia and the Royal Government of Laos concerning the Foreign Exchange Operations Fund for Laos of 24 December 1963
- 1966 – Exchange of Notes constituting an Agreement between the Government of the Commonwealth of Australia and the Government of the United States of America to amend and extend the Agreement relating to Upper Atmosphere Sampling of 9 May 1961
- 1966 – Agreement between the Government of the Commonwealth of Australia and the Government of the United States of America relating to the Establishment of a Joint Defence Space Research Facility [Pine Gap, NT]
- 1966 – Agreement between the Government of Australia and the Government of Canada concerning Application of the Canada Pension Plan to Locally Engaged Employees of the Government of Australia in Canada
- 1967 – Exchange of Notes constituting an amendment to the Agreement between the Government of Australia and the Royal Government of Laos concerning the Foreign Exchange Operations Fund for Laos of 24 December 1963
- 1967 – Exchange of Notes constituting an Agreement between the Government of Australia and the Government of the United Mexican States on Visa Fees
- 1967 – Amendment to Agreement for Cooperation between the Government of the Commonwealth of Australia and the Government of the United States of America concerning Civil Uses of Atomic Energy of 22 June 1956
- 1967 – Exchange of Notes constituting an Agreement between the Government of the Commonwealth of Australia and the Government of the United States of America to amend the Agreement for the Financing of Certain Educational and Cultural Exchange Programmes of 28 August 1964
- 1967 – Australia/United Kingdom Assisted Passage [Migration] Agreement
- 1967 – Exchange of Notes constituting an Agreement between the Government of the Commonwealth of Australia and the Austrian Federal Government on the Status of the Commonwealth War Cemetery at Klagenfurt, Carinthia
- 1967 – Agreement between the Government of the Commonwealth of Australia and the Government of the Republic of Turkey concerning the Residence and Employment of Turkish Citizens in Australia
- 1967 – Exchange of Notes constituting an Agreement between the Government of the Commonwealth of Australia and the Government of the French Republic concerning the Conduct of Balloon Launchings in Australia for Scientific and Meteorological Studies
- 1968 – Exchange of Notes between the Government of Australia and the Royal Lao Government constituting a further amendment to the Agreement concerning the Foreign Exchange Operations Fund for Laos of 24 December 1963
- 1968 – Agreement between the Government of the Commonwealth of Australia and the Government of the United Kingdom of Great Britain and Northern Ireland for the Avoidance of Double Taxation and the Prevention of Fiscal Evasion with respect to Taxes on Income and Capital Gains
- 1968 – Cultural Agreement between the Government of the Commonwealth of Australia and the Government of the Republic of Indonesia
- 1968 – Agreement between the Government of the Commonwealth of Australia and the Government of the Republic of Singapore concerning the Provision of Treatment in Singapore Hospitals for Asian Residents of Christmas Island
- 1968 – Agreement relating to Scientific and Technical Co-operation between the Government of the Commonwealth of Australia and the Government of the United States of America
- 1969 – Exchange of Notes constituting an Agreement between the Government of Australia and the Government of the United States of America relating to the Establishment by the United States of America of Facilities on Norfolk Island for Studying Ionospheric Propagation in relation to Long Range Radio Paths
- 1969 – Exchange of Notes constituting an Agreement between the Government of Australia and the Government of Iceland on Visas and Visa Fees
- 1969 – Exchange of Notes constituting an Agreement between the Government of Australia and the Government of the United States of America to amend and extend the Agreement relating to Upper Atmosphere Sampling of 9 May 1961, as amended
- 1969 – Agreement between the Government of the Commonwealth of Australia and the Government of the Republic of Singapore for the Avoidance of Double Taxation and the Prevention of Fiscal Evasion with respect to Taxes on Income
- 1969 – Exchange of Notes constituting an Agreement between the Government of Australia and the Government of the Socialist Federal Republic of Yugoslavia on the Abolition of Visa Fees
- 1969 – Exchange of Notes constituting an Agreement between the Government of Australia and the Government of the United States of America amending and extending the Agreement relating to the Establishment by the United States of America of Facilities on Norfolk Island for Studying Ionospheric Propagation in Relation to Long-Range Radio Paths of 13 January 1969
- 1969 – Exchange of Notes between the Government of Australia and the Royal Lao Government constituting a further amendment to the Agreement concerning the Foreign Exchange Operations Fund for Laos of 24 December 1963
- 1969 – Exchange of Notes between the Government of Australia and the Government of the Federative Republic of Brazil for the Issue of Gratis Visas to Visitors
- 1970 – Exchange of Notes constituting an Agreement between the Government of Australia and the Government of the United States of America regarding the Importation of Meat into the United States of America during 1970
- 1970 – Agreement between the Government of the Commonwealth of Australia and Government of the Socialist Federal Republic of Yugoslavia on the Residence and Employment of Yugoslav Citizens in Australia
- 1970 – Exchange of Notes constituting an Agreement between the Government of Australia and the Government of the United States of America regarding the Launching of Three Aerobee Rockets
- 1970 – Agreement between the Commonwealth of Australia and Japan for the Avoidance of Double Taxation and the Prevention of Fiscal Evasion with respect to Taxes on Income, and Protocol
- 1970 – Exchange of Notes between the Government of Australia and the Royal Lao Government constituting a further amendment to the Agreement concerning the Foreign Exchange Operations Fund for Laos of 24 December 1963
- 1970 – Agreement between the Government of the Commonwealth of Australia and the Government of the French Republic for the Avoidance of Double Taxation of Income derived from International Air Transport
- 1970 – Migration and Settlement Agreement between the Government of the Commonwealth of Australia and the Government of Malta

== 1971–1985 bilateral treaties ==
- 1971 – Exchange of Notes constituting an Agreement between the Government of Australia and the Royal Lao Government further amending the Agreement concerning the Foreign Exchange Operations Fund for Laos of 24 December 1963
- 1971 – Exchange of Notes constituting an Agreement between the Government of Australia and the Government of the United States of America regarding the Importation of Meat into the United States of America during 1971
- 1971 – Migration and Settlement Agreement between the Government of the Commonwealth of Australia and the Government of the Republic of Italy
- 1971 – Exchange of Letters constituting an Agreement between the Government of Australia and the Government of the United Kingdom of Great Britain and Northern Ireland amending and extending the Sterling Area Agreement of 25 September 1968
- 1972 – Exchange of Notes constituting an Agreement between the Government of Australia and the Government of the United States of America regarding the Importation of Meat into the United States of America during 1972
- 1972 – Exchange of Notes constituting an Agreement between the Government of Australia and the Royal Lao Government further amending the Agreement concerning the Foreign Exchange Operations Fund for Laos of 24 December 1963
- 1972 – Agreement between the Government of the Commonwealth of Australia and the Government of Japan for Co-operation in the Peaceful Uses of Atomic Energy
- 1972 – Agreement between the International Atomic Energy Agency, the Government of the Commonwealth of Australia and the Government of Japan for the Application of Agency Safeguards in respect of the Agreement between those Governments for Co-operation in the Peaceful Uses of Atomic Energy of 21 February 1972
- 1972 – Cultural Agreement between the Government of the Commonwealth of Australia and the Government of the Republic of Korea
- 1972 – Agreement between Australia and the Netherlands concerning Old Dutch Shipwrecks, and Arrangement
- 1972 – Exchange of Letters constituting an Agreement between the Government of Australia and the Government of Italy relating to Portability of Pensions
- 1972 – Exchange of Letters constituting an Agreement between the Government of Australia and the Government of Greece relating to Portability of Pensions
- 1972 – Exchange of Letters constituting an Agreement between the Government of Australia and the Government of Malta relating to Portability of Pensions
- 1972 – Exchange of Letters constituting an Agreement between the Government of Australia and the Government of Turkey relating to Portability of Pensions
- 1973 – Agreement between the Government of the Commonwealth of Australia and the Government of New Zealand for the Avoidance of Double Taxation and the Prevention of Fiscal Evasion with respect to Taxes on Income
- 1973 – Exchange of Letters constituting an Agreement between the Government of Australia and the Government of New Zealand on Rates and Margins of Preference
- 1973 – Exchange of Notes constituting an Agreement between the Government of Australia and the Royal Lao Government further amending the Agreement concerning the Foreign Exchange Operations Fund for Laos of 24 December 1963
- 1973 – Exchange of Notes constituting an Agreement between the Government of Australia and the Government of the United States of America extending the Agreement relating to Scientific and Technical Co-operation of 16 October 1968
- 1973 – Exchange of Notes constituting an Agreement between the Government of Australia and the Government of the United States of America concerning the Launching of Seven Aerobee Rockets
- 1973 – Exchange of Notes constituting an Agreement between the Government of Australia and the Government of the United States of America concerning the Disposal of United States Government Excess Property in Australia
- 1973 – Agreement between the Government of Australia and the Government of Sweden on the Exchange of Senior Labour Market Officers
- 1974 – Exchange of Notes constituting an Agreement between the Government of Australia and the Provisional Government of National Union of Laos further amending the Agreement concerning the Foreign Exchange Operations Fund for Laos of 24 December 1963
- 1974 – Exchange of Notes constituting an Agreement between the Government of Australia and the Government of the United States of America concerning a Cooperative Scientific Program designated Hi Star South
- 1974 – Exchange of Letters constituting an Agreement between the Government of Australia and the Government of New Zealand extending the Agreement concerning Rates and Margins of Preference of 7 May 1973
- 1974 – Agreement between Australia and Indonesia concerning Certain Boundaries between Papua New Guinea and Indonesia
- 1974 – Agreement between the Government of Australia (acting on its own behalf and on behalf of the Government of Papua New Guinea) and the Government of Indonesia concerning Administrative Border Arrangements as to the Bord
- 1975 – Agreement between the Government of Australia and the Government of the Union of Soviet Socialist Republics on Scientific-Technical Co-operation
- 1975 – Agreement between the Government of Australia and the Government of the Union of Soviet Socialist Republics on Cultural Co-operation
- 1974 – Cultural Agreement between the Government of Australia and the Government of Thailand
- 1975 – Exchange of Notes constituting an Agreement between the Government of Australia and the Government of the Federal Republic of Germany concerning the Launching of a Skylark Vehicle and Payload at Woomera for Scientific Purposes
- 1975 – Agreement between the Commonwealth of Australia and the Federal Republic of Germany for the Avoidance of Double Taxation and the Prevention of Fiscal Evasion with Respect to Taxes on Income and Capital and to certain other Taxes, and Protocol
- 1975 – Agreement between the Government of Australia and the Government of the Republic of India on Cooperation in the Fields of Science and Technology
- 1975 – Exchange of Notes constituting an Agreement between the Government of Australia and the Government of the United States of America concerning the Discontinuance of the Facility Used in Measuring the Physical Effects of Disturbances in the Atmosphere or in Space and the Transfer of this Facility to the Australian National University
- 1975 – Exchange of Notes constituting an Agreement between the Government of Australia and the Government of the United Kingdom of Great Britain and Northern Ireland to amend the Agreement on Social Security of 29 January 1958
- 1975 – Exchange of Notes constituting an Agreement between the Government of Australia and the Government of the Republic of Singapore extending the operation of Article 18(3) of the Agreement for the Avoidance of Double Taxation and the Prevention of Fiscal Evasion with respect to Taxes on Income of 11 February 1969
- 1975 – Agreement of Cultural Co-operation between Australia and Italy
- 1975 – Exchange of Notes constituting an Agreement between the Government of Australia and the Government of the United States of America regarding the Importation of Meat into the United States of America during 1975
- 1975 – Cultural Agreement between Australia and Iran
- 1975 – Exchange of Notes constituting an Agreement between the Government of Australia and the Government of the National Union of Laos further amending the Agreement concerning the Foreign Exchange Operations Fund for Laos of 24 December 1963
- 1975 – Cultural Agreement between the Government of Australia and the Government of the Republic of Singapore
- 1975 – Cultural Agreement between the Government of Australia and the Government of Malaysia
- 1976 – Cultural Agreement between the Government of Australia and the Government of Japan
- 1976 – Agreement between the Government of the Commonwealth of Australia and the Government of Italy for the Avoidance of Double Taxation of Income derived from International Air Transport
- 1976 – Exchange of Letters constituting an Agreement between the Government of Australia and the Government of New Zealand further extending the Agreement concerning Rates and Margins of Preference of 7 May 1973
- 1976 – Agreement between the Government of Australia and the Government of the People's Republic of China concerning "The Exhibition of Archaeological Finds of the People's Republic of China"
- 1976 – Exchange of Notes constituting an Agreement between the Government of Australia and the Government of the United States of America regarding the Importation of Meat into the United States of America during 1976
- 1976 – Agreement between the Government of Australia and the Government of New Zealand to amend the Christmas Island Agreement of 30 September 1958
- 1976 – Exchange of Notes constituting an Agreement between the Government of Australia and the Government of Canada relating to the Launching of a Canadian Scientific Rocket from Woomera
- 1976 – Agreement between Australia and the Kingdom of the Netherlands for the Avoidance of Double Taxation and the Prevention of Fiscal Evasion with respect to Taxes on Income, and Protocol
- 1976 – Agreement between the Government of Australia and the Government of the Federal Republic of Germany on Scientific and Technological Cooperation
- 1977 – Exchange of Notes constituting an Agreement between the Government of Australia and the Government of the United States of America concerning the Launching of Six Aerobee Sounding Rockets
- 1977 – Exchange of Notes constituting an Agreement between the Government of Australia and the Government of the United States of America regarding the Importation of Meat into the United States of America during 1977
- 1977 – Agreement between Australia and Papua New Guinea regarding the Status of Forces of each State in the Territory of the other State, and Agreed Minute
- 1977 – Agreement between the Government of Australia and the Government of the Republic of Nauru relating to Appeals to the High Court of Australia from the Supreme Court of Nauru
- 1977 – Agreement on Cultural Cooperation between the Government of Australia and the Government of the Socialist Federal Republic of Yugoslavia
- 1977 – Exchange of Letters constituting an Agreement between the Government of Australia and the Government of New Zealand further extending the Agreement on Rates and Margins of Preference of 7 May 1973
- 1977 – Exchange of Notes constituting an Agreement between the Government of Australia and the Government of Japan concerning Co-operation on the Project for the Geostationary Meteorological Satellite System
- 1977 – Basic Treaty of Friendship and Co-operation between Australia and Japan, and Protocol
- 1977 – Exchange of Notes constituting an Agreement between the Government of Australia and the Government of the United States of America for the Establishment in South-Eastern Australia of an OMEGA Navigation Facility
- 1977 – Agreement between the Government of Australia and the Government of the French Republic for the Avoidance of Double Taxation and the Prevention of Fiscal Evasion with respect to Taxes on Income
- 1977 – Exchange of Letters between the Government of Australia and the Government of New Zealand constituting an Agreement further extending the Agreement on Rates and Margins of Preference of 7 May 1973
- 1977 – Exchange of Notes constituting an Agreement between the Government of Australia and the Government of the United States of America amending the Agreement relating to the Establishment of a Joint Defence Space Research Facility of 9 December 1966 [Pine Gap] (Canberra, 19 October 1977). ATS 24 of 1977
- 1977 – Exchange of Notes constituting an Agreement between the Government of Australia and the Government of the United States of America concerning the Establishment, Maintenance and Operation of a Solar Observatory
- 1977 – Exchange of Letters constituting an Agreement between the Government of Australia and the Government of New Zealand on Tariffs and Tariff Preferences
- 1977 – Agreement between the Government of Australia and the United Nations concerning Provision of RAAF Caribon Aircraft for use by the United Nations Military Group in India and Pakistan (UNMOGIP)
- 1977 – Exchange of Notes constituting an Agreement between the Government of Australia and the Government of the People's Republic of China amending the Agreement concerning the Exhibition of Archaeological Finds of the People's Republic of China of 23 June 1976
- 1978 – Exchange of Notes constituting an Agreement between the Government of Australia and the Government of the United States of America regarding the Management and Operation of the Joint Geological and Geophysical Research Station at Alice Springs
- 1978 – Exchange of Notes constituting an Agreement between the Government of Australia and the Government of the United States of America regarding the Importation of Meat into the United States of America during 1978
- 1978 – Exchange of Notes constituting an Agreement between the Governments of Australia, Canada, India, New Zealand, the Republic of South Africa and the United Kingdom of Great Britain and Northern Ireland, and the Government of Japan, concerning the British Commonwealth War Cemetery in Japan
- 1978 – Cultural Agreement between the Government of Australia and the Government of the French Republic
- 1978 – Exchange of Notes constituting an Agreement amending the Agreement between the Government of Australia and the Government of the United States of America concerning Space Vehicle Tracking and Communication Facilities of 25 March 1970
- 1978 – Exchange of Notes constituting an Interim Agreement between the Government of Australia and the Government of the United States of America on Peaceful Nuclear Cooperation
- 1978 – Agreement between the Government of Australia and the Government of the Hashemite Kingdom of Jordan regarding Co-operation
- 1978 – Cultural Agreement between the Government of Australia and the Government of the Socialist Republic of Romania
- 1979 – Exchange of Notes constituting an Agreement between the Government of Australia and the Government of the Federal Republic of Germany concerning the Launching of Two Scientific Payloads from Woomera for Scientific Purposes
- 1979 – Exchange of Notes constituting an Agreement between the Government of Australia and the Government of the United States of America regarding the Importation of Meat into the United States of America during 1979
- 1979 – Agreement between the Government of Australia and the European Space Agency for a Co-operative Space Vehicle Tracking Program
- 1979 – Exchange of Notes constituting an Agreement between the Government of Australia and the Government of the Federal Republic of Germany for the Reciprocal Safeguarding of Classified Material
- 1979 – Agreement between Australia and the Kingdom of Belgium for the Avoidance of Double Taxation and the Prevention of Fiscal Evasion with respect to Taxes on Income
- 1980 – Agreement between the Government of Australia and the Government of the People's Republic of China on Cooperation in Science and Technology
- 1980 – Exchange of Notes constituting an Agreement between the Government of Australia and the Government of the United States of America concerning Space Vehicle Tracking and Communication Facilities
- 1980 – Agreement between the Government of Australia and the Government of the Republic of the Philippines for the Avoidance of Double Taxation and the Prevention of Fiscal Evasion with respect to Taxes on Income
- 1980 – Agreement between the Government of Australia and the Government of Denmark concerning Mutual Recognition of Tonnage Certificates
- 1980 – Exchange of Letters constituting an Agreement extending the Agreement between the Government of Australia and the Government of New Zealand on Tariffs and Tariff Preferences of 25 November 1977
- 1980 – Subsidiary Agreement between the Government of Australia and the Government of Japan concerning Japanese Tuna Long-Line Fishing
- 1980 – Protocol between the Government of Australia and the Government of the United Kingdom of Great Britain and Northern Ireland amending the Agreement for the Avoidance of Double Taxation and the Prevention of Fiscal Evasion with respect to Taxes on Income and Capital Gains of 7 December 1967
- 1980 – Exchange of Letters between the Government of Australia and the Government of the French Republic constituting a Transitional Agreement to enable Conversion and/or Enrichment in France of Australian Origin Nuclear Material supplied to Japan
- 1980 – Agreement between the Government of Australia and the Government of Japan on Co-operation in Research and Development in Science and Technology
- 1981 – Agreement between Australia and the United States of America concerning Peaceful Uses of Nuclear Energy, and Agreed Minute
- 1981 – Agreement between Australia and Switzerland for the Avoidance of Double Taxation with respect to Taxes on Income, and Protocol
- 1981 – Agreement between the Government of Australia and the Government of Japan for the Protection of Migratory Birds in Danger of Extinction and their Environment
- 1981 – Agreement between the Government of Australia and the Government of Canada concerning the Peaceful Uses of Nuclear Energy
- 1981 – Exchange of Notes constituting an Agreement between the Government of Australia and the Government of the United States of America for the Staging of United States Air Force B-52 Aircraft and Associated KC-135 Tanker Aircraft through Royal Australian Air Force Base Darwin
- 1981 – Agreement between the Government of Australia and the Government of the Hellenic Republic for the Avoidance of Double Taxation of Income derived from International Air Transport
- 1981 – Agreement on Cultural Co-operation between the Government of Australia and the Government of the People's Republic of China
- 1981 – Agreement on Economic and Technical Co-operation between the Government of Australia and the Government of the Kingdom of Saudi Arabia
- 1981 – Agreement between the Government of Australia and the Government of Sweden on Conditions and Controls for Nuclear Transfers for Peaceful Purposes between Australia and Sweden
- 1981 – Convention between Australia and Canada for the Avoidance of Double Taxation and the Prevention of Fiscal Evasion with respect to Taxes on Income
- 1981 – Agreement between the Government of Australia and the Government of Malaysia for the Avoidance of Double Taxation and the Prevention of Fiscal Evasion with respect to Taxes on Income (Canberra, 20 August 1980)
- 1981 – Agreement between the Government of Australia and the Government of the Hellenic Republic on Cultural Cooperation
- 1981 – Exchange of Notes between the Government of Australia and the Government of the United States of America constituting an Agreement to amend the Agreement concerning Space Vehicle Tracking and Communication Facilities of 29 May 1980
- 1981 – Agreement between the Government of Australia and the Government of Sweden for the Avoidance of Double Taxation and the Prevention of Fiscal Evasion with respect to Taxes on Income
- 1981 – Exchange of Notes constituting an Agreement between the Government of Australia and the Government of Japan concerning Co-operation on the Project for the Geostationary Meteorological Satellite-2 System
- 1981 – Protocol on Economic Co-operation between the Government of Australia and the Government of the People's Republic of China
- 1981 – Agreement between the Government of Australia and the Government of the People's Republic of China on a Program of Technical Co-operation for Development
- 1981 – Subsidiary Agreement between the Government of Australia and the Government of Japan concerning Japanese Tuna Long-Line Fishing
- 1981 – Agreement between the Government of Australia and the Government of the French Republic concerning Nuclear Transfers between Australia and France, and Exchange of Letters
- 1981 – Exchange of Letters constituting an Agreement between the Government of Australia and the Government of New Zealand further extending the Agreement on Tariffs and Tariff Preferences of 25 November 1977
- 1981 – Agreement between the Government of Australia and the Government of the Kingdom of Denmark for the Avoidance of Double Taxation and the Prevention of Fiscal Evasion with respect to Taxes on Income
- 1981 – Agreement between the Government of Australia and the Government of New Zealand to amend the Christmas Island Agreement of 30 September 1958
- 1981 – Exchange of Notes constituting an Agreement between the Government of Australia and the Government of the Republic of Singapore to further extend the operation of Article 18(3) of the Agreement for the Avoidance of Double Taxation and the Prevention of Fiscal Evasion with respect to Taxes on Income of 11 February 1969
- 1982 – Agreement between the Government of Australia and the Government of the People's Republic of China on the Reciprocal Exchange of Sites for Construction of Diplomatic Compounds
- 1982 – Agreement between the Government of Australia and the Government of the United States of America relating to Cooperation on Antitrust Matters
- 1982 – Exchange of Notes constituting an Agreement between the Government of Australia and the Government of the Republic of Singapore to amend the Agreement concerning the Provision of Treatment in Singapore Hospitals for Asian Residents of Christmas Island of 27 June 1968
- 1982 – Agreement between the Government of Australia and the Government of Japan concerning Japanese Tuna Long-Line Fishing
- 1982 – Exchange of Letters constituting an Agreement between the Government of Australia and the Government of the State of Israel concerning the Immunities of Australian Military Members of the Multinational Force and Observers while on Leave in Israel
- 1982 – Agreement between the Government of Australia and the Government of Japan for Co-operation in the Peaceful Uses of Nuclear Energy
- 1982 – Agreement between Australia and the United States of America regarding the Importation of Meat into the United States of America during 1982
- 1982 – Exchange of Notes constituting an Agreement further amending the Agreement relating to the establishment of a United States Naval Communication Station in Australia of 9 May 1963, as amended
- 1982 – Agreement on Economic and Technical Cooperation between the Government of Australia and the Government of the State of Kuwait
- 1983 – Basic Agreement between the Government of Australia and the Government of the United Mexican States on Scientific and Technical Co-operation
- 1983 – Agreement between the Government of Australia and the Government of the French Republic concerning the Establishment of a French – Australian School in Canberra
- 1983 – Subsidiary Agreement between the Government of Australia and the Government of Japan concerning Japanese Tuna Long-Line Fishing
- 1983 – Exchange of Notes constituting an Agreement between the Government of Australia and the Government of the United States of America regarding the Importation of Meat into the United States of America during 1983
- 1983 – Convention between the Government of Australia and the Government of the United States of America for the Avoidance of Double Taxation and the Prevention of Fiscal Evasion with respect to Taxes on Income
- 1983 – Exchange of Notes constituting an Agreement between the Government of Australia and the Government of the United States of America further extending the Agreement relating to Scientific and Technical Co-operation of 16 October 1968
- 1983 – Convention between Australia and the Kingdom of Norway for the Avoidance of Double Taxation and the Prevention of Fiscal Evasion with respect to Taxes on Income and on Capital, and Protocol
- 1983 – Agreement between the Government of Australia and the Government of the Republic of India for the Avoidance of Double Taxation of Income derived from International Air Transport
- 1983 – Agreement on Fisheries between the Government of Australia and the Government of the Republic of Korea, and Exchange of Letters
- 1983 – Agreement between the Government of Australia and the Government of Ireland for the Avoidance of Double Taxation and the Prevention of Fiscal Evasion with respect to Taxes on Income and Capital Gains
- 1983 – Exchange of Letters constituting an Agreement between the Government of Australia and the Government of New Zealand concerning the Supply of Phosphate from Christmas Island
- 1983 – Agreement between the Government of Australia and the Government of New Zealand to provide for the Termination of the Christmas Island Agreement of 30 September 1958
- 1984 – Convention between the Government of Australia and the Government of the Republic of Korea for the Avoidance of Double Taxation and the Prevention of Fiscal Evasion with respect to Taxes on Income, and Protocol
- 1984 – Exchange of Notes constituting an Agreement between the Government of Australia and the Government of the United States of America to amend the Agreement regarding the Management and Operation of the Joint Geological and Geophysical Research Station at Alice Springs of 28 February 1978
- 1984 – Agreement between the Government of Australia and the Government of the People's Republic of China on Agricultural Co-operation
- 1984 – Exchange of Notes between the Government of Australia and the Government of the United States of America constituting an Agreement to extend the Agreement relating to Scientific and Technical Cooperation of 16 October 1968
- 1984 – Exchange of Notes constituting an Agreement between the Government of Australia and the Government of the United States of America concerning Access to the Repair and Maintenance Facilities of Australian Ports to United States Fishing Vessels
- 1984 – Subsidiary Agreement between the Government of Australia and the Government of the Republic of Korea concerning Squid Jigging by Fishing Vessels of the Republic of Korea
- 1984 – Protocol between the Government of Australia and the Government of the People's Republic of China on a Program of Co-operation in Agricultural Research for Development
- 1984 – Economic and Commercial Co-operation Agreement between the Government of Australia and the Government of the Republic of Italy
- 1984 – Agreement on Economic and Technical Co-operation in the Iron and Steel Industry between the Government of Australia and the Government of the People's Republic of China
- 1984 – Subsidiary Agreement between the Government of Australia and the Government of Japan concerning Japanese Long-Line Tuna Fishing
- 1984 – Exchange of Notes constituting an Agreement between the Government of Australia and the Government of the United States of America concerning the Use of Balloon Launching Facilities in Australia
- 1984 – Exchange of Notes constituting an Agreement between the Government of Australia and the Government of the United States of America on Employment Opportunities for Dependants of Officials Overseas
- 1984 – Exchange of Notes constituting an Agreement between the Government of Australia and the Government of the United States of America further extending the Agreement relating to Scientific and Technical Co-operation of 18 October 1984
- 1985 – Treaty between Australia and the Independent State of Papua New Guinea concerning Sovereignty and Maritime Boundaries in the area between the two Countries, including the area known as Torres Strait, and Related Matters
- 1985 – Agreement between the Government of Australia and the Government of the United States of America concerning the furnishing of Launch and Associated Services for Australia's National Satellite System
- 1985 – Exchange of Notes constituting an Agreement between the Government of Australia and the Government of the People's Republic of China on the Establishment of additional Consulates-General in their Respective Countries
- 1985 – Exchange of Notes constituting an Agreement between the Government of Australia and the Government of Japan concerning Co-operation on the Project for the Geostationary Meteorological Satellite-3 System
- 1985 – Agreement between Australia and Malta for the Avoidance of Double Taxation and the Prevention of Fiscal Evasion with respect to Taxes on Income
- 1985 – Agreement between the Government of Australia and the Government of the French Republic relating to the Exchange and Communication of Classified Information
- 1985 – Agreement between the Government of Australia and the Government of the Kingdom of Sweden concerning the Protection of Classified Information of Defence Interest
- 1985 – Exchanges of Notes constituting Agreements between the Government of Australia and the Government of the United States of America concerning the Application of the Agreement concerning Peaceful Uses of Nuclear Energy of 5 July 1979
- 1985 – Exchange of Notes constituting an Agreement between the Government of Australia and the Government of the United States of America relating to the Launching of Long Duration Balloon Flights beyond Australia for Scientific Purposes
- 1985 – Subsidiary Agreement between the Government of Australia and the Government of Japan concerning Japanese Tuna Long-Line Fishing
- 1985 – Convention between Australia and the Republic of Italy for the Avoidance of Double Taxation and the Prevention of Fiscal Evasion with respect to Taxes on Income, and Protocol
- 1985 – Exchange of Notes constituting an Agreement extending the Agreement between Australia and Japan on Co-operation in Research and Development in Science and Technology
- 1985 – Subsidiary Agreement between the Government of Australia and the Government of the Republic of Korea concerning Squid Jigging by Fishing Vessels of the Republic of Korea
- 1985 – Exchange of Notes constituting an Agreement between the Government of Australia and the Government of the Republic of Singapore to terminate the Agreement concerning the Provision of Treatment in Singapore Hospitals for Asian Residents of Christmas Island of 27 June 1968
- 1985 – Exchange of Notes constituting an Agreement between the Government of Australia and the Government of the United States of America to extend and amend the Agreement relating to Scientific and Technical Cooperation of 16 October 1968

== 1986–2000 bilateral treaties ==
- 1986 – Exchange of Letters constituting an Agreement between the Government of Australia and the Government of the United Kingdom of Great Britain and Northern Ireland to amend Article 10 of the Agreement to provide for the Establishment and Operation in Australia of a Large Optical Telescope of 25 September 1969
- 1986 – Agreement between Australia and Finland for the Avoidance of Double Taxation and the Prevention of Fiscal Evasion with respect to Taxes on Income, and Protocol
- 1986 – Agreement on Health Services between the Government of Australia and the Government of the United Kingdom of Great Britain and Northern Ireland
- 1986 – Agreement on Medical Treatment between the Government of Australia and the Government of New Zealand
- 1986 – Agreement between the Government of Australia and the Government of the Republic of India on Co-operation in the Fields of Science and Technology
- 1986 – Exchange of Notes constituting an Agreement between the Government of Australia and the Government of the Republic of Korea to amend Articles I and III of the Subsidiary Agreement concerning Squid Jigging by Fishing Vessels of the Republic of Korea of 28 November 1985
- 1986 – Exchange of Notes constituting an Agreement between the Government of Australia and the Government of Canada for Sharing Consular Services Abroad
- 1986 – Protocol amending the Agreement between Australia and the Kingdom of Belgium for the Avoidance of Double Taxation and the Prevention of Fiscal Evasion with respect to Taxes on Income of 13 October 1977
- 1986 – Agreement between the Government of Australia and the Government of the Union of Soviet Socialist Republics on Co-operation in Agriculture
- 1986 – Subsidiary Agreement between the Government of Australia and the Government of Japan concerning Japanese Tuna Long-line Fishing
- 1986 – Subsidiary Agreement between the Government of Australia and the Government of the Republic of Korea concerning Squid Jigging by Fishing Vessels of the Republic of Korea
- 1986 – Agreement between the Government of Australia and the Government of the People's Republic of China for the Avoidance of Double Taxation of Income and Revenues derived by Air Transport Enterprises from International Air Transport
- 1987 – Exchange of Notes constituting an Agreement between the Government of Australia and the Government of the United Kingdom of Great Britain and Northern Ireland to further amend the Agreement on Social Security of 29 January 1958
- 1987 – Exchanges of Notes constituting Agreements between the Government of Australia and the Government of the United States of America concerning the Conduct of the Equatorial Mesoscale Experiment [EMEX] and the Stratosphere-Troposphere Exchange Project [STEP]
- 1987 – Agreement between the Government of Australia and the Government of New Zealand on Seismic Monitoring Cooperation
- 1987 – Exchange of Notes constituting an Agreement between the Government of Australia and the Government of the Federal Republic of Germany on the Launching of Sounding Rockets
- 1987 – Exchange of Notes constituting an Agreement between the Government of Australia and the Government of the United States of America on the Launching of Sounding Rockets
- 1987 – Agreement between the Government of Australia and the Government of New Zealand providing for Reciprocity in Matters relating to Social Security
- 1987 – Subsidiary Agreement between the Government of Australia and the Government of Japan concerning Japanese Tuna Long-Line Fishing
- 1987 – ATS 1987 21 – Exchange of Letters constituting an Agreement between the Government of Australia and the Government of the United States of America relating to the Limitation of Australian Exports of Meat to the United States of America during 1987
- 1987 – Second Protocol amending the Agreement between Australia and the Kingdom of the Netherlands for the Avoidance of Double Taxation and the Prevention of Fiscal Evasion with respect to Taxes on Income, and Protocol
- 1987 – Subsidiary Agreement between the Government of Australia and the Government of the Republic of Korea concerning Squid Jigging by Fishing Vessels of the Republic of Korea
- 1987 – Agreement between the Government of Australia and the Government of the Union of Soviet Socialist Republics on Co-operation in the Field of Medical Science and Public Health
- 1987 – Agreement between the Government of Australia and the Government of the Union of Soviet Socialist Republics on Co-operation in Space Research and the Use of Space for Peaceful Purposes
- 1988 – Exchange of Notes constituting a Status of Forces Agreement between the Government of Australia and the Government of the Republic of Singapore
- 1988 – Agreement on Health Services between the Government of Australia and the Government of the Republic of Malta
- 1988 – Agreement between the Government of Australia and the Government of the People's Republic of China on the Reciprocal Encouragement and Protection of Investments
- 1988 – Agreement between the Government of Australia and the Government of the Swiss Confederation concerning the Peaceful Uses of Nuclear Energy, and Two Exchanges of Letters
- 1988 – Agreement between Australia and the Republic of Austria for the Avoidance of Double Taxation and the Prevention of Fiscal Evasion with respect to Taxes on Income
- 1988 – Agreement between the Government of Australia and the Government of the People's Republic of China for the Protection of Migratory Birds and their Environment
- 1988 – Agreement between Australia and the Republic of Italy providing for Reciprocity in Matters relating to Social Security
- 1988 – Reciprocal Agreement between Australia and Italy in the matter of Health Assistance
- 1988 – Subsidiary Agreement between the Government of Australia and the Government of Japan concerning Japanese Tuna Long-Line Fishing
- 1988 – Exchange of Notes constituting an Agreement between the Government of Australia and the Government of the United States of America amending the Agreement on the Establishment of a Joint Space Research Facility of 9 December 1966, as amended [Pine Gap]
- 1988 – Exchange of Notes constituting an Agreement between the Government of Australia and the Government of the United States of America amending the Agreement on the Establishment of a Joint Defence Communications Station of 10 December 1969 [Nurrungar]
- 1988 – Exchange of Notes constituting an Agreement between the Government of Australia and the Government of the United States of America to amend the Agreement on the Financing of Certain Educational and Cultural Exchange Programmes of 28 August 1964, as amended
- 1988 – Agreement on Fisheries between the Government of Australia and the Government of the People's Republic of China
- 1988 – Exchange of Letters constituting an Agreement between the Government of Australia and the Government of the United States of America concerning Meat Exports by Australia to the United States of America during 1988
- 1988 – Exchange of Notes constituting an Agreement between the Government of Australia and the Government of the United States of America on Access to the Australian Fishing Zone
- 1989 – Agreement between the Government of Australia and the Government of New Zealand for the Reciprocal Protection of Classified Information of Defence Interest
- 1989 – Agreement on Development Co-operation between the Government of Australia and the Government of the Kingdom of Thailand
- 1989 – Agreement on Medical Treatment for Temporary Visitors between the Government of Australia and the Government of the Kingdom of Sweden
- 1989 – Exchange of Notes constituting an Agreement between the Government of Australia and the Government of the United States of America concerning [Airline] Capacity
- 1989 – Agreement between the Government of Australia and the Government of New Zealand providing for Reciprocity in Matters Relating to Social Security
- 1989 – Scientific and Technological Agreement between the Government of Australia and the Government of the French Republic
- 1989 – Agreement between the Government of Australia and the Government of Solomon Islands establishing Certain Sea and Seabed Boundaries
- 1989 – Agreement between the Government of Australia and the Government of the Arab Republic of Egypt concerning Cooperation in the Peaceful Uses of Nuclear Energy and the Transfer of Nuclear Material between Australia and the Arab Republic of Egypt, and Agreed Minutes
- 1989 – Exchange of Letters constituting an Accord between the Government of Australia and the Government of the Union of Soviet Socialist Republics relating to Co-operation in Civil Aviation
- 1989 – Reciprocal Agreement on Social Security between the Government of Australia and the Government of Canada
- 1989 – Protocol between the Government of Australia and the Government of Thailand concerning the Financing of a Railway Project in Thailand
- 1989 – Treaty on Development Co-operation between the Government of Australia and the Government of Papua New Guinea, and Exchange of Letters
- 1989 – Exchange of Notes constituting an Agreement between the Government of Australia and the Government of the Republic of Singapore to further extend the operation of Article 18(3) of the Agreement for the Avoidance of Double Taxation and the Prevention of Fiscal Evasion with respect to Taxes on Income of 11 February 1969
- 1989 – Agreement between the Government of Australia and the Government of the United States of America concerning Defense Logistic Support
- 1989 – Agreement between the Government of Australia and the Government of the United States of America concerning Defense Communications Services
- 1989 – Exchange of Notes constituting an Agreement between the Government of Australia and the Government of the United States of America concerning Australian Ores containing Uranium or Thorium [monazite and xenotime]
- 1989 – Agreement between Australia and New Zealand concerning Collaboration in the Acquisition of Surface Combatants for the Royal Australian Navy and the Royal New Zealand Navy (ANZAC Frigates Agreement)
- 1989 – Subsidiary Agreement between the Government of Australia and the Government of Japan concerning Japanese Tuna Long-Line Fishing
- 1989 – Exchange of Notes constituting an Agreement between the Government of Australia and the Government of the Republic of Singapore concerning Cooperation on the Physical Protection of Nuclear Materials
- 1989 – Agreement between Australia and the Kingdom of Thailand for the Avoidance of Double Taxation and the Prevention of Fiscal Evasion with respect to Taxes on Income
- 1989 – Agreement between Australia and the Independent State of Papua New Guinea for the Avoidance of Double Taxation and the Prevention of Fiscal Evasion with respect to Taxes on Income
- 1990 – Protocol amending the Agreement between the Government of the Commonwealth of Australia and the Government of the Republic of Singapore for the Avoidance of Double Taxation and the Prevention of Fiscal Evasion with respect to Taxes on Income of 11 February 1969
- 1990 – Agreement between the Government of Australia and the Government of the United States of America concerning Cooperating Communications Networks
- 1990 – Agreement between the Government of Australia and the Government of the Union of Soviet Socialist Republics on Human Contacts and Humanitarian Co-operation, and Protocol
- 1990 – Agreement between the Government of Australia and the Government of the Union of Soviet Socialist Republics relating to Co-operation in Fisheries
- 1990 – Agreement between the Government of Australia and the Government of the Union of Soviet Socialist Republics on the Supply of Agricultural and Mineral Commodities from Australia to the Union of Soviet Socialist Republics
- 1990 – Agreement between the Government of Australia and the Government of the Union of Soviet Socialist Republics on Cooperation in the Field of Protection and Enhancement of the Environment
- 1990 – Exchange of Notes constituting an Agreement between the Government of Australia and the Government of the United States of America to amend and extend the Agreement concerning Space Vehicle Tracking and Communication Facilities of 29 May 1980
- 1990 – Agreement between the Government of Australia and the Government of the United States of America concerning Cooperative Development of the Digital Chart of the World
- 1990 – Protocol amending the Agreement between the Government of Australia and the Government of the French Republic for the Avoidance of Double Taxation and the Prevention of Fiscal Evasion with respect to Taxes on Income of 13 April 1976
- 1990 – Exchange of Notes constituting an Agreement between the Government of Australia and the Government of Japan to amend the Exchange of Letters constituting an Agreement establishing an Implementing Arrangement pursuant to the Agreement for Co-operation in the Peaceful Uses of Nuclear Energy of 5 March 1982
- 1990 – Exchange of Letters constituting an Agreement between the Government of Australia and the Government of Japan concerning Co-operation on the Project for the Geostationary Meteorological Satellite-4 System
- 1990 – Agreement on Economic Cooperation between the Government of Australia and the Government of the Kingdom of Thailand
- 1990 – Convention relating to the Distribution of Programme-Carrying Signals Transmitted by Satellite
- 1990 – Subsidiary Agreement between the Government of Australia and the Government of Japan concerning Japanese Tuna Long-Line Fishing
- 1990 – Films Co-Production Agreement between the Government of Australia and the Government of Canada
- 1990 – Agreement between the Government of Australia and the Government of the Republic of India on Development Co-operation
- 1990 – Agreement between the Government of Australia and the Government of the Republic of France concerning Collaboration on Defence Research and Technology
- 1990 – Agreement between the Government of Australia and the Government of the Union of Soviet Socialist Republics concerning the Peaceful Uses of Nuclear Energy
- 1990 – Agreement between Australia and Fiji for the Avoidance of Double Taxation and the Prevention of Fiscal Evasion with respect to Taxes on Income
- 1990 – Agreement between the Government of Australia and the Government of the People's Republic of China for the Avoidance of Double Taxation and the Prevention of Fiscal Evasion with respect to Taxes on Income (Canberra, 17 November 1988)
- 1990 – Exchange of Notes constituting an Agreement between the Government of Australia and the Government of the Union of Soviet Socialist Republics amending Article IV.3 of the Agreement on Co-operation in Agriculture of 20 November 1986
- 1990 – Exchange of Notes constituting an Agreement between the Government of Australia and the Government of the People's Republic of China to amend Article 3 of the Agreement on a Program of Technical Co-operation for Development of 2 October 1981
- 1990 – Exchange of Notes constituting an Agreement between the Government of Australia and the Government of the United States of America to further extend the Agreement relating to Scientific and Technical Co-operation of 16 October 1968, as extended and amended
- 1991 – Exchange of Notes constituting an Agreement between the Government of Australia and the Government of Sweden concerning Arrangements applying to Certain [nuclear] Transfers between Sweden and Third Countries
- 1991 – Agreement between the Government of Australia and the Government of the United States of America concerning NAVSTAR Global Positioning System
- 1991 – Agreement between the Government of Australia and the Government of New Zealand concerning Cooperation in Defence Logistics Support
- 1991 – Agreement on Cultural, Educational and Scientific Co-operation between Australia and Spain
- 1991 – Agreement between Australia and Spain on Social Security
- 1991 – Agreement between Australia and Malta on Social Security
- 1991 – Films Co-production Agreement between the Government of Australia and the Government of the United Kingdom of Great Britain and Northern Ireland
- 1991 – Project Agreement between the Government of Australia and the Government of the United States of America concerning Sensor Fusion System Development
- 1991 – Agreement between the Government of Australia and the Government of Hong Kong concerning the Investigation of Drug Trafficking and the Confiscation of the Proceeds of Drug Trafficking
- 1991 – Agreement between Australia and the Republic of Kiribati for the Avoidance of Double Taxation and the Prevention of Fiscal Evasion with respect to Taxes on Income
- 1991 – Agreement between the Government of Australia and the Government of the Islamic Republic of Pakistan on Development Co-operation
- 1991 – Agreement between Australia and the Socialist Republic of Vietnam on the Reciprocal Promotion and Protection of Investments
- 1991 – Agreement between the Government of Australia and the Government of the Independent State of Papua New Guinea for the Promotion and Protection of Investments
- 1991 – Agreement between Australia and the Democratic Socialist Republic of Sri Lanka for the Avoidance of Double Taxation and the Prevention of Fiscal Evasion with respect to Taxes on Income
- 1991 – Agreement between Australia and New Zealand concerning the Establishment of the Council of the Joint Accreditation System of Australia and New Zealand (JAS-ANZ)
- 1991 – Exchange of Notes constituting an Agreement between the Government of Australia and the Government of the United States of America concerning Meat Exports by Australia to the United States of America during 1991
- 1991 – Subsidiary Agreement between the Government of Australia and the Government of Japan concerning Japanese Tuna Long-Line Fishing
- 1991 – Exchange of Notes constituting an Agreement between the Government of Australia and the Government of the United States of America to bring International Obligation Exchanges under the Coverage of the Agreement concerning Peaceful Uses of Nuclear Energy, and Agreed Minute, of 5 July 1979
- 1991 – Agreement between the Government of Australia and the Government of the Republic of India for the Avoidance of Double Taxation and the Prevention of Fiscal Evasion with respect to Taxes on Income
- 1992 – Agreement between the Government of Australia and the Government of the Kingdom of the Netherlands concerning the Provision of Medical Treatment
- 1992 – Protocol amending the Reciprocal Agreement on Social Security between the Government of Australia and the Government of Canada of 4 July 1988
- 1992 – Agreement between Australia and the Kingdom of the Netherlands on Social Security
- 1992 – Exchange of Notes constituting an Agreement between the Government of Australia and the Government of the United States of America to amend Article 5 of the Agreement for the Financing of Certain Educational and Cultural Exchange Programmes of 28 August 1964, as amended
- 1992 – Agreement between Australia and Ireland on Social Security
- 1992 – Agreement between Australia and the Republic of Poland on the Reciprocal Promotion and Protection of Investments
- 1992 – Agreement between the Government of Australia and the Government of the United States of America concerning Cooperation in Radar Activities
- 1992 – Agreement between Australia and the Republic of Poland for the Avoidance of Double Taxation and the Prevention of Fiscal Evasion with respect to Taxes on Income
- 1992 – Agreement on Social Security between the Government of Australia and the Government of the United Kingdom of Great Britain and Northern Ireland
- 1992 – Agreement between Australia and the Republic of Hungary for the Avoidance of Double Taxation and the Prevention of Fiscal Evasion with respect to Taxes on Income
- 1992 – Agreement between Australia and the Republic of Hungary on the Reciprocal Promotion and Protection of Investments
- 1992 – Exchange of Notes constituting an Agreement to further amend the Agreement between the Government of Australia and the Government of the United States of America relating to the Establishment of a United States Naval Communication Station in Australia of 9 May 1963, as amended (North West Cape)
- 1992 – Exchange of Letters constituting an Agreement to amend the Treaty on Development Co-operation between the Government of Australia and the Government of Papua New Guinea, and Exchange of Letters, of 24 May 1989
- 1992 – Exchange of Notes constituting an Agreement between the Government of Australia and the Government of the United States of America concerning the Conduct of Scientific Balloon Flights
- 1992 – Agreement between the Government of Australia and the Government of the United Mexican States concerning Cooperation in Peaceful Uses of Nuclear Energy and the Transfer of Nuclear Material
- 1992 – Exchange of Notes constituting an Agreement between the Government of Australia and the Government of the United States of America concerning Meat Exports by Australia to the United States of America during 1992
- 1992 – Agreement between Australia and the Republic of Austria on Social Security
- 1992 – Agreement between the Government of Australia and the Government of the Republic of Portugal on Social Security
- 1992 – Agreement between the Government of Australia and the Government of the United States of America concerning the Exchange of Electronic Warfare Officers between the Department of Defence of Australia and the Department of Defense of the United States of America
- 1992 – Exchange of Letters constituting an Agreement between the Government of Australia and the Government of Papua New Guinea pursuant to Articles 3–5 of the Treaty on Development Co-operation of 24 May 1989
- 1992 – Agreement between the Government of Australia and the Government of the Republic of Indonesia for the Avoidance of Double Taxation and the Prevention of Fiscal Evasion with respect to Taxes on Income
- 1992 – Agreement between Australia and the Kingdom of Spain for the Avoidance of Double Taxation and the Prevention of Fiscal Evasion with respect to Taxes on Income, and Protocol
- 1992 – Subsidiary Agreement between the Government of Australia and the Government of Japan concerning Japanese Tuna Long-Line Fishing
- 1992 – Agreement between the Government of Australia and the Government of the Socialist Republic of Vietnam for the Avoidance of Double Taxation and the Prevention of Fiscal Evasion with respect to Taxes on Income
- 1993 – Agreement on Social Security between Australia and the Republic of Cyprus
- 1993 – Exchange of Notes constituting an Agreement between the Government of Australia and the Government of the United States of America concerning Meat Exports by Australia to the United States of America in 1993
- 1993 – Agreement between the Government of Australia and the Government of the Republic of Singapore for Cooperation in Defence Science and Technology
- 1993 – Agreement between the Government of Australia and the Government of the Republic of Indonesia relating to Cooperation in Fisheries
- 1993 – Agreement between the Government of Australia and the Government of the Republic of Indonesia concerning the Promotion and Protection of Investments, and Exchange of Letters
- 1993 – Agreement on Medical Treatment for Temporary Visitors between Australia and the Republic of Finland (Canberra, 6 August 1992)
- 1993 – Agreement between the Government of Australia and the Government of the Republic of Indonesia concerning the Protection and Enforcement of Copyright
- 1993 – Agreement between the Government of Australia and the Government of Hong Kong for the Promotion and Protection of Investments
- 1993 – Exchange of Notes constituting an Agreement to extend the Agreement between the Government of Australia and the Government of Hong Kong concerning the Investigation of Drug Trafficking and the Confiscation of the Proceeds of Drug Trafficking of 22 April 1991
- 1993 – Exchange of Notes constituting an Agreement between the Government of Australia and the Government of the United Kingdom of Great Britain and Northern Ireland concerning Maralinga and other Sites in Australia
- 1993 – Subsidiary Agreement between the Government of Australia and the Government of Japan concerning Japanese Tuna Long-Line Fishing
- 1994 – Exchange of Letters constituting an Agreement between the Government of Australia and the Government of the United Kingdom of Great Britain and Northern Ireland relating to Nauru
- 1994 – Agreement between the Government of Australia and the Government of Romania on the Reciprocal Promotion and Protection of Investments
- 1994 – Rehabilitation and Development Co-operation Agreement between the Government of Australia and the Government of the Republic of Nauru
- 1994 – Exchange of Letters constituting an Agreement between the Government of Australia and the Government of New Zealand relating to Nauru
- 1994 – Agreement between Australia and the Czech Republic on the Reciprocal Promotion and Protection of Investments
- 1994 – Exchange of Letters constituting an Agreement to further amend the Treaty on Development Cooperation between the Government of Australia and the Government of Papua New Guinea, and Exchange of Letters, of 24 May 1989
- 1994 – Agreement between the Government of Australia and the Government of the Republic of Estonia on Economic and Commercial Cooperation
- 1994 – Agreement between the Government of Australia and the Government of the French Republic on a Programme involving the Establishment and Use of the "DORIS" Precise Satellite Location Beacon System in Australia
- 1994 – Agreement between the Government of Australia and the Government of the United States of America concerning Co-operative and Collaborative Research, Development and Engineering
- 1994 – Exchange of Notes constituting an Agreement to further extend the Agreement between the Government of Australia and the Government of Hong Kong concerning the Investigation of Drug Trafficking and the Confiscation of the Proceeds of Drug Trafficking of 22 April 1991
- 1994 – Subsidiary Agreement between the Government of Australia and the Government of Japan concerning Japanese Tuna Long-Line Fishing
- 1995 – Agreement between the Government of Australia and the Government of New Zealand on Social Security
- 1995 – Agreement between Australia and the Lao People's Democratic Republic on the Reciprocal Promotion and Protection of Investments
- 1995 – Agreement between the Government of Australia and the Government of the Federal Republic of Germany concerning the Landing and Recovery of a Space Capsule in Australia (EXPRESS Agreement), and Exchange of Notes
- 1995 – Agreement between the Government of Australia and the Government of the Republic of Singapore concerning the Use of Shoalwater Bay Training Area and the Associated Use of Storage Facilities in Australia
- 1995 – Agreement for the Provision of Personnel to Support De-Mining Programmes in Cambodia between the Government of Australia and the United Nations Development Programme
- 1995 – Exchange of Letters constituting an Agreement to amend Article 1(1) of the Agreement on Medical Treatment for Temporary Visitors between the Government of Australia and the Government of the Kingdom of Sweden of 14 February 1989
- 1995 – Exchange of Notes constituting an Agreement between the Government of Australia and the Government of the United States of America concerning the continued Operation in South-Eastern Australia of the Omega Navigation Facility
- 1995 – Exchange of Notes Constituting an Agreement to Amend, and to Provide for International Obligation Exchanges Under, the Agreement Between the Government of Australia and the Government of Canada Concerning the Peaceful Uses of Nuclear Energy of 9 March 1981
- 1995 – Memorandum of Agreement between the Government of Australia and the Government of the United States of America concerning Reciprocal Defense Procurement
- 1995 – Agreement between the Government of Australia and the Government of the Republic of the Philippines on the Promotion and Protection of Investments, and Protocol
- 1995 – Agreement between Australia and the Czech Republic for the Avoidance of Double Taxation and the Prevention of Fiscal Evasion with respect to Taxes on Income
- 1995 – Exchange of Notes constituting an Agreement to further extend the Agreement between the Government of Australia and the Government of Hong Kong concerning the Investigation of Drug Trafficking and the Confiscation of the Proceeds of Drug Trafficking of 22 April 1991
- 1995 – Exchange of Letters constituting an Agreement between the Government of Australia and the Government of Papua New Guinea pursuant to Articles 3–5 of the Treaty on Development Co-operation of 24 May 1989
- 1995 – First Protocol to the Agreement between the Government of Australia and the Government of New Zealand on Social Security of 19 July 1994
- 1995 – Exchange of Notes constituting an Agreement between the Government of Australia and the Korean Peninsula Energy Development Organization (KEDO) regarding an Australian Financial Contribution to KEDO
- 1995 – Exchange of Notes constituting an Agreement between the Government of Australia and the Government of the United States of America concerning certain Mutual Defence Commitments (Chapeau Defence Agreement)
- 1996 – Second Protocol to the Agreement between the Government of Australia and the Government of New Zealand on Social Security of 19 July 1994
- 1996 – Subsidiary Agreement between the Government of Australia and the Government of Japan concerning Japanese Tuna Long-Line Fishing
- 1996 – Agreement between the Government of Australia and the Government of New Zealand establishing a System for the Development of Joint Food Standards
- 1996 – Agreement between the Government of Australia and the Government of the Republic of Indonesia on Maintaining Security
- 1996 – Agreement between the Government of Australia and the Government of Canada concerning the Protection of Defence Related Information exchanged Between Them
- 1996 – Agreement between the Government of Australia and the Government of the Republic of Indonesia for Cooperation in Scientific Research and Technological Development (Canberra, 24 August 1994)
- 1996 – Films Co-Production Agreement between the Government of Australia and the Government of Italy
- 1997 – Agreement between the Government of Australia and the Government of the Argentine Republic on the Promotion and Protection of Investments, and Protocol
- 1997 – Agreement between the Government of Australia and the Government of the People's Republic of China concerning the Maintenance of the Consulate-General of Australia in the Hong Kong Special Administrative Region of the People's Republic of China
- 1997 – Agreement between Australia and the Republic of Peru on the Promotion and Protection of Investments, and Protocol
- 1997 – Subsidiary Agreement between the Government of Australia and the Government of Japan concerning Japanese Tuna Long-Line Fishing
- 1997 – Agreement between the Government of Australia and the Government of the Republic of Singapore for the Reciprocal Protection of Classified Information transmitted between the Australian Department of Defence and the Singapore
- 1997 – Exchange of Notes constituting an Agreement between the Government of Australia and the Government of the Socialist Republic of Vietnam to amend the Agreement for the Avoidance of Double Taxation and the Prevention of Fiscal
- 1997 – Agreement between the Government of Australia and the Government of New Zealand for the Avoidance of Double Taxation and the Prevention of Fiscal Evasion with respect to Taxes on Income
- 1997 – Exchange of Letters constituting an Agreement between the Government of Australia and the Government of New Zealand amending the Agreement concerning Collaboration in the Acquisition of Surface Combatants for the Royal
- 1997 – Exchange of Notes constituting an Agreement between the Government of Australia and the Government of the Republic of Korea concerning the Retransfer of Australian Obligated Nuclear Material under the Agreement concerning Cooperation in Peaceful Uses of Nuclear Energy and the Transfer of Nuclear Material of 2 May 1979
- 1997 – Project Arrangement between the Government of Australia and the Government of the United States of America on Data Fusion for Over-the-Horizon Radar
- 1997 – Agreement between Australia, Papua New Guinea, New Zealand, Fiji and Vanuatu concerning the Neutral Truce Monitoring Group for Bougainville
- 1998 – Films Co-Production Agreement between the Government of Australia and the Government of the State of Israel
- 1998 – General Agreement on Development Cooperation between the Government of Australia and the Government of the Republic of the Philippines
- 1998 – Agreement on Medical Treatment for Temporary Visitors between Australia and Ireland
- 1998 – Exchange of Letters constituting an Agreement between the Government of Australia and the Government of the Republic of Malta to amend the Agreement on Health Services of 6 July 1988
- 1998 – Agreement between Australia and New Zealand concerning the Establishment of the Governing Board, Technical Advisory Council and Accreditation Review Board of the Joint Accreditation System of Australia and New Zealand
- 1998 – Agreement on Judicial Assistance in Civil and Commercial Matters and Co-operation in Arbitration between Australia and the Kingdom of Thailand
- 1998 – Agreement between Australia and the Kingdom of the Netherlands on Gainful Employment of Dependants of Diplomatic and Consular Personnel
- 1998 – Films Co-Production Agreement between the Government of Australia and the Government of Ireland
- 1998 – Agreement between Australia and the Islamic Republic of Pakistan on the Promotion and Protection of Investments
- 1999 – Exchange of Notes constituting an Agreement between the Government of Australia and the Government of the Republic of Singapore to amend [Article 3(6) of] the Agreement concerning the Use of Shoalwater Bay Training Are
- 1999 – Exchange of Letters constituting an Agreement between the Government of Australia and the Government of the Republic of France relating to the Movement of Nationals between the Two Countries
- 1999 – Agreement between the Government of Australia and the Government of the United States of America concerning Defense Communications Services
- 1999 – General Agreement on Development Cooperation between the Government of Australia and the Government of the Republic of Indonesia
- 1999 – Agreement between the Government of Australia and the Government of Malaysia concerning the Status of Forces
- 1999 – Agreement on Medical Treatment for Temporary Visitors between the Government of Australia and the Government of New Zealand
- 1999 – Agreement between the Government of Australia and the Government of the Republic of Chile on Gainful Employment of Dependants of Diplomatic and Consular Personnel
- 1999 – Agreement between the Government of Australia and the Government of the United States of America concerning Acquisition and Cross-Servicing
- 1999 – Agreement between the Government of Australia and the Government of the United States of America on Mutual Antitrust Enforcement Assistance
- 1999 – Exchange of Letters constituting an Agreement between the Government of Australia and the Government of Malaysia prolonging the effect of Certain Provisions of the Agreement for the Avoidance of Double Taxation and th
- 1999 – Exchange of Notes constituting an Agreement between the Government of Australia and the Government of Japan to further amend the Exchange of Letters constituting an Agreement establishing an Implementing Arrangement p
- 1999 – Agreement between the Government of Australia and the Government of the People's Republic of China concerning the Continuation of the Consular Functions by Australia in the Macau Special Administrative Region of the P
- 1999 – Agreement between the Government of Australia and the Government of the Republic of South Africa for the Avoidance of Double Taxation and the Prevention of Fiscal Evasion with respect to Taxes on Income, and Protocol
- 1999 – Agreement between Australia and the Slovak Republic for the Avoidance of Double Taxation and the Prevention of Fiscal Evasion with respect to Taxes on Income
- 1999 – Agreement between the Government of Australia and the Government of the Argentine Republic for the Avoidance of Double Taxation and the Prevention of Fiscal Evasion with respect to Taxes on Income, and Protocol
- 1999 – Agreement between the Government of Australia and the Government of the Republic of Chile on the Reciprocal Promotion and Protection of Investments, and Protocol
- 2000 – Exchange of Notes constituting an Agreement between the Government of Australia and the Government of New Zealand to amend the Agreement on Social Security of 19 July 1994, as amended
- 2000 – Treaty on Judicial Assistance in Civil and Commercial Matters between Australia and the Republic of Korea
- 2000 – Agreement between the Government of Australia and the Government of the Republic of Singapore concerning the Use of Shoalwater Bay Training Area and the Associated Use of Storage Facilities in Australia
- 2000 – Agreement between the Government of Australia and the Government of the Republic of Korea on Scientific and Technological Co-operation (Canberra, 17 September 1999)
- 2000 – Agreement between the Government of Australia and the Government of the Republic of India on the Promotion and Protection of Investments (New Delhi, 26 February 1999)
- 2000 – Agreement between the Government of Australia and the Government of the United Kingdom of Great Britain and Northern Ireland concerning the Investigation, Restraint and Confiscation of the Proceeds and Instruments of Crime
- 2000 – Agreement between the Government of Australia and the Government of New Zealand concerning the Transfer of Uranium
- 2000 – Agreement for Cooperation between the Government of Australia and the Government of the United States of America concerning Technology for the Separation of Isotopes of Uranium by Laser Excitation [SILEX Agreement], Agreed Minute and Exchange of Notes (Washington, 28 October 1999)
- 2000 – Agreement between the Government of Australia and the Government of New Zealand on Child and Spousal Maintenance (Canberra, 12 April 2000)
- 2000 – Agreement between the Government of Australia and the Government of the Federal Republic of Germany on Cultural Cooperation (Dresden, 7 November 1997)
- 2000 – [Second] Protocol to amend the Agreement between Australia and Finland for the Avoidance of Double Taxation and the Prevention of Fiscal Evasion with respect to Taxes on Income, and [First] Protocol, of 12 September 1984
- 2000 – Protocol Amending the Agreement Between the Government of Australia and the Government of Malaysia for the Avoidance of Double Taxation and the Prevention of Fiscal Evasion with respect to Taxes on Income
- 2000 – Agreement on Consular Relations between Australia and the People's Republic of China (Canberra, 8 September 1999)
- 2000 – Exchange of Notes constituting an Agreement between the Government of Australia and the Government of the United States of America to further extend in force the Agreement relating to the Establishment of a Joint Defence Facility at Pine Gap of 9 December 1966, as amended (Canberra, 4 June 1998)
- 2000 – Exchange of Letters constituting an Agreement between the Government of Australia and the Government of the United Kingdom of Great Britain and Northern Ireland to amend [Articles 1–3 of] the Agreement on Health Services of 21 March 1986 (London, 29 May 1998)
- 2000 – Agreement on Social Security between Australia and the Republic of Italy (Rome, 13 September 1993) Exchange of Notes constituting an Agreement between the Government of Australia and the Government of the Republic of Italy amending and clarifying the Agreement on Social Security of 13 September 1993 (Canberra, 31 May 2000)
- 2000 – Treaty on Development Co-operation between the Government of Australia and the Government of Papua New Guinea (Port Moresby, 7 October 1999)
- 2000 – Exchange of Notes constituting an Agreement between the Government of Australia and the Government of Japan to further amend the Exchange of Letters constituting an Agreement establishing an Implementing Arrangement pursuant to the Agreement for Cooperation in the Peaceful Uses of Nuclear Energy of 5 March 1982
- 2000 – Exchange of Notes constituting an Agreement between the Government of Australia and the Government of the United States of America to further amend and extend the Agreement concerning Space Vehicle Tracking and Communication Facilities of 29 May 1980, as amended (Canberra, 4 August 2000)

== 2001–2015 bilateral treaties ==
- 2001 – Agreement between Australia and Romania for the Avoidance of Double Taxation and the Prevention of Fiscal Evasion with respect to Taxes on Income, and Protocol
- 2001 – Agreement between Australia and the Kingdom of Denmark on Social Security (Canberra, 1 July 1999)
- 2001 – Agreement Between the Government of Australia and the Government of the Kingdom of Denmark for the Reciprocal Protection of Classified Information of Defence Interest (Copenhagen, 27 September 1999)
- 2001 – Agreement between the Government of Australia and the Government of the Kingdom of Spain on Remunerated Employment for Dependants of Diplomatic, Consular, Administrative and Technical Personnel of Diplomatic and Consular Missions
- 2001 – Agreement Between the Government of Australia and the Government of the Republic of South AFRICA for the Reciprocal Protection of Classified Information of Defence Interest (Canberra, 11 May 2000)
- 2001 – Exchange of Notes Constituting an Agreement, between Australia and the United States of America to Amend and Extend the Agreement on Cooperation in Defence Logistics Support, done at Sydney on 4 November 1989 (Canberra 30, July 2001)
- 2001 – Films Co-production Agreement Between the Government of Australia and the Government of the Federal Republic of Germany (Canberra, 17 January 2001)
- 2001 – Mutual Recognition Agreement between Australia and the Republic of Singapore on Conformity Assessment (Canberra 26 February 2001)
- 2002 – Agreement between Australia and the Kyrgyz Republic on the Status of Australian Forces in the Kyrgyz Republic (Bishkek, 14 February 2002)
- 2002 – Agreement Between Australia and the Republic of Portugal on Social Security (Lisbon, 3 September 2001)
- 2002 – Agreement Between the Government of Australia and the Government of New Zealand concerning a Joint Food Standards System (Canberra, 10 October 2001)
- 2002 – Agreement between the Government of Australia and the Government of the Arab Republic of Egypt on the Promotion and Protection on Investments (Cairo, 3 May 2001)
- 2002 – Agreement Between the Government of Australia and the Government of the Arab Republic of Egypt regarding Cooperation on Protecting the Welfare of Children (Cairo, 22 October 2000)
- 2002 – Agreement Between the Government of Australia and the Government of the Czech Republic on Cooperation in Peaceful Uses of Nuclear Energy and the Transfer on Nuclear Material (Prague, 27 July 2001)
- 2002 – Agreement between the Government of Australia and the Government of the Kingdom of Thailand on the Transfer of Offenders and Co-operation in the Enforcement of Penal Sentences (Hanoi, 26 July 2001)
- 2002 – Agreement Between the Government of Australia and the Government of the Republic of Lithuania on the Promotion and Protection of Investments (Vilnius, 24 November 1998)
- 2002 – Agreement Between the Government of Australia and the Government of the United States of America concerning Security Measures for the Protection of Classified Information (Canberra, 25 June 2002)
- 2002 – Agreement Between the Government of Australia and the Government of the United States of America for the Enforcement of Maintenance (Support) Obligations (Canberra, 12 December 2002)
- 2002 – Agreement between the Government of Australia and the Government of the United States of America on Social Security (Canberra, 27 September 2001)
- 2002 – Agreement Between the Government of Australia and the Republic of Hungary on Cooperation in Peaceful Uses of Nuclear Energy and the Transfer of Nuclear Material (Budapest, 8 August 2001)
- 2002 – Agreement on Social Security Between the Government of Australia and the Government of New Zealand (Canberra, 28 March 2001)
- 2002 – Exchange of Notes Constituting an Agreement between Australia and the United States of America Concerning Cooperation on the Application of Non Proliferation Assurances on Retransfer to Taiwan (Washington, 31 July 2001)
- 2002 – Exchange of Notes Constituting an Agreement Between the Government of Australia and the Government of the Democratic Republic of East Timor concerning Arrangements for Exploration and Exploitation of Petroleum in an Area of the Timor Sea Between Australia and East Timor (Dili, 20 May 2002)
- 2002 – Protocol Amending the Convention Between Australia and Canada for the Avoidance of Double Taxation and the Prevention of Fiscal Evasion with respect to Taxes on Income (Canberra, 23 January 2002)
- 2002 – Protocol to Agreement between Australia and the Republic of Austria (1 April 1992, Canberra) on Social Security (Vienna, 26 June 2001)
- 2003 – Agreement Between Australia and Spain on Social Security (Madrid, 31 January 2002)
- 2003 – Agreement Between Australia and Uruguay on the Promotion and Protection of Investment (Punta del Este, 3 September 2001)
- 2003 – Agreement Between the Commonwealth of Australia and the Kingdom of the Netherlands on Mutual Administrative Assistance for the Proper Application of Customs Law and for the Prevention, Investigation and Combating of Customs Offences (The Hague, 24 October 2001)
- 2003 – Agreement Between the Government of Australia and the Government of The Kingdom of the Netherlands on Social Security (The Hague, 2 July 2001)
- 2003 – Agreement Between the Government of Australia and the Government of the Russian Federation for the Avoidance of Double Taxation and the Prevention of Fiscal Evasion with respect to Taxes on income, and Protocol (Canberra, 7 September 2000)
- 2003 – Agreement on Social Security Between Australia and the Federal Republic of Germany (Canberra, 13 December 2000)
- 2003 – Agreement on Social Security Between the Government of Australia and the Government of Canada (Ottawa, 26 July 2001)
- 2003 – Convention Between the Government of Australia and the Government of the United Kingdom of Great Britain and Northern Ireland for the Avoidance of Double Taxation and the Prevention of Fiscal Evasion with respect to Taxes on Income and on Capital Gains (Canberra, 21 August 2003)
- 2003 – Exchange of Letters constituting an Agreement to amend the Agreement on Medical Treatment for Temporary Visitors Between Australia and Ireland (Canberra, 30 July 2002)
- 2003 – Exchange of Letters, Constituting an Agreement to Amend the Agreement Between the Government of Australia and the Government of the Socialist Republic of Vietnam for the Avoidance of Double Taxation and the Prevention of Fiscal Evasion with respect to Taxes on Income (Hanoi, 13 April 1992) as Amended by an Exchange of Notes (Canberra, 5 August 2002)
- 2003 – Protocol Amending the Convention Between the Government of Australia and the Government of the United States of America for the Avoidance of Double Taxation and the Prevention of Fiscal Evasion with respect to Taxes on Income of 6 August 1982 (Canberra, 27 September 2001)
- 2003 – Timor Sea Treaty Between the Government of East Timor and the Government of Australia (Dili, 20 May 2002)
- 2004 – Agreement between Australia and Nauru Concerning Additional Police and Other Assistance to Nauru (Melbourne, 10 May 2004)
- 2004 – Agreement between Australia and the Republic of Croatia (Zagreb, 13 May 2003)
- 2004 – Agreement between the Government of Australia and the Government of the Kingdom of Belgium on "Working Holiday" Arrangements (Canberra, 20 November 2002)
- 2004 – Agreement between the Government of Australia and the Government of the Kingdom of Norway on Medical Treatment for Temporary Visitors (Canberra, 28 March 2003)
- 2004 – Agreement between the Government of Australia and the Government of the Republic of France on employment of Dependants of Agents of Official Missions of One of the Two States in the Other State (Adelaide, 2 November 2001)
- 2004 – Agreement between the Government of Australia and the Government of the Republic of Kazakhstan on Economic and Commercial Cooperation (Almaty, 7 May 1997)
- 2004 – Agreement between the Government of Australia and the Government of the Russian Federation on Cooperation in the Field of the Exploration and Use of Outer Space for Peaceful Purposes (Canberra, 23 May 2001)
- 2004 – Agreement between the Government of Australia and the Government of the United Mexican States for the Avoidance of Double Taxation and the Prevention of Fiscal Evasion with Respect to Taxes on Income (Mexico City, 9 September 2002)
- 2004 – Agreement on Social Security between the Government of Australia and the Government of the Republic of Chile (Canberra, 25 March 2003)
- 2004 – Agreement on Social Security between the Government of Australia and the Government of the Republic of Slovenia (Vienna, 19 December 2002)
- 2004 – Consular Agreement between Australia and the Socialist Republic of Vietnam (Hanoi, 29 July 2003)
- 2004 – Exchange of Letters between Australia and Italy Concerning Australian Citizens Wishing to Marry in Italy (Rome, 11 April 2000 )
- 2004 – Joint Agreement on Enhanced Cooperation between Australia and Papua New Guinea (Port Moresby, 30 June 2004)
- 2004 – Second Protocol Amending the Agreement between the Government of Australia and the Government of Malaysia for the Avoidance of Double Taxation and the Prevention of Fiscal Evasion with Respect to Taxes on Income as Amended by the First Protocol of 2 August 1999
- 2005 – Agreement Between Australia and the Argentine Republic Concerning Cooperation in the Peaceful Uses of Nuclear Energy (Canberra, 8 August 2001)
- 2005 – Agreement Between the Government of Australia and the Government of New Zealand concerning the Status of their Forces (Melbourne, 29 October 1998)
- 2005 – Agreement on Bilateral Cooperation Between the Government of Australia and the Government of the Kingdom of Thailand (Canberra, 5 July 2004)
- 2005 – Agreement on Social Security Between Australia and the Kingdom of Belgium (Canberra, 20 November 2002)
- 2005 – Agreement on Social Security Between the Government of Australia and the Government of Ireland (Dublin, 9 June 2005)
- 2005 – Agreement on Social Security Between the Government of Australia and the Government of Malta (Valletta, 16 June 2004)
- 2005 – Treaty Between the Government of Australia and the Government of the French Republic on Cooperation in the Maritime Areas Adjacent to the French Southern and Antarctic Territories (TAAF), Heard Island and the McDonald Islands (Canberra, 24 November 2003)
- 2006 – Agreement Between the Government of Australia and the Government of the Hong Kong Special Administrative Region of the People's Republic of China Concerning Transfer of Sentenced Persons (Hong Kong, 25 November 2005)
- 2006 – Agreement Between the Government of Australia and the Government of the Republic of Singapore Concerning the Use of Shoalwater Bay Training Area and the Use of Associated Facilities In Australia (Perth, 23 August 2005)
- 2006 – Agreement on the Promotion of Aviation Safety with the United States of America (Canberra, 21 June 2005)
- 2006 – Agreement with the Kingdom of Belgium on the gainful employment of certain dependants of diplomatic and consular personnel (Sydney, 19 November 2002)
- 2006 – Exchange of Notes constituting an Agreement between the Government of Australia and the Government of the United States of America to Amend and Extend the Agreement concerning the Conduct of Scientific Balloon Flights for Civil Research Purposes (Canberra, 16 February 2006)
- 2006 – Exchange of Notes constituting an Agreement with the Government of Japan to amend, by replacing the Delinated and Recorded Japanese Nuclear Fuel Cycle Program, the Agreement for Co-operation in the Peaceful Uses of Nuclear Energy of 5 March 1982, as amended (Canberra, 23 November 2006)
- 2006 – Implementation procedures for airworthiness covering design approval, production activities, export airworthiness approval, post design approval activities, and technical assistance between authorities (under the Agreement on the promotion of aviation safety with the United States of America) [the IPA]
- 2006 – Mutual Recognition Agreement on Conformity Assessment In Relation To Medicines Good Manufacturing Practice Inspection and Certification Between the Government of Australia and the Government of Canada (Canberra, 16 March 2005)
- 2006 – Treaty between the Government of Australia and the Government of New Zealand Establishing Certain Exclusive Economic Zone Boundaries and Continental Shelf Boundaries (Adelaide, 25 July 2004)
- 2006 – United Nations Convention Against Corruption (New York, 31 October 2003)
- 2007 – Agreement Between the Government of Australia and the Government of the People's Republic of China for Cooperation in the Peaceful Uses of Nuclear Energy (Canberra, 3 April 2006)
- 2007 – Agreement Between the Government of Australia and the Government of Bermuda [as authorised by] the Government of the United Kingdom of Great Britain and Northern Ireland on the Exchange of Information with respect to Taxes (Washington, 10 November 2005)
- 2007 – Agreement Between the Government of Australia and the Government of Finland for the Avoidance of Double Taxation with respect to Taxes on Income and the Prevention of Fiscal Evasion and Protocol (Melbourne, 20 November 2006)
- 2007 – Agreement Between the Government of Australia and the Government of the Democratic Republic of Timor-Leste relating to the Unitisation of the Sunrise and Troubadour Fields (Dili, 6 March 2003)
- 2007 – Agreement Between the Government of Australia and the Government of the Democratic Socialist Republic of Sri Lanka for the Promotion and Protection of Investments (Canberra, 12 November 2002)
- 2007 – Agreement Between the Government of Australia and the Government of the Kingdom of Norway on Social Security (Canberra, 2 December 2005)
- 2007 – Agreement Between the Government of Australia and the Government of the People's Republic of China on the Transfer of Nuclear Material (Canberra, 3 April 2006)
- 2007 – Agreement Between the Government of Australia and the Government of the Republic of Korea on the Protection of Migratory Birds and Exchange of Notes (Canberra, 6 December 2006)
- 2007 – Agreement Between the Government of Australia and the Government of the United Mexican States on the Promotion and Reciprocal Protection of Investments and Protocol Mexico City 23 August 2005
- 2007 – Agreement Between the Government of Australia and the Government of the United States of America on Cooperation in Science and Technology for Homeland/Domestic Security Matters (Washington, 21 December 2005) (see also Earth stations in Australia)
- 2007 – Agreement on Scientific and Technological Cooperation Between the Government of Australia and the Government of the Republic of South Africa (Canberra, 18 October 2006)
- 2007 – Agreement relating to Scientific and Technical Cooperation Between the Government of Australia and the Government of the United States of America (Canberra, 28 February 2006)
- 2007 – Convention Between Australia and the Kingdom of Norway for the Avoidance of Double Taxation with respect to Taxes on Income and the Prevention of Fiscal Evasion (Canberra, 8 August 2006)
- 2007 – Exchange of Notes constituting an Agreement between the Government of Australia and the Government of Singapore to amend Annex 2C and Annex 2D of the Singapore-Australia Free Trade Agreement (SAFTA) to ensure compliance with changes to the International Convention on the Harmonized Commodity Description and Coding System (HS2007) (Singapore, 8 and 11 October 2007)
- 2007 – Protocol Amending the Agreement Between the Government of Australia and the Government of New Zealand for the Avoidance of Double Taxation and the Prevention of Fiscal Evasion with respect to Taxes on Income (Melbourne, 15 November 2005)
- 2007 – Supplementary Agreement Between The Government Of The Commonwealth Of Australia And The Government Of The United Kingdom Of Great Britain And Northern Ireland Concerning The Anglo-Australian Optical Telescope, At Siding Spring, New South Wales, Australia (Canberra, 3 November 2005)
- 2007 – Treaty Between Australia and the Government of the Democratic Republic of Timor-Leste on Certain Maritime Arrangements in the Timor Sea (Sydney, 12 January 2006)
- 2008 – Agreement Between Australia and the Federal Republic of Germany on Social Security to Govern Persons Temporarily Employed in the Territory of the Other State ("Supplementary Agreement") (Berlin, 9 February 2007)
- 2008 – Agreement Between Australia and the Hellenic Republic on Social Security (Canberra, 23 May 2007)
- 2008 – Agreement Between Australia and the Republic of Indonesia on the Framework for Security Cooperation (Mataram, Lombok, 13 November 2008)
- 2008 – Agreement between Australia and the Swiss Confederacy on Social Security (Canberra, 9 October 2008)
- 2008 – Agreement Between the Government of Australia and the Government of New Zealand in relation to Mutual Recognition of Securities Offerings (Melbourne, 22 February 2006)
- 2008 – Agreement Between the Government of Australia and the Government of the Kingdom of the Netherlands in respect of the Netherlands Antilles for the Exchange of Information with respect to Taxes (Canberra, 1 March 2007)
- 2008 – Agreement Between the Government of Australia and the Government of the Republic of Singapore concerning the Co-production of Films (Sydney, 7 September 2007)
- 2008 – Agreement Between the Government of Australia and the Government of the United Arab Emirates concerning Defence Cooperation (Abu Dhabi, 23 April 2007)
- 2008 – Agreement on Social Security Between the Government of Australia and the Government of the Republic of Korea (Canberra, 6 December 2006)
- 2008 – Convention Between Australia and Japan for the Avoidance of Double Taxation and the Prevention of Fiscal Evasion with respect to Taxes on Income, Protocol, and Exchange of Notes (Tokyo, 31 January 2008)
- 2008 – Film Co-production Agreement Between the Government of Australia and the Government of the People's Republic of China (Beijing, 27 August 2007)

with respect to Taxes on Income of 1999 (Pretoria, 31 March 2008)

- 2008 – Protocol Amending the Agreement Between the Government of Australia and the Government of the Republic of South Africa for the Avoidance of Double Taxation and the Prevention of Fiscal Evasion with Respect to Taxes of Income of 1999
- 2009 – Agreement Between Australia and Japan on Social Security (Canberra, 27 February 2007)
- 2009 – Agreement Between Australia and the Republic of Finland on Social Security (Helsinki, 10 September 2008)
- 2009 – Agreement Between the Government of Australia and the Government of the French Republic regarding Defence Cooperation and Status of Forces (Paris, 14 December 2006)
- 2009 – Agreement Between the Government of Australia and the Government of the Kingdom of Cambodia concerning Transfer of Sentenced Persons (Canberra, 11 October 2006)
- 2009 – Agreement on Employment of the Spouses and Dependants of Diplomatic and Consular Personnel Between Australia and the Portuguese Republic (Lisbon, 6 February 2009)
- 2009 – Agreement on Health Care Insurance Between Australia and the Kingdom of Belgium (Canberra, 10 August 2006)
- 2009 – Agreement to Amend the Agreement between the Government of Australia and the Government of the United States of America concerning Acquisition and Cross-Servicing (Washington, 30 July 2009)
- 2009 – Amendments to the Annex of the Japan-Australia Migratory Bird Agreement (JAMBA) of 6 October 1974 (Shanghai, 25 May 2006)
- 2009 – Amendments to the Exchange of Notes constituting an Agreement between the Government of Australia and the Government of the United States of America concerning Certain Mutual Defense Commitments (Chapeau Defense Agreement) effected by exchange of notes signed at Sydney and Canberra on December 1, 1995 (Canberra, 4 December 2008)
- 2009 – Convention Between the Government of Australia and the Government of the French Republic for the Avoidance of Double Taxation with respect to Taxes on Income and the Prevention of Fiscal Evasion and Protocol (Paris, 20 June 2006)
- 2009 – Framework Agreement Between the Government of the Republic of Turkey and the Government of Australia on Cooperation in Military Fields (Canberra, 13 June 2006)
- 2010 – Acquisition and Cross-servicing Agreement between the Government of Australia and the Government of the United States of America (Canberra, 27 April 2010)
- 2010 – Agreement between Australia and the Republic of Lebanon regarding Cooperation on Protecting the Welfare of Children (Beirut, 18 March 2009)
- 2010 – Agreement between Australia and the Republic of Poland on Social Security (Warsaw, 7 October 2009)
- 2010 – Agreement Between Australia and the Republic of Turkey on the Reciprocal Promotion and Protection of Investments (Canberra, 16 June 2005)
- 2010 – Agreement Between the Government of Australia and the Government of Antigua and Barbuda on the Exchange of Information with respect to Taxes (Saint John's, Antigua, 30 January 2007)
- 2010 – Agreement between the Government of Australia and the Government of Gibraltar on the Exchange of Information with respect to Taxes (London, 25 August 2009)
- 2010 – Agreement Between the Government of Australia and the Government of Jersey for the Exchange of Information with respect to Taxes (London, 10 June 2009)
- 2010 – Agreement between the Government of Australia and the Government of the British Virgin Islands for the Allocation of Taxing Rights with respect to certain Income of Individuals (London, 27 October 2008)
- 2010 – Agreement between the Government of Australia and the Government of the British Virgin Islands for the Exchange of Information relating to Taxes (London, 27 October 2008)
- 2010 – Agreement Between the Government of Australia and the Government of the Isle of Man for the Allocation of Taxing Rights with respect to Certain Income of Individuals and to Establish a Mutual Agreement Procedure in respect of Transfer Pricing Adjustments (London, 29 January 2009)
- 2010 – Agreement Between the Government of Australia and the Government of the Isle of Man on the Exchange of Information with respect to Taxes (London, 29 January 2009)
- 2010 – Agreement between the Government of Australia and the Government of the Republic of Korea on the Protection of Classified Military Information (Singapore, 30 May 2009)
- 2010 – Agreement Between the Government of Australia and the Government of the Republic of Singapore concerning the Use of Shoalwater Bay Training Area and the Use of Associated Facilities in Australia (Singapore, 31 May 2009)
- 2010 – Agreement between the Government of Australia and the Government of the Russian Federation on Cooperation in the Use of Nuclear Energy for Peaceful Purposes (Sydney, 7 September 2007)
- 2010 – Agreement between the Government of Australia and the Government of the United States of America concerning Peaceful Uses of Nuclear Energy (New York, 4 May 2010)
- 2010 – Agreement between the Government of Australia and the States of Guernsey for the Exchange of Information relating to Tax Matters (London, 7 October 2009)
- 2010 – Amendment and Extension of the Agreement Between the Government of Australia and the Government of the United States of America concerning Space Vehicle Tracking and Communications Facilities Effected by Exchange of Notes at Canberra May 29, 1980, as amended (Canberra, 25 February 2010)
- 2010 – Convention Between Australia and New Zealand for the Avoidance of Double Taxation with respect to Taxes on Income and Fringe Benefits and the Prevention of Fiscal Evasion (Paris, 26 June 2009)
- 2010 – Exchange of Letters Amending the Agreement between the Government of Australia and the Government of New Zealand concerning a Joint Food Standards System (Canberra, 3 March 2010)
- 2010 – Exchange of Notes constituting an Agreement between the Government of Australia and the Government of the Kingdom of the Netherlands to amend the Agreement concerning the Provision of Medical Treatment of 5 April 1991 (Canberra, 2 July 2009)
- 2010 – Second Protocol Amending the Agreement between the Government of the Commonwealth of Australia and the Government of the Republic of Singapore for the Avoidance of Double Taxation and the Prevention of Fiscal Evasion with respect to Taxes on Income as Amended by the Protocol of 16 October 1989 (Canberra, 8 September 2009)
- 2011 – Agreement on Cooperative Enforcement of Fisheries Laws between the Government of Australia and the Government of the French Republic in the Maritime Areas Adjacent to the French Southern and Antarctic Territories, Heard Island and the McDonald Islands (Paris, 8 January 2007)
- 2011 – Agreement between Australia and the Czech Republic on Social Security (Canberra, 16 September 2009)
- 2011 – Agreement between Australia and the Republic of South Africa concerning the Co-production of Films (Pretoria, 18 June 2010)
- 2011 – Agreement between the Government of Australia and the Government of Anguilla on the Exchange of Information with respect to Taxes (London, 19 March 2010)
- 2011 – Agreement between the Government of Australia and the Government of Belize on the Exchange of Information with respect to Taxes (Belize City, 31 March 2010)
- 2011 – Agreement between the Government of Australia and the Government of Saint Christopher (Saint Kitts) and Nevis for the Exchange of Information relating to Tax Matters (Basseterre, St Kitts and Nevis, 5 March 2010)
- 2011 – Agreement between the Government of Australia and the Government of Saint Lucia on the Exchange of Information with respect to Taxes (New York, 30 March 2010)
- 2011 – Agreement between the Government of Australia and the Government of Saint Vincent and the Grenadines on the Exchange of Information with respect to Taxes (Kingstown, St Vincent and the Grenadines, 18 March 2010)
- 2011 – Agreement between the Government of Australia and the Government of the Cayman Islands on the Exchange of Information with respect to Taxes (Washington, 30 March 2010)
- 2011 – Agreement between the Government of Australia and the Government of the Commonwealth of The Bahamas on the Exchange of Information with respect to Taxes (Washington, 30 March 2010)
- 2011 – Agreement between the Government of Australia and the Government of the Cook Islands on the Exchange of Information with respect to Taxes (Rarotonga, 27 October 2009)
- 2011 – Agreement between the Government of Australia and the Government of the Former Yugoslav Republic of Macedonia on Social Security (Canberra, 26 October 2009)
- 2011 – Agreement between the Government of Australia and the Government of the Principality of Monaco on the Exchange of Information relating to Tax Matters (Paris, 1 April 2010)
- 2011 – Agreement between the Government of Australia and the Government of the Republic of Mauritius on the Exchange of Information with respect to Taxes (Port Louis, 8 December 2010)
- 2011 – Agreement between the Government of Australia and the Government of the Republic of San Marino for the Exchange of Information relating to Taxes (San Marino, 4 March 2010)
- 2011 – Agreement between the Government of Australia and the Government of the Republic of the Marshall Islands on the Exchange of Information with respect to Taxes (Majuro, 12 May 2010)
- 2011 – Agreement between the Government of Australia and the Government of the Republic of Vanuatu on the Exchange of Information with respect to Taxes (Devonport, 21 April 2010)
- 2011 – Agreement between the Government of Australia and the Government of the Turks and Caicos Islands on the Exchange of Information with respect to Taxes (Washington, 30 March 2010)
- 2011 – Agreement between the Government of Australia and the Government of the United States Of America relating to the Operation of and Access to an Australian Naval Communication Station at North West Cape in Western Australia (Washington, 16 July 2008)
- 2011 – Agreement between the Government of Australia and the Kingdom of the Netherlands in respect of Aruba on the Exchange of Information with respect to Taxes (Canberra, 16 December 2009)
- 2011 – Agreement between the Government of Australia and the Kingdom of the Netherlands, in respect of Aruba, for the Allocation of Taxing Rights with respect to Certain Income of Individuals and to Establish a Mutual Agreement Procedure in respect of Transfer Pricing Adjustments (Canberra, 16 December 2009)
- 2011 – Agreement between the Government of Australia and the States of Guernsey for the Allocation of Taxing Rights with respect to Certain Income of Individuals and to Establish a Mutual Agreement Procedure in respect of Transfer Pricing Adjustments (London, 7 October 2009)
- 2011 – Agreement concerning the Provision of Health Care between the Government of Australia and the Government of the Republic of Slovenia (Canberra, 11 March 2009)
- 2011 – Implementation Procedures for Airworthiness covering Design Approval, Production Activities, Export Airworthiness Approval, Post Design Approval Activities, and Technical Assistance between Authorities under the Agreement on the Promotion of Aviation Safety Between the Government of Australia and the Government of the United States of America (Washington, 7 May 2010)
- 2011 – Third Protocol Amending the Agreement between the Government of Australia and the Government of Malaysia for the Avoidance of Double Taxation and the Prevention of Fiscal Evasion with respect to Taxes on Income as Amended by the First Protocol of 2 August 1999 and the Second Protocol of 28 July 2002
- 2011 – Treaty between Australia and the People's Republic of China concerning Transfer of Sentenced Persons (Sydney, 6 September 2007)
- 2012 – Agreement between Australia and the Republic of Hungary on Social Security (Gödöllő, 7 June 2011)
- 2012 – Agreement between Australia and the Slovak Republic on Social Security (New York, 21 September 2010)
- 2012 – Agreement between the European Union and Australia on the Processing and Transfer of Passenger Name Record (PNR) Data by Air Carriers to the Australian Customs and Border Protection Service (Brussels, 29 September 2011)
- 2012 – Agreement between the Government of Australia and the Government of Grenada for the Exchange of Information relating to Tax Matters (New York, 30 March 2010)
- 2012 – Agreement between the Government of Australia and the Government of Jersey for the Allocation of Taxing Rights with respect to certain Income of Individuals and to establish a Mutual Agreement Procedure in respect of Transfer Pricing Adjustments (London, 10 June 2009)
- 2012 – Agreement between the Government of Australia and the Government of Liberia on the Exchange of Information with respect to Taxes (Monrovia, 11 August 2011)
- 2012 – Agreement between the Government of Australia and the Government of Montserrat (as Authorised by the Government of the United Kingdom of Great Britain and Northern Ireland) on the Exchange of Information with respect to Taxes (London, 23 November 2010)
- 2012 – Agreement between the Government of Australia and the Government of Samoa on the Exchange of Information with respect to Taxes (Canberra, 16 December 2009)
- 2012 – Agreement between the Government of Australia and the Government of the Commonwealth of Dominica on the Exchange of Information with respect to Taxes and Tax Matters (Roseau, 30 March 2010)
- 2012 – Agreement between the Government of Australia and the Government of the Kingdom of Bahrain on the Exchange of Information with Respect to Taxes (Manama, 15 December 2011)
- 2012 – Agreement between the Government of Australia and the Government of the Macao Special Administrative Region of the People's Republic of China for the Exchange of Information relating to Taxes (Macao, 12 July 2011)
- 2012 – Agreement between the Government of Australia and the Government of the Principality of Andorra on the Exchange of Information with respect to Taxes (New York, 24 September 2011)
- 2012 – Agreement between the Government of Australia and the Government of the Principality of Liechtenstein on the Exchange of Information on Taxes (Vaduz, 21 June 2011)
- 2012 – Agreement between the Government of Australia and the Government of the Republic of Singapore concerning the Location of a Republic of Singapore Air Force Helicopter Squadron at the Australian Army Aviation Centre Oakey (Singapore, 1 June 2012)
- 2012 – Agreement between the Government of Australia and the Government of the Republic of the Philippines concerning the Status of Visiting Forces of Each State in the Territory of the Other State (Canberra, 31 May 2007)
- 2012 – Agreement between the Government of Australia and the Kingdom of Spain for the Mutual Protection of Classified Information of Defence Interest (Madrid, 17 November 2011)
- 2013 – Agreement between Australia and the Republic Of Latvia on Social Security (Riga, 7 September 2011)
- 2013 – Agreement Between the Government of Australia and the Government of Costa Rica on the Exchange of Information with Respect to Taxes (Mexico City, 1 July 2011)
- 2013 – Agreement between the Government of Australia and the Government of Japan concerning Reciprocal Provision of Supplies and Services between the Australian Defence Force and the Self-Defense Forces of Japan (Tokyo, 19 May 2010)
- 2013 – Agreement Between the Government of Australia and the Government of Japan on the Security of Information (Tokyo, 17 May 2012)
- 2013 – Agreement between the Government of Australia and the Government of New Zealand on Trans-Tasman Court Proceedings and Regulatory Enforcement (Christchurch 24 July 2008)
- 2013 – Agreement between the Government of Australia and the Government of the Republic of Mauritius for the Allocation of Taxing Rights with respect to Certain Income of Individuals and to Establish a Mutual Agreement Procedure in respect of Transfer Pricing Adjustments (Port Louis, 8 December 2010)
- 2013 – Convention Between Australia and the Republic of Chile for the Avoidance of Double Taxation with Respect to Taxes on Income and Fringe Benefits and the Prevention of Fiscal Evasion (Santiago, 10 March 2010)
- 2013 – Convention between the Government of Australia and the Government of the Republic of Turkey for the Avoidance of Double Taxation with respect to Taxes on Income and the Prevention of Fiscal Evasion (Ankara, 28 April 2010)
- 2013 – Exchange of Notes, done at Canberra on 9 December 2011, constituting an Agreement between the Government of Australia and the Government of the United States of America to amend and extend the Agreement concerning Cooperation in Defense Logistics Support, done at Sydney on 4 November 1989 (Canberra, 9 December 2011)
- 2013 – Protocol Amending the Agreement between the Government of Australia and the Government of the Republic of India for the Avoidance of Double Taxation and the Prevention of Fiscal Evasion with Respect to Taxes on Income (New Delhi, 16 December 2011)
- 2013 – Treaty between the Government of Australia and the Government of The United States of America Concerning Defence Trade Cooperation and Implementing Arrangement (Sydney, 5 September 2007)
- 2014 – Agreement between the Government of Australia and the Government of Japan concerning the Transfer of Defence Equipment and Technology (Canberra, 8 July 2014)
- 2014 – Agreement between the Government of Australia and the Government of the Cook Islands on the Allocation of Taxing Rights with respect to Certain Income of Individuals and to Establish a Mutual Agreement Procedure in respect of Transfer Pricing Adjustments (Rarotonga, 27 October 2009)
- 2014 – Agreement between the Government of Australia and the Government of the United Arab Emirates on Cooperation in the Peaceful Uses of Nuclear Energy (Abu Dhabi, 31 July 2012)
- 2014 – Agreement Between The Government of Australia And the Government of the United States of America For the Sharing of Visa and Immigration Information (Canberra, 27 August 2014)
- 2014 – Agreement between the Government of Australia and the Government of the United States of America to Improve International Tax Compliance and to Implement FATCA (Canberra, 28 April 2014)
- 2014 – Agreement on Scientific and Technological Cooperation between the Government of Australia and the Government of the Socialist Republic of Viet Nam (Canberra, 26 June 2013)
- 2014 – Convention between Australia and the Swiss Confederation for the Avoidance of Double Taxation with respect to Taxes on Income, with Protocol (Sydney, 30 July 2013)
- 2014 – Exchange of Notes, done at Canberra on 21 November 2013, constituting an Agreement between the Government of the United States of America and the Government of Australia to amend the Agreement concerning Space Vehicle Tracking and Communication Facilities of 29 May 1980, as amended (Canberra, 21 November 2013)
- 2014 – Second Protocol Amending the Agreement between Australia and the Kingdom of Belgium for the Avoidance of Double Taxation and the Prevention of Fiscal Evasion with Respect to Taxes on Income Signed at Canberra on 13 October 1977 as Amended by the Protocol Signed at Canberra on 20 March 1984 (Canberra, 24 June 2009)
- 2014 – Treaty between Australia and the Kingdom of the Netherlands on the presence of Australian personnel in the Netherlands for the purpose of responding to the downing of Malaysia Airlines flight MH17 (The Hague, 1 August 2014)
- 2014 – Treaty between the Government of Australia and the Government of the Kingdom of Great Britain and Northern Ireland for Defence and Security Cooperation (Perth, 18 January 2013)
- 2015 – Agreement between Australia and Japan for an Economic Partnership (Canberra, 8 July 2014)
- 2015 – Agreement between the Government of Australia and the Government of India on Cooperation in the Peaceful Uses of Nuclear Energy (New Delhi, 5 September 2014)
- 2015 – Amendments, agreed in Incheon, Republic of Korea on 6 November 2012, to the Annex to the Agreement between the Government of Australia and the Government of Korea for the Protection of Migratory Birds, done at Canberra on 6 December 1986
- 2015 – Amendments, agreed in Incheon, Republic of Korea on 6 November 2012, to the Annex to the Agreement between the Government of Australia and the Government of the People's Republic of China for the Protection of Migratory Birds and their Environment, done at Canberra 20 October 1986
- 2015 – Protocol establishing the Prolongation of the Treaty between Australia and the Kingdom of the Netherlands on the presence of Australian personnel in the Netherlands for the purpose of responding to the downing of Malaysia Airlines Flight MH17
- 2015 – The Force Posture Agreement between the Government of Australia and the Government of the United States of America (Sydney, 12 August 2014)

== 2016-onwards bilateral treaties ==
- 2016 – Agreement Between Australia and the Federal Republic of Germany for the Elimination of Double Taxation with Respect to Taxes on Income and on Capital and the Prevention of Fiscal Evasion and Avoidance (Berlin, 12 November 2015)
- 2016 – Agreement between Australia and the Government of the Republic of India on Social Security (Canberra, 18 November 2014)
- 2016 – Agreement between the Government of Australia and the Government of the Lao People's Democratic Republic Relating to Air Services (Brisbane, 4 July 2015) -
- 2016 – Amendments, agreed in Incheon, Republic of Korea on 6 November 2012, to the Annex to the Agreement between the Government of Australia and the Government of Japan for the Protection of Migratory Birds and Birds in Danger of Extinction and their Environment, done at Tokyo on 6 February 1974 (Incheon, 6 November 2012) -
- 2016 – Second Protocol Establishing the Prolongation of the Treaty between the Kingdom of the Netherlands and Australia on the Presence of Australian Personnel in the Netherlands for the Purpose of Responding to the Downing of Malaysia Airlines Flight MH17 (The Hague, 19 July 2016)
- 2016 – AGREEMENT BETWEEN AUSTRALIA AND THE FEDERAL REPUBLIC OF GERMANY FOR THE ELIMINATION OF DOUBLE TAXATION WITH RESPECT TO TAXES ON INCOME AND ON CAPITAL AND THE PREVENTION OF FISCAL EVASION AND AVOIDANCE (BERLIN, 12 NOVEMBER 2015) -
- 2016 – AGREEMENT BETWEEN THE GOVERNMENT OF AUSTRALIA AND THE GOVERNMENT OF THE REPUBLIC OF INDONESIA RELATING TO AIR SERVICES (CANBERRA, 7 FEBRUARY 2013) -
- 2017 – Treaty on Mutual Legal Assistance in Criminal Matters between Australia and the Socialist Republic of Viet Nam -
- 2017 – Agreement Between the Government of Australia And the Government of the French Republic Regarding the Exchange and Reciprocal Protection of Classified Information -
- 2017 – Framework Agreement Between the Government of Australia And the Government of the French Republic Concerning Cooperation on the Future Submarine Program -
- 2017 – Agreement between the Government of Australia and the Government of Ukraine on Cooperation in the Peaceful uses of Nuclear Energy -
