= Australia–Austria bilateral treaties =

The following is a list of international bilateral treaties between Australia and Austria

- Before 1948, treaties with Austria were extended to Australia by the British Empire, however they are still generally in force.
- Earlier treaties are from the Austria-Hungary Empire
- Later treaties with the European Union (not included)

Entry into force	Topic	Title	Ref
1868	Trade	Treaty of Navigation between the United Kingdom of Great Britain and Ireland and Austria (Vienna, 30 April 1868)	
1873	Extradition	Treaty between the United Kingdom of Great Britain and Ireland and Austria-Hungary for the Mutual Surrender of Fugitive Criminals of 3 December 1873	
1873	Extradition	Declaration amending Article XI of the Treaty between the United Kingdom of Great Britain and Ireland and Austria-Hungary for the Mutual Surrender of Fugitive Criminals of 3 December 1873	
1876	Trade	Treaty of Commerce between the United Kingdom of Great Britain and Ireland and Austria-Hungary, and Protocol (Budapest, 5 December 1876)	
1893	Intellectual Property	Convention between United Kingdom of Great Britain and Ireland and Austria-Hungary for the Establishment of International Copyright (Vienna, 24 April 1893)	
1902	Extradition	Declaration amending Article XI of the Treaty between the United Kingdom of Great Britain and Ireland and Austria-Hungary for the Mutual Surrender of Fugitive Criminals of 3 December 1873	
1905	Arbitration	Convention between the United Kingdom of Great Britain and Ireland and Austria-Hungary providing for the Settlement by Arbitration of Certain Classes of Questions which may arise between the Respective Governments	
1910	Arbitration	Convention between the United Kingdom of Great Britain and Ireland and Austria-Hungary providing for the Settlement by Arbitration of Certain Classes of Questions which may arise between the Two Governments	
1928	Extradition	Exchange of Notes between the Government of the United Kingdom of Great Britain and Northern Ireland (and on behalf of Australia, New Zealand and South Africa) and the Government of the Republic of Austria extending to Certain Mandated Territories the Treaty for the Mutual Surrender of Fugitive Criminals of 3 December 1873, as amended	
1933	Civil law	Convention between the United Kingdom and the Republic of Austria regarding Legal Proceedings in Civil and Commercial Matters	
1935	Extradition	Convention between the United Kingdom and Austria supplementary to the Treaty for the Mutual Surrender of Fugitive Criminals of 3 December 1873	
1948	Other	Exchange of Notes constituting an Agreement between the Government of Australia and the Government of Austria regarding a Gift of Wool to Austria	
1952	Civil law	Exchange of Notes constituting an Agreement between the Government of Australia and the Government of Austria reviving the Convention on Legal Proceedings in Civil and Commercial Matters of 31 March 1931	
1954	Post and Money Orders	Agreement for an Exchange of Postal Parcels between the Commonwealth of Australia and Austria	
1956	Visas	Exchange of Notes constituting an Agreement between the Government of Australia and the Government of the Federal Republic of Austria on Visas and Visa Fees	
1959	Civil law	Exchange of Notes constituting an Agreement between the Government of Australia and the Government of Austria on the Release of Austrian Property held under Australian Statutes and Australian Property subject to Austrian Measures	
1967	Air services	Agreement between the Government of the Commonwealth of Australia and the Austrian Federal Government relating to Air Services	
1967	War/Peace treaty	Exchange of Notes constituting an Agreement between the Government of the Commonwealth of Australia and the Austrian Federal Government on the Status of the Commonwealth War Cemetery at Klagenfurt, Carinthia	
1975	Extradition	Treaty between Australia and the Republic of Austria concerning Extradition	
1987	Extradition	Protocol between Australia and the Republic of Austria amending the Treaty concerning Extradition of 29 March 1973	
1988	Taxation	Agreement between Australia and the Republic of Austria for the Avoidance of Double Taxation and the Prevention of Fiscal Evasion with respect to Taxes on Income	
1990	Criminal law	Treaty between Australia and the Republic of Austria on Mutual Assistance in Criminal Matters	
1992	Social Security	Agreement between Australia and the Republic of Austria on Social Security	
2002	Social Security	Protocol to Agreement between Australia and the Republic of Austria (1 April 1992, Canberra) on Social Security (Vienna, 26 June 2001)	
