= Australia–Bolivia bilateral treaties =

List of treaties between Australia and Bolivia

The following is a list of international bilateral treaties between Australia and Bolivia

- Early treaties were extended to Australia by the British Empire, however they are still generally in force.
- As of 2017, only extradition treaties have been signed between the two countries.

Entry into force	Topic	Title	Ref
1892	Extradition	Treaty between the United Kingdom of Great Britain and Ireland and the Republic of Bolivia for the Mutual Surrender of Fugitive Criminals (Lima, 22 February 1892)	
1928	Extradition	Exchange of Notes between the Government of the United Kingdom of Great Britain and Northern Ireland (and on behalf of Australia, New Zealand and South Africa) and the Government of Bolivia extending to Certain Mandated Territories the Treaty for the Mutual Surrender of Fugitive Criminals of 22 February 1892	
