= Australia–Czech Republic bilateral treaties =

The following is a list of international bilateral treaties between Australia and the Czech Republic

- Early treaties were extended to Australia by the British Empire, however they are still generally in force.
- Treaties of Czechoslovakia are still generally in force.
- European Union treaties, which include the Czech Republic are not listed below.

| Entry into force | Topic | Title | Ref |
|---|---|---|---|
| 1926 | Trade | Exchange of Notes constituting an Agreement between the Government of the United Kingdom of Great Britain and Ireland and the Government of Czechoslovakia relative to the Reduced Rate of Customs Duty to be Levied on Printed Matter in English Advertising Products of British Industry imported into Czechoslovakia | |
| 1927 | Extradition | Treaty between the United Kingdom of Great Britain and Ireland and Czechoslovakia for the Extradition of Criminals | |
| 1927 | Extradition | Protocol amending Article 12 of the Treaty for the Extradition of Criminals between the United Kingdom of Great Britain and Ireland and Czechoslovakia of 11 November 1924 | |
| 1933 | Civil law | Convention between the United Kingdom and the Czechoslovak Republic relative to Legal Proceedings in Civil and Commercial Matters | |
| 1936 | Civil law | Convention between the United Kingdom and the Czechoslovak Republic supplementary to the Convention relative to Legal Proceedings in Civil and Commercial Matters of 11 November 1924 | |
| 1937 | Trade | Treaty of Commerce Between the Commonwealth of Australia and the Czechoslovak Republic | |
| 1948 | Trade | Exchange of Notes constituting an Agreement between the Government of Australia and the Government of Czechoslovakia amending the Treaty of Commerce of 3 August 1936 | |
| 1955 | Post | Agreement for the Exchange of Postal Parcels between the Commonwealth of Australia and the Republic of Czechoslovakia | |
| 1972 | Trade | Agreement on Trade Relations between the Commonwealth of Australia and the Czechoslovak Socialist Republic | |
| 1994 | Civil law | Agreement between Australia and the Czech Republic on the Reciprocal Promotion and Protection of Investments | |
| 1995 | Taxation | Agreement between Australia and the Czech Republic for the Avoidance of Double Taxation and the Prevention of Fiscal Evasion with respect to Taxes on Income | |
| 1997 | Trade | Agreement between the Government of Australia and the Government of the Czech Republic on Trade and Economic Cooperation | |
| 2002 | Nuclear energy | Agreement Between the Government of Australia and the Government of the Czech Republic on Cooperation in Peaceful Uses of Nuclear Energy and the Transfer on Nuclear Material (Prague, 27 July 2001) | |
| 2011 | Social security | Agreement between Australia and the Czech Republic on Social Security (Canberra, 16 September 2009) | |
| 2011 | Trade | Air Services Agreement between the Government of Australia and the Government of the Czech Republic (New York, 24 September 2010) | |
