= Australia–Ecuador bilateral treaties =

The following is a list of international bilateral treaties between Australia and Ecuador

- Early treaties were extended to Australia by the British Empire, however they are still generally in force.

Entry into force	Topic	Title	Ref
1880	Extradition	Treaty between the United Kingdom of Great Britain and Ireland and the Republic of the Equator [Ecuador] for the Mutual Surrender of Fugitive Criminals (Quito, 20 September 1880)	
1892	Intellectual property	Convention between the United Kingdom of Great Britain and Ireland and Ecuador relative to Trade Marks (Quito, 26 August 1892)	
1928	Extradition	Exchange of Notes between the Government of the United Kingdom of Great Britain and Northern Ireland (and on behalf of Australia, New Zealand and South Africa) and the Government of Ecuador extending to Certain Mandated Territories the Treaty for the Mutual Surrender of Fugitive Criminals of 20 September 1880	
1937	Extradition	Supplementary Convention between Australia, New Zealand, South Africa and the United Kingdom, and Ecuador, to the Treaty for the Mutual Surrender of Fugitive Criminals of 20 September 1880	
1997	Criminal law	Treaty between the Government of Australia and the Government of the Republic of Ecuador on Mutual Assistance in Criminal Matters	
1990	Extradition	Treaty on Extradition between the Government of Australia and the Government of the Republic of Ecuador	
