= Australia–France relations =

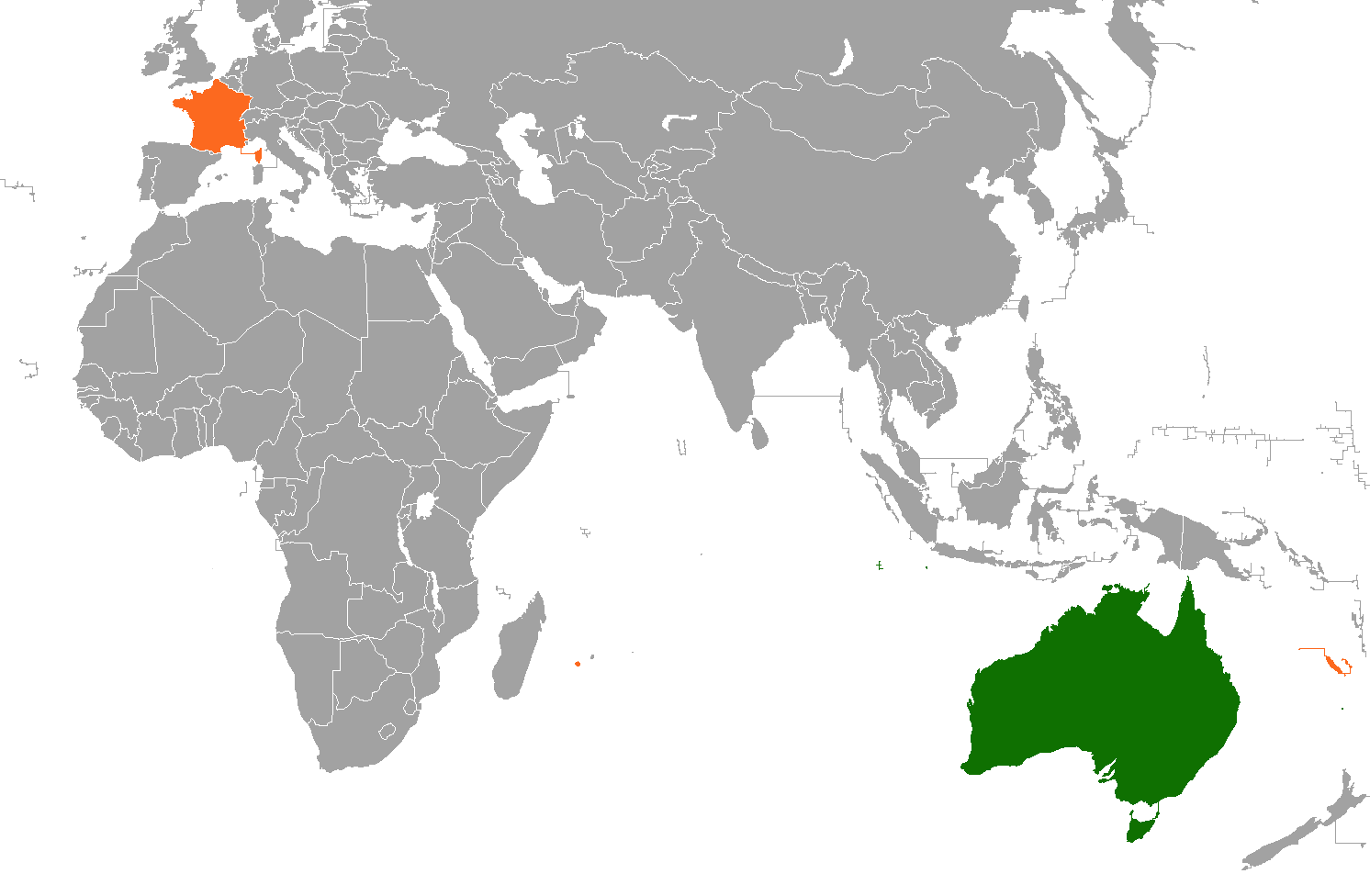

- Australia: France

Diplomatic mission
- Embassy of Australia, Paris: Embassy of France, Canberra

Diplomatic relations exist between Australia and France, as well as the historical contacts, shared values of democracy and human rights, substantial commercial links, and a keen interest in each other's culture.

The two countries maintain diplomatic relations in each other's countries. France is also one of Australia's closest neighbours with less than 700 km separating the two countries between New Caledonia and Norfolk Island.

== History ==
Monthly value of Australian merchandise exports to France (A$ millions) since 1988

Monthly value of French merchandise exports to Australia (A$ millions) since 1988

The legacy of Australian involvement on French soil in the First and Second World War plays an important role in the bilateral relationship. Over 45,000 Australians lost their lives on French soil in the two conflicts. Each year, many Australians travel to the Western Front to commemorate the thousands of Australians who were killed and injured there in World War I.

Dialogue and practical cooperation between France and Australia has been strengthening on many fronts in recent years, including on key global security issues such as arms control and disarmament, non-proliferation and counter-terrorism. The Pacific region, where both countries have direct interests, continues to be an important focus of bilateral engagement. Commercial links are substantial and France is an increasingly important source of direct investment and technology, including in the defence sector, for Australia.

Both countries experienced strained relations when Australia enacted sanctions on France from 1983 to 1986 and again on 1995–1996.

There has been an expansion of the defence relationship between Australia and France in recent years. On 14 December 2006, a new Defence Cooperation Agreement between the two countries was signed, providing a framework for further cooperation. Australia and France regularly participate in combined force training exercises and France provided support to the Australian-led INTERFET operations in East Timor. Australian and French forces have co-operated in the Pacific and Southern Oceans, including for emergency and disaster relief and operations against illegal fishing. Australia and France have also cooperated at various levels in the coalition against terrorism, including as founding members of the Proliferation Security Initiative to combat the trafficking in weapons of mass destruction. In 2008, it was announced that France and Australia would strengthen their defence cooperation further in the Pacific region.

Institutional links are encouraged within the framework of the 1977 Australia–France Agreement on Cultural and Scientific Cooperation. The Australian Embassy in Paris administers the Australia–France Foundation, which promotes cultural exchanges between the two countries and publishes a quarterly newsletter 'L'Australie en France' promoting Australian activities in France. The Department of Foreign Affairs and Trade's Cultural Awards Scheme has also promoted cultural relations between Australia and France.

Australia has made a significant contribution to the Musée du quai Branly, a major international museum dedicated to the world's indigenous arts and cultures that opened in Paris in June 2006. A permanent installation of works by eight Australian Indigenous artists commissioned by the Australian Government has been incorporated into the structure of one of the main buildings of the museum.

Short-term visitors arriving in Australia from France since 1991 (monthly).

Australia and France have maritime borders between their territories. The locations of these boundaries were formalised through the Australia–France Marine Delimitation Agreement which came into effect on 10 January 1983.

In August 2009, Nicolas Sarkozy became the first serving French leader to visit Australia. The Courier Mail reported that "serious bilateral issues" for Sarkozy and Kevin Rudd to discuss included "the war in Afghanistan and global warming".

François Hollande visited Canberra in November 2014 after the G20 Summit in Brisbane. Meeting with Tony Abbott, Hollande reinforced the strong bonds forged between the two nations in both world wars, stating that "we will have an opportunity to recognise the sacrifice of Australian soldiers who came to save France twice, and we will never forget this."

In April 2016, the Australian Government decided to purchase the Attack-class submarine, a conventionally powered variant, of the Barracuda-class nuclear submarine designed by DCNS to replace its Collins-class diesel-electric submarines currently in service. Twelve submarines were to be constructed in Adelaide by ASC Pty Ltd at a projected cost in excess of A$50 billion. Admiral Christophe Prazuck, Chief of the French Navy, stated after the deal was completed that Australia was 'one of the French navy's four main partners along with the US, UK and Germany'. In September 2021, the deal was cancelled with the signing of the AUKUS security pact.

During a 2018 visit to Australia, President Emmanuel Macron stated his desire to create a strategic alliance between France, Australia and India, in the Indo-Pacific region.

In response to Australia joining the AUKUS defence pact with the UK and the US announced on 15 September 2021 (blindsiding France), which also involved the cancellation of the submarine deal with French defence contractor Naval Group, France recalled Ambassador Jean-Pierre Thébault on 17 September 2021. French Foreign Minister Jean-Yves Le Drian stated that "This exceptional decision is justified by the exceptional gravity of the announcements made on 15 September by Australia and the United States". Thébault returned to Australia in October 2021. The submarine deal was worth A$50 billion to build 12 new submarines in Adelaide and was announced in 2016 under then-prime minister Malcolm Turnbull. When asked by the Sydney Morning Herald and The Age whether he thought Australian Prime Minister Scott Morrison had lied over the affair, Macron said: “I don’t think, I know.”

In February 2022, the updated version of France's Indo-Pacific strategy stated France would cooperate with Australia on a case-by-case basis; officially removing it from the list of its strategic partners in the Indo-Pacific region. French foreign minister Jean-Yves Le Drian at the time called the pact a “stab in the back”. “Australia’s decision in September 2021, without prior consultation or warning, to break off the partnership of trust with France that included the Future Submarine Programme (FSP), has led to a re-evaluation of the past strategic partnership [between] the two countries,” the French government explains.

Following the 2022 Australian federal election, the newly elected Labor government led by Australian Prime Minister Anthony Albanese agreed to pay €555 million (US$584 million) in compensation to Naval Group for the cancelled submarine deal. In response, French defense minister Sébastien Lecornu welcomed the settlement and expressed France's willingness to rebuild its relationship with Australia. In addition, Albanese announced plans to travel to France to reset bilateral relations between Australia and France.

On 13 July 2025, French Ambassador Pierre-André Imbert stated that defence relations between France and Australia had recovered following the diplomatic fallout in 2021 over the cancellation of a major submarine contract. He noted that Paris had expressed "strong regrets" after Australia withdrew from a multibillion-dollar agreement to purchase diesel-powered submarines from France.

== French influence on Australia ==
Politically, the relationship between France and Australia has remained strong throughout the 20th and 21st centuries. Public sentiment took a dive, however, in the 1970s during the French nuclear testing in the Pacific on Moruroa.

French is still one of the most commonly taught foreign languages at Australian high schools, though, as an optional course, very few students continue to study it through to completion. Thus, it is rare to find people who are truly fluent in the language. Telopea Park School, an Australian public school, recognised and supported by the French government, is a unique education partnership in Australia.

The Alliance Française French Film Festival is an annual event jointly organised by the Alliance Françaises of Sydney, Melbourne, Brisbane, Canberra, Perth and Adelaide and is supported by the French Embassy.

== Treaties ==
A significant number of Australia–France bilateral treaties include: treaties concerning the war and its aftermath, science, defence, taxation, trade, extradition, and the Antarctic. The April 2016 purchase of submarines from France was also part of a treaty. This purchase was cancelled after Australia, the United States and the United Kingdom entered on 15 September 2021 into the AUKUS security pact, which also involves acquisition by Australia of nuclear powered submarines.

== Multilateral organizations ==
Since 1989, France has been a dialogue partner of the Pacific Islands Forum, which Australia was a founding member of in 1971. France still has various island possessions in the Pacific, including New Caledonia, Clipperton Island, French Polynesia and Wallis and Futuna. Due to its Pacific possessions, France also participates in the South Pacific Defense Ministers’ Meeting (SPDMM), which includes Australia, Chile, Fiji, New Zealand, Papua New Guinea and Tonga.

== Transport links ==
In July 2024, Australia's flag carrier Qantas launched flights from Sydney to Paris via Perth. The Perth to Paris leg is the world's sixth-longest flight and is the only nonstop service between Australia and France.

== Resident diplomatic missions ==
- Australia has an embassy in Paris and has consulates-general in Nouméa, New Caledonia and in Papeete, French Polynesia.
- France has an embassy in Canberra and consulates-general in Melbourne and Sydney.
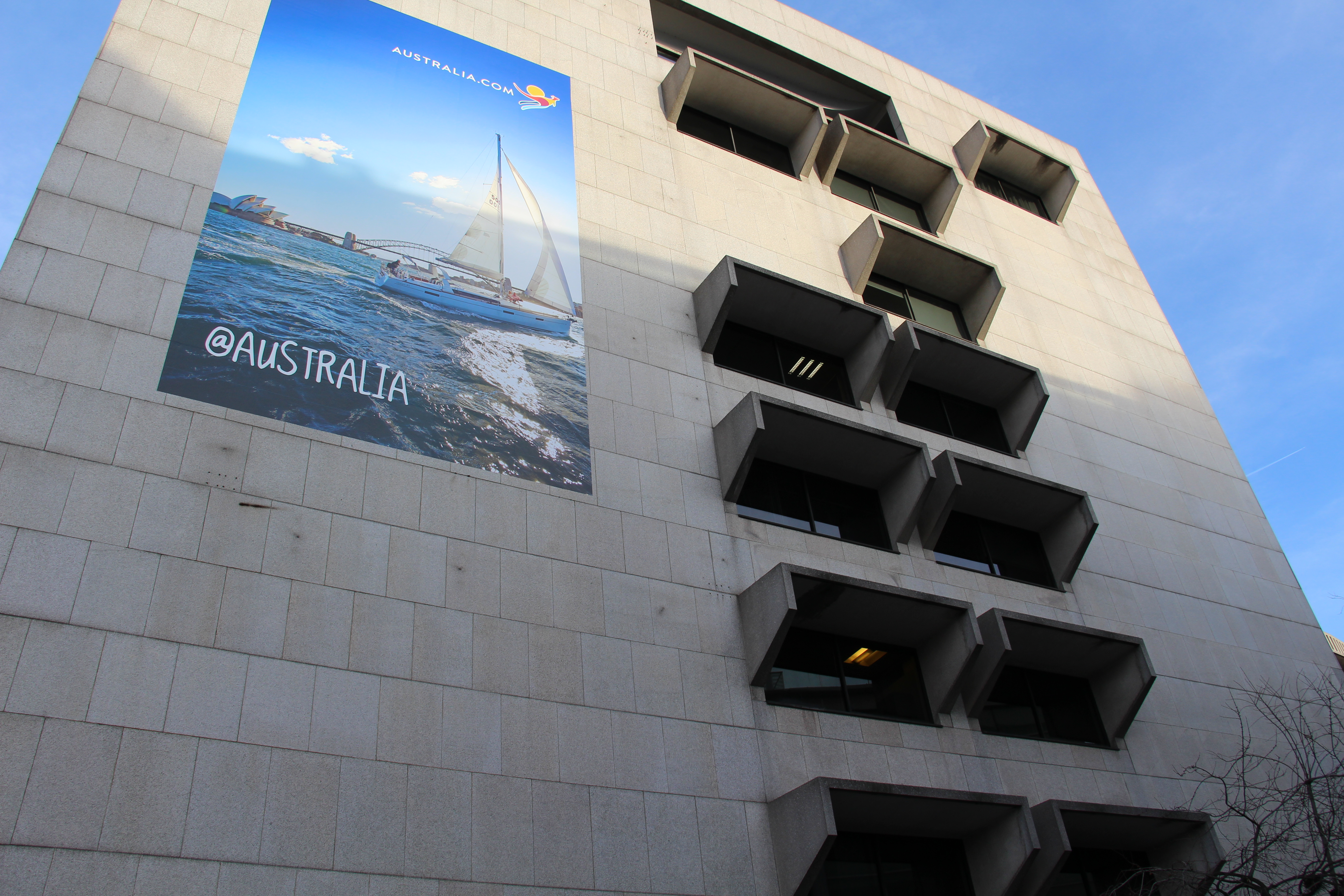
Embassy of Australia in Paris

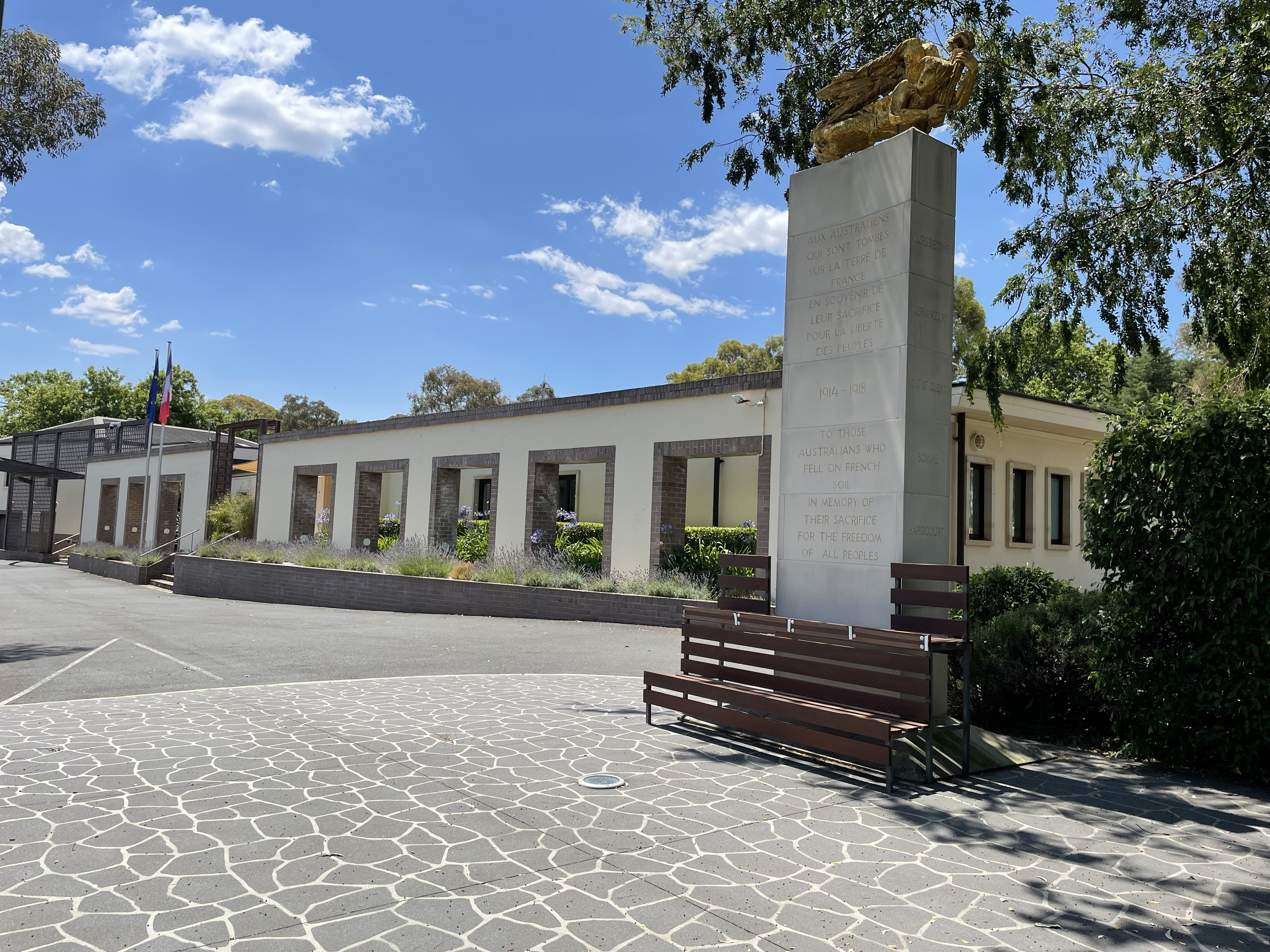
Embassy of France in Canberra

== See also ==
- Foreign relations of Australia
- Foreign relations of France
- Embassy of Australia, Paris
- French Australians
- Wallis and Futuna
- List of ambassadors of Australia to France
- List of ambassadors of France to Australia
