= List of Australian treaties =

This is a list of currently active treaties that the Government of Australia has entered into since the federation of Australia in 1901. The Australian Department of Foreign Affairs and Trade, in conjunction with the Australasian Legal Information Institute, has published an online Australian Treaties Database from where this list is obtained and updated.

== Treaties with Indigenous peoples of Australia ==
No substantial treaty has been entered into between the Australian Government and the Indigenous people of Australia. Some prior treaties exist in pockets, such as Batman's Treaty, but these are not substantial government treaties, i.e. treaties between the Government of the day and the traditional custodians of the land.

In 2025, Victoria became the first Australian state or territory to pass a formal Indigenous treaty. As of 2025, Victoria is the only state or territory to have passed a treaty with its Indigenous peoples.

== International bilateral treaties ==
=== Bilateral treaties on extradition and criminal matters ===
- List of Australian bilateral treaties on extradition and criminal matters

=== Bilateral treaties on postal services and money orders ===
- List of Australian bilateral treaties on postal services and money orders

=== Bilateral treaties on commerce, trade and arbitration ===
- List of Australian bilateral treaties on commerce, trade and arbitration

=== Bilateral treaties on intellectual property ===
- List of Australian bilateral treaties on intellectual property

=== Bilateral treaties by country ===
Country	Bilateral treaty link
Albania	Albania–Australia bilateral treaties
Argentina	Argentina–Australia bilateral treaties
Austria	Australia–Austria bilateral treaties
Belgium	Australia–Belgium bilateral treaties
Bolivia	Australia–Bolivia bilateral treaties
Brazil	Australia–Brazil bilateral treaties
Canada	Australia–Canada bilateral treaties
Chile	Australia–Chile bilateral treaties
Colombia	Australia–Colombia bilateral treaties
Cuba	Australia–Cuba bilateral treaties
Czech Republic	Australia–Czech Republic bilateral treaties
Denmark	Australia–Denmark bilateral treaties
Ecuador	Australia–Ecuador bilateral treaties
El Salvador	Australia–El Salvador bilateral treaties
Estonia	Australia–Estonia bilateral treaties
Finland	Australia–Finland bilateral treaties
France	Australia–France bilateral treaties
Germany	Australia–Germany bilateral treaties
Greece	Australia–Greece bilateral treaties
Guatemala	Australia–Guatemala bilateral treaties
New Zealand	Australia–New Zealand bilateral treaties

== Multilateral treaties ==
- List of Australian multilateral treaties (before 1975)
- List of Australian multilateral treaties (1975–present)
