= List of ambassadors of France to Australia =

Ambassador of France to Australia
- Incumbent; David Martinon since September 2026
- Style: His Excellency
- Appointer: Emmanuel Macron
- Inaugural holder: Pierre Augé
- Formation: 1944

The ambassador of France to Australia is an officer of the French Ministry of Foreign Affairs and International Development and the head of the Embassy of the French Republic to the Commonwealth of Australia. The position has the rank and status of an ambassador extraordinary and plenipotentiary and holds non-resident accreditation for Fiji and Papua New Guinea. The ambassador is based with the embassy in Perth Avenue, Yarralumla in Canberra.

The ambassador is currently David Martinon, and France and Australia have enjoyed diplomatic relations since 1944, although consular representation has existed in Australia and its previous colonies. In 1836, King Louis-Philippe created the first Australian Consulate in Sydney. Opened in 1842, the Sydney consulate was followed by one in Melbourne in 1854. During the Second World War, there existed two French delegations to Australia: one on behalf of the Vichy government, the other for the Free French. These delegations combined in July 1944 following Australia's formal recognition of the Free French forces as the legitimate government of France and Pierre Augé was appointed Minister by the provisional government of Charles de Gaulle in December 1944.

== Ambassadors, 1945–present ==
| Incumbent | Start of term | End of term |
|---|---|---|
| Pierre Augé | 10 March 1945 | 1949 |
| Gabriel Padovani | 1949 | 1952 |
| Louis Roché | 1952 | 1955 |
| Renaud Sivan | 1955 | 1960 |
| Philippe Monod | 1960 | 1963 |
| François Brière | 1963 | 1967 |
| André Favereau | 1967 | 1971 |
| Gabriel Van Laethem | 1971 | 1975 |
| Albert Tréca | 1975 | 1978 |
| Pierre Carraud | 1978 | 1981 |
| Jean-Bernard Mérimée | February 1982 | May 1985 |
| Bernard Follin | 1985 | 1988 |
| Roger Duzer | 1988 | 1991 |
| Philippe Baude | 1991 | 1995 |
| Dominique Girard | 1995 | 2000 |
| Pierre Viaux | 2000 | 2003 |
| Patrick Hénault | 2003 | 2005 |
| François Descoueyte | 2005 | 2008 |
| Michel Filhol | 2008 | 2011 |
| Stéphane Romatet | 2011 | 2014 |
| Christophe Lecourtier | 27 June 2014 | June 2017 |
| Christophe Penot | 27 June 2017 | November 2020 |
| Jean-Pierre Thébault | 27 November 2020 | 2023 |
| Pierre-André Imbert | 2023 | 2026 |
| David Martinon | 2026 | |

== See also ==
- Australia–France relations
- Foreign relations of France
- List of ambassadors of Australia to France
