= List of Australian bilateral treaties on commerce, trade and arbitration =

Australian bilateral treaties on commerce, trade and arbitration are Australian treaties concerning trade, commercial matters, arbitration – they also include shipping and air service related treaties.

== List ==
- 1654 – Treaty of Peace and Commerce between Great Britain and Sweden (Uppsala, 11 April 1654)
- 1656 – Treaty of Commerce between Great Britain and Sweden (Westminster, 17 July 1656)
- 1661 – Treaty of Peace and Commerce between Great Britain and Denmark (Whitehall, 13 February 1661)
- 1661 – Treaty of Peace and Commerce between Great Britain and Sweden (Whitehall, 21 October 1661)
- 1670 – Treaty of Peace and Commerce between Great Britain and Denmark (Copenhagen, 11 July 1670)
- 1766 – Treaty of Commerce and Alliance between Great Britain and Sweden (Stockholm, 5 February 1766)
- 1815 – Convention of Commerce between the United Kingdom of Great Britain and Ireland and the United States of America, and Declaration by United Kingdom regarding St Helena (London, 3 July 1815)
- 1825 – Treaty of Amity, Commerce and Navigation between the United Kingdom of Great Britain and Ireland and Colombia, and Additional Article (Bogota, 18 April 1825)
- 1825 – Treaty of Amity, Commerce and Navigation between the United Kingdom of Great Britain and Ireland and the United Provinces of Rio de la Plata [Argentina] (Buenos Aires, 2 February 1825)
- 1826 – Convention of Commerce and Navigation between the United Kingdom of Great Britain and Ireland and France (London, 26 January 1826)
- 1826 – Convention of Commerce and Navigation between the United Kingdom of Great Britain and Ireland, and Sweden and Norway, and Additional Article (London, 18 March 1826)
- 1834 – Convention between the United Kingdom of Great Britain and Ireland and Venezuela regarding Commerce and Navigation (London, 29 October 1834)
- 1848 – Treaty of Friendship and Commerce between the United Kingdom of Great Britain and Ireland and Liberia (London, 21 November 1848)
- 1849 – Treaty of Friendship, Commerce and Navigation between the United Kingdom of Great Britain and Ireland and Costa Rica (San Jos‚, 27 November 1849)
- 1850 – Treaty of Friendship, Commerce and Navigation between the United Kingdom of Great Britain and Ireland and Peru (London, 10 April 1850)
- 1855 – Treaty of Friendship, Commerce and Reciprocal Establishment between the United Kingdom of Great Britain and Ireland and Switzerland (Berne, 6 September 1855)
- 1856 – Convention of Commerce and Navigation between the United Kingdom of Great Britain and Ireland and Morocco (Tangier, 9 December 1856)
- 1856 – General Treaty between the United Kingdom of Great Britain and Ireland and Morocco (Tangier, 9 December 1856)
- 1857 – Treaty of Peace between the United Kingdom of Great Britain and Ireland and Persia [Iran], and Note (Paris, 4 March 1857)
- 1859 – Treaty of Commerce and Navigation between the United Kingdom of Great Britain and Ireland and Russia, and Separate Articles (St Petersburg, 12 January 1859)
- 1862 – Agreement between the United Kingdom of Great Britain and Ireland and France relative to Joint Stock Companies (Paris, 30 April 1862)
- 1862 – Convention between the United Kingdom of Great Britain and Ireland and Belgium relative to Joint Stock Companies (London, 13 November 1862)
- 1862 – Treaty of Friendship, Commerce and Navigation between the United Kingdom of Great Britain and Ireland and El Salvador (Guatemala, 24 October 1862) (London, 23 January-26 February-10-21 April 1863)
- 1862 – Agreement between the United Kingdom of Great Britain and Ireland and El Salvador prolonging the Treaty of Friendship, Commerce and Navigation of 24 October 1862 (San Salvador, 23 June 1886)
- 1863 – Exchange of Notes between the Government of the United Kingdom of Great Britain and Ireland and the Government of Peru terminating Articles III-VI of the Treaty of Friendship, Commerce and Navigation of 10 April 1850
- 1866 – Treaty of Friendship, Commerce and Navigation between the United Kingdom of Great Britain and Ireland and Colombia (London, 16 February 1866)
- 1867 – Declaration between the Government of the United Kingdom of Great Britain and Ireland and the Government of Italy relating to Joint Stock Companies (Florence, 26 November 1867)
- 1868 – Treaty of Navigation between the United Kingdom of Great Britain and Ireland and Austria (Vienna, 30 April 1868)
- 1874 – Declaration between the Government of the United Kingdom of Great Britain and Ireland and the Government of Germany relative to Joint Stock Companies (London, 27 March 1874)
- 1876 – Treaty of Commerce between the United Kingdom of Great Britain and Ireland and Austria-Hungary, and Protocol (Budapest, 5 December 1876)
- 1883 – Declaration between the Government of the United Kingdom of Great Britain and Ireland and the Government of Spain relative to Joint Stock Companies (Madrid, 29 January 1883)
- 1883 – Treaty of Commerce and Navigation between the United Kingdom of Great Britain and Ireland and Italy, and Protocol (Rome, 15 June 1883)
- 1884 – Treaty of Friendship, Commerce and Navigation between the United Kingdom of Great Britain and Ireland and Paraguay, and Protocol (Assumption, 16 October 1884)
- 1885 – Treaty of Friendship, Commerce and Navigation between the United Kingdom of Great Britain and Ireland and Uruguay (Montevideo, 13 November 1885)
- 1886 – Declaration between the Government of the United Kingdom of Great Britain and Ireland and the Government of Germany relating to Reciprocal Freedom of Trade and Commerce in the British and German Possessions and Protectorates in the Western Pacific (Berlin, 10 April 1886)
- 1886 – Treaty of Commerce and Navigation between the United Kingdom of Great Britain and Ireland and Greece, and Protocol (Athens, 10 November 1886)
- 1887 – Treaty of Friendship, Commerce and Navigation between the United Kingdom of Great Britain and Ireland and Honduras, and Protocol (Guatemala, 21 January 1887)
- 1888 – Agreement between the United Kingdom of Great Britain and Ireland and Greece for Regulating the Position of Joint Stock Companies (Athens, 4 August 1888)
- 1888 – Treaty of Commerce and Navigation between the United Kingdom of Great Britain and Ireland and Mexico (Mexico, 27 November 1888)
- 1889 – Commercial Convention between the United Kingdom of Great Britain and Ireland and Egypt (Cairo, 29 October 1889)
- 1890 – International Convention for the Publication of Customs Tariffs, Regulations for carrying the Convention into effect, and ProcŠs-Verbal relating to the Signature of the Convention and Regulations (Brussels, 5 July 1890)
- 1891 – Treaty of Friendship, Commerce and Navigation between the United Kingdom of Great Britain and Ireland and Muscat [Oman] (Muscat, 19 March 1891)
- 1892 – Commercial Convention between the United Kingdom of Great Britain and Ireland and Roumania (Bucharest, 13 August 1892)
- 1893 – Treaty of Commerce between the United Kingdom of Great Britain and Ireland and Serbia [Yugoslavia] (Belgrade, 10 July 1893)
- 1894 – Treaty of Commerce and Navigation between the United Kingdom of Great Britain and Ireland and Japan, Protocol, and Exchange of Notes (London, 16 July 1894)
- 1894 – Exchange of Notes between the United Kingdom of Great Britain and Ireland and Spain establishing a Commercial Modus Vivendi (Madrid, 20–29 June-28-29 December 1894)
- 1897 – Commercial Agreement between the United Kingdom of Great Britain and Ireland and Bulgaria, and Declaration (Vienna, 24 July 1897)
- 1898 – Exchange of Notes establishing a provisional Modus Vivendi pending the conclusion of a Treaty of Commerce and Navigation between the United Kingdom of Great Britain and Ireland and Belgium (Brussels, 27 July 1898)
- 1899 – Convention between the United Kingdom of Great Britain and Ireland and Uruguay renewing the Treaty of Friendship, Commerce and Navigation of 13 November 1885 (Montevideo, 15 July 1899)
- 1903 – Commercial Convention between Great Britain and Persia [Iran], and Exchange of Notes
- 1903 – Agreement between the United Kingdom of Great Britain and Ireland and France providing for the Settlement by Arbitration of Certain Classes of Questions which may arise between the Two Governments
- 1904 – Agreement between the United Kingdom of Great Britain and Ireland and Germany providing for the Settlement by Arbitration of Certain Classes of Questions which may arise between the Two Governments
- 1904 – Agreement between the United Kingdom of Great Britain and Ireland and Italy providing for the Settlement by Arbitration of Certain Classes of Questions which may arise between the Two Governments
- 1904 – Convention between the United Kingdom of Great Britain and Ireland, and Sweden and Norway, providing for the Settlement by Arbitration of Certain Classes of Questions which may arise between the Respective Governments
- 1904 – Agreement between the United Kingdom of Great Britain and Ireland and Portugal providing for the Settlement by Arbitration of Certain Classes of Questions which may arise between the Two Governments
- 1904 – Agreement between the United Kingdom of Great Britain and Ireland and Spain providing for the Settlement by Arbitration of Certain Classes of Questions which may arise between the Two Governments
- 1904 – Agreement between the United Kingdom of Great Britain and Ireland and Switzerland providing for the Settlement by Arbitration of Certain Classes of Questions which may arise between the Two Governments
- 1905 – Convention between the United Kingdom of Great Britain and Ireland and Austria-Hungary providing for the Settlement by Arbitration of Certain Classes of Questions which may arise between the Respective Governments
- 1905 – Convention between the United Kingdom of Great Britain and Ireland and the Netherlands providing for the Settlement by Arbitration of Certain Classes of Questions which may arise between the Two Governments
- 1906 – Convention between the United Kingdom of Great Britain and Ireland and Denmark providing for the Settlement by Arbitration of Certain Classes of Questions which may arise between the Two Governments
- 1907 – Exchange of Notes between the Government of the United Kingdom of Great Britain and Ireland and the Government of Sweden relative to the Agreement for the Mutual Relief of Distressed Seamen of 12 July 1881 (Stockholm, 28 November-12 December 1907)
- 1908 – Agreement between the United Kingdom of Great Britain and Ireland and Colombia providing for the Settlement by Arbitration of Certain Classes of Questions which may arise between the Two Governments
- 1908 – Exchange of Notes between the United Kingdom of Great Britain and Ireland and France renewing for a Further Period of Five Years the Agreement providing for the Settlement by Arbitration of Certain Classes of Questions
- 1908 – Agreement between the United Kingdom of Great Britain and Ireland and Liberia modifying the Treaty of Commerce of 21 November 1848
- 1908 – Arbitration Convention between the United Kingdom of Great Britain and Ireland and the United States of America, and Exchange of Notes
- 1908 – Exchange of Notes between the Government of the United Kingdom of Great Britain and Ireland and the Government of Norway relative to the Agreement for the Mutual Relief of Distressed Seamen of 12 July 1881 (Christiania, 28 November 1907-8 April-4 May 1908)
- 1908 – Declaration between the United Kingdom of Great Britain and Ireland and Paraguay amending the Treaty of Friendship, Commerce and Navigation of 16 October 1884 (Asuncion, 14 March 1908)
- 1909 – Exchange of Notes between the United Kingdom of Great Britain and Ireland and Ethiopia with regard to Import Duties in Ethiopia
- 1909 – Exchange of Notes between the United Kingdom of Great Britain and Ireland and Germany extending for a Further Period of One Year the Agreement providing for the Settlement by Arbitration of Certain Classes of Questions
- 1909 – Exchange of Notes between the United Kingdom of Great Britain and Ireland and Italy renewing for a Further Period of Five Years the Agreement providing for the Settlement by Arbitration of Certain Classes of Questions
- 1909 – Convention between the United Kingdom of Great Britain and Ireland and Norway renewing for a Further Period of Five Years the Convention providing for the Settlement by Arbitration of Certain Classes of Questions which may arise between the Respective Governments of 11 August 1904
- 1909 – Exchange of Notes between the Government of the United Kingdom of Great Britain and Ireland and the Government of Portugal renewing for a Further Period of Five Years the Agreement providing for the Settlement by Arbitration of Certain Classes of Questions which may arise between the Two Governments of 16 November 1904
- 1909 – Exchange of Notes between the Government of the United Kingdom of Great Britain and Ireland and the Government of Spain renewing for a Further Period of Five Years the Agreement providing for the Settlement by Arbitration of Certain Classes of Questions which may arise between the Two Governments of 27 February 1904
- 1909 – Convention between the United Kingdom of Great Britain and Ireland and Sweden renewing for a Further Period of Five Years the Convention providing for the Settlement by Arbitration of Certain Classes of Questions which may arise between the Respective Governments of 11 August 1904
- 1909 – Exchange of Notes between the Government of the United Kingdom of Great Britain and Ireland and the Federal Council of the Swiss Confederation renewing for a Further Period of Five Years the Agreement providing for the Settlement by Arbitration of Certain Classes of Questions which may arise between the Two Governments of 16 November 1904
- 1910 – Convention between the United Kingdom of Great Britain and Ireland and Austria-Hungary providing for the Settlement by Arbitration of Certain Classes of Questions which may arise between the Two Governments
- 1910 – Exchange of Notes between the United Kingdom of Great Britain and Ireland and Germany extending for a Further Period of Four Years the Agreement providing for the Settlement by Arbitration of Certain Classes of Questions which may arise between the Two Governments
- 1910 – Convention between the United Kingdom of Great Britain and Ireland and the Netherlands renewing for a Further Period of Five Years the Convention providing for the Settlement by Arbitration of Certain Classes of Questions which may arise between the Two Governments
- 1911 – Arbitration Convention between the United Kingdom of Great Britain and Ireland and Brazil
- 1911 – Convention between the United Kingdom of Great Britain and Ireland and Denmark renewing for a Further Period of Five Years the Convention providing for the Settlement by Arbitration of Certain Classes of Questions which may arise between the Two Governments of 25 October 1905
- 1911 – Declaration between the Government of the United Kingdom of Great Britain and Ireland and the Government of Sweden relating to the Amendment of Treaties of Commerce of 11 April 1654, 17 July 1656, 21 October 1661, 5 February 1766 and 18 March 1826
- 1912 – Declaration between the United Kingdom of Great Britain and Ireland and the Kingdom of Denmark respecting the Application of existing Treaties of Commerce [of 13 February 1661 and 11 July 1670] to certain parts of the British Dominions
- 1912 – Protocol between the United Kingdom of Great Britain and Ireland and Colombia respecting the Application to certain parts of the British Dominions of the Treaty of Friendship, Commerce and Navigation of 16 February 1866
- 1912 – Protocol between the United Kingdom of Great Britain and Ireland and France respecting the Application to certain parts of the British Dominions of the Additional Articles of the Convention of Commerce and Navigation of 26 January 1826
- 1913 – Protocol between the United Kingdom of Great Britain and Ireland and Costa Rica respecting the Application to certain British Dominions of the Treaty of Friendship, Commerce and Navigation of 27 November 1849 which may arise between the Two Governments of 14 October 1903
- 1913 – Exchange of Notes between the United Kingdom of Great Britain and Ireland and France renewing for a Further Period of Five Years the Agreement providing for the Settlement by Arbitration of Certain Classes of Questions
- 1913 – Convention between the United Kingdom of Great Britain and Ireland and Norway respecting the Application of the Convention on Commerce and Navigation of 18 March 1826 to parts of the British Dominions
- 1914 – Exchange of Notes constituting an Agreement between the United Kingdom of Great Britain and Ireland and Italy renewing for a Further Period of Five Years the Agreement providing for the Settlement by Arbitration of Certain Questions which may arise between the Two Governments
- 1914 – Convention between the United Kingdom of Great Britain and Ireland and Norway renewing for a Further Period of Five Years the Convention providing for the Settlement by Arbitration of Certain Classes of Questions which may arise between the Respective Governments of 11 August 1904
- 1914 – Agreement between the United Kingdom of Great Britain and Ireland and Portugal providing for the Settlement by Arbitration of Certain Classes of Questions which may arise between the Two Governments
- 1914 – Exchange of Notes between the United Kingdom of Great Britain and Ireland and Spain renewing for a Further Period of Five Years the Agreement providing for the Settlement by Arbitration of Certain Classes of Questions which may arise between the Two Governments of 27 February 1904
- 1914 – Convention between the United Kingdom of Great Britain and Ireland and Sweden renewing for a Further Period of Five Years the Convention providing for the Settlement by Arbitration of Certain Classes of Questions which may arise between the Respective Governments of 11 August 1904
- 1914 – Exchange of Notes between the United Kingdom of Great Britain and Ireland and Switzerland prolonging the Operation of the Agreement providing for the Settlement by Arbitration of Certain Classes of Questions which may arise between the Two Governments of 16 November 1904, as extended
- 1914 – Agreement between the United Kingdom of Great Britain and Ireland and the United States of America renewing for a Further Period of Five Years the Arbitration Convention of 4 April 1908
- 1914 – Agreement prolonging for a Period of Five Years the Duration of the Treaty of Friendship, Commerce and Navigation [between Great Britain and Muscat (Oman)] of 18 March 1891
- 1915 – Convention between the Government of the United Kingdom of Great Britain and Ireland and the Federal Council of the Swiss Confederation additional to the Treaty of Friendship, Commerce and Reciprocal Establishment of 6 September 1865
- 1915 – Convention between the United Kingdom of Great Britain and Ireland and Switzerland providing for the Settlement by Arbitration of Certain Classes of Questions which may arise between the Two Governments
- 1915 – Convention between the United Kingdom of Great Britain and Ireland and the Netherlands renewing for a Further Period of Five Years the Convention providing for the Settlement by Arbitration of Certain Classes of Questions which may arise between the Two Governments of 15 February 1905
- 1916 – Convention between the United Kingdom of Great Britain and Ireland and Denmark renewing for a Further Period of Five Years the Convention providing for the Settlement by Arbitration of Certain Classes of Questions which may arise between the Two Governments of 25 October 1905
- 1918 – Agreement between the United Kingdom of Great Britain and Ireland and the United States of America further renewing the Arbitration Convention of 4 April 1908
- 1918 – Exchange of Notes between the United Kingdom of Great Britain and Ireland and France renewing for a Further Period of Five Years the Agreement providing for the Settlement by Arbitration of Certain Classes of Questions which may arise between the Two Governments of 14 October 1903
- 1919 – Exchange of Notes between the United Kingdom of Great Britain and Ireland and Italy renewing for a Further Period of Five Years the Agreement providing for the Settlement by Arbitration of Certain Classes of Questions which may arise between the Two Governments of 1 February 1904
- 1919 – Agreement between the United Kingdom of Great Britain and Ireland and Norway renewing for a Further Period of Five Years the Convention providing for the Settlement by Arbitration of Certain Classes of Questions which may arise between the Respective Governments of 11 August 1904
- 1919 – Exchange of Notes between the United Kingdom of Great Britain and Ireland and Portugal renewing for a Further Period of Five Years the Agreement providing for the Settlement by Arbitration of Certain Classes of Questions which may arise between the Two Governments of 16 November 1914
- 1919 – Exchange of Notes between the United Kingdom of Great Britain and Ireland and Spain renewing for a Further Period of Five Years the Agreement providing for the Settlement by Arbitration of Certain Classes of Questions which may arise between the Two Governments of 27 February 1904
- 1919 – Agreement between the United Kingdom of Great Britain and Ireland and Sweden renewing for a Further Period of Five Years the Convention providing for the Settlement by Arbitration of Certain Classes of Questions which may arise between the Respective Governments of 11 August 1904
- 1919 – Agreement prolonging for One Year the Treaty of Friendship, Commerce and Navigation [between Great Britain and Muscat (Oman)] of 19 March 1891
- 1919 – General Obligatory Arbitration Treaty between the United Kingdom of Great Britain and Ireland and the Oriental Republic of the Uruguay
- 1920 – Agreement further prolonging for One Year the Treaty of Friendship, Commerce and Navigation [between Great Britain and Muscat (Oman)] of 19 March 1891
- 1920 – Convention between the United Kingdom of Great Britain and Ireland and the Netherlands renewing for a Further Period of Five Years the Convention providing for the Settlement by Arbitration of Certain Classes of Questions which may arise between the Two Governments of 15 February 1905
- 1920 – Exchange of Notes constituting an Agreement between the Government of the United Kingdom of Great Britain and Ireland and the Imperial Persian Government modifying the Commercial Convention of 9 February 1903
- 1921 – Agreement further prolonging for One Year the Treaty of Friendship, Commerce and Navigation [between Great Britain and Muscat (Oman)] of 19 March 1891
- 1922 – Convention between the United Kingdom of Great Britain and Ireland and Denmark renewing for a Further Period of Five Years the Convention providing for the Settlement by Arbitration of Certain Classes of Questions which may arise between the Two Governments of 25 October 1905
- 1922 – Convention between the United Kingdom of Great Britain and Ireland and Iceland renewing for a Further Period of Five Years the Convention providing for the Settlement by Arbitration of Certain Classes of Questions which may arise between the Two Governments of 25 October 1905
- 1922 – Trade Agreement between Australia and New Zealand
- 1922 – Agreement further prolonging for One Year the Treaty of Friendship, Commerce and Navigation [between Great Britain and Muscat (Oman)] of 19 March 1891
- 1923 – Exchange of Notes between the Government of the United Kingdom of Great Britain and Ireland and the Government of France renewing for a Further Period of Five Years the Agreement providing for the Settlement by Arbitration of Certain Classes of Questions which may arise between the Two Governments
- 1923 – Agreement between the United Kingdom of Great Britain and Ireland and the United States of America for the Renewal of the Arbitration Convention of 4 April 1908, and Exchange of Notes
- 1923 – Agreement further prolonging for One Year the Treaty of Friendship, Commerce and Navigation [between Great Britain and Muscat (Oman)] of 19 March 1891
- 1924 – Exchange of Notes between the Government of the United Kingdom of Great Britain and Ireland and the Government of Italy renewing for a Further Period of Five Years the Agreement providing for the Settlement by Arbitration of Certain Classes of Questions which may arise between the Two Governments of 1 February 1904
- 1924 – Exchange of Notes between the Government of the United Kingdom of Great Britain and Ireland, and the Government of Spain, further renewing the Agreement providing for the Settlement by Arbitration of Certain Classes of Questions
- 1924 – Exchange of Notes between the Government of the United Kingdom of Great Britain and Ireland, and the Government of Sweden, amending and renewing the Convention providing for the Settlement by Arbitration of Certain Classes of Questions
- 1925 – Agreement between the Government of the United Kingdom of Great Britain and Ireland and the Government of Finland in regard to the Reciprocal Recognition of Tonnage Measurement Certificates of British and Finnish Ships
- 1925 – Exchange of Notes between the Government of the United Kingdom of Great Britain and Ireland [and on behalf of Australia and New Zealand] and the Government of Finland extending to Certain Mandated Territories the Treaty
- 1925 – Exchange of Notes between the Government of the United Kingdom of Great Britain and Ireland and the Government of Norway amending and further renewing the Convention providing for the Settlement by Arbitration of Certain Questions
- 1925 – Exchange of Notes between the Government of the United Kingdom of Great Britain and Ireland and the Government of the Netherlands amending and renewing the Convention providing for the Settlement by Arbitration of Certain Questions
- 1925 – Exchange of Notes between the United Kingdom of Great Britain and Ireland, and Portugal, renewing for a Further Period of Two Years the Agreement providing for the Settlement by Arbitration of Certain Classes of Questions
- 1926 – Exchange of Notes constituting an Agreement between the Government of the United Kingdom of Great Britain and Ireland and the Government of Czechoslovakia relative to the Reduced Rate of Customs Duty to be Levied on Printed Matter in English Advertising Products of British Industry imported into Czechoslovakia
- 1926 – Agreement between the United Kingdom of Great Britain and Ireland (and on behalf of Australia, Canada, India, the Irish Free State, Newfoundland, New Zealand and South Africa) and Estonia regarding Tonnage Measurement of Merchant Ships, and Exchange of Notes
- 1926 – Agreement between the Government of the United Kingdom of Great Britain and Northern Ireland (and on behalf of Australia, Canada, India, the Irish Free State, Newfoundland, New Zealand and South Africa) and the Government of Greece respecting the Measurement of Tonnage of Merchant Ships, and Exchange of Notes
- 1926 – Agreement between the Government of the United Kingdom of Great Britain and Northern Ireland (and on behalf of Australia, Canada, India, the Irish Free State, Newfoundland, New Zealand and South Africa) and the Government of Portugal in regard to Tonnage Measurement of Merchant Ships, and Exchange of Notes
- 1926 – Agreement between Australia and New Zealand amending Clause 2 of, and Item 26 of the Schedule to, the Trade Agreement of 11 April 1922
- 1926 – Exchange of Notes constituting an Agreement between the Government of the United Kingdom of Great Britain and Ireland and the Government of Norway for the Reciprocal Exchange of Information concerning Persons of Unsound Mind
- 1927 – Agreement between the Governments of Australia, Canada, India, the Irish Free State, New Zealand, South Africa and the United Kingdom of Great Britain and Northern Ireland, and the Government of the Latvian Republic, relating to Tonnage Measurement Certificates
- 1927 – Arbitration Convention between the United Kingdom of Great Britain and Ireland, and Siam
- 1927 – Convention between the United Kingdom of Great Britain and Ireland, and Denmark, amending and further renewing the Convention providing for the Settlement by Arbitration of Certain Classes of Questions which may arise between the Two Governments of 25 October 1905
- 1927 – Convention between the United Kingdom of Great Britain and Ireland, and Iceland [amending and further] renewing the Arbitration Convention of 25 October 1905
- 1927 – Exchange of Notes between the United Kingdom of Great Britain and Ireland, and Portugal, amending and further renewing the Agreement providing for the Settlement by Arbitration of Certain Classes of Questions which may arise between the Two Governments of 16 November 1914
- 1929 – Exchange of Notes annexed to the Treaty between the Government of the United Kingdom of Great Britain and Northern Ireland and the Government of the Republic of China relating to the Chinese Customs Tariff, etc.
- 1929 – Exchange of Notes constituting an Agreement between the Government of the United Kingdom of Great Britain and Northern Ireland [and on behalf of Australia and India] and the Government of Italy concerning the Reciprocal Recognition of Passenger Ships' Certificates and Emigrant Ship Regulations
- 1930 – Exchange of Notes constituting an Agreement between the United Kingdom and Egypt establishing a Commercial Modus Vivendi
- 1931 – Trade Agreement between Australia and Canada
- 1932 – Trade Agreement between Australia and the United Kingdom of Great Britain and Northern Ireland
- 1933 – Convention between the United Kingdom and the Republic of Austria regarding Legal Proceedings in Civil and Commercial Matters
- 1933 – Convention between the United Kingdom and the Czechoslovak Republic relative to Legal Proceedings in Civil and Commercial Matters
- 1933 – Convention between the United Kingdom and Estonia regarding Legal Proceedings in Civil and Commercial Matters
- 1933 – Convention between the United Kingdom and Germany regarding Legal Proceedings in Civil and Commercial Matters
- 1933 – Convention between the United Kingdom and Italy regarding Legal Proceedings in Civil and Commercial Matters
- 1933 – Convention between the United Kingdom and Norway regarding Legal Proceedings in Civil and Commercial Matters
- 1933 – Convention between the United Kingdom and Poland regarding Legal Proceedings in Civil and Commercial Matters
- 1933 – Convention between the United Kingdom and the Portuguese Republic regarding Legal Proceedings in Civil and Commercial Matters
- 1933 – Convention between the United Kingdom and Spain regarding Legal Proceedings in Civil and Commercial Matters
- 1933 – Convention between the United Kingdom and Sweden regarding Legal Proceedings in Civil and Commercial Matters
- 1933 – Exchange of Notes constituting an Agreement between the Government of Australia and the Government of Belgium regarding Commercial Relations
- 1933 – Trade Agreement between the Commonwealth of Australia and the Dominion of New Zealand
- 1934 – Exchange of Notes between the Government of Australia and the Government of Belgium respecting Commercial Relations
- 1935 – Convention between the United Kingdom of Great Britain and Northern Ireland (and on behalf of Australia, Canada, India and New Zealand) and the Republic of Poland relating to the Tonnage Measurement of Merchant Ships
- 1935 – Exchange of Notes constituting a Trade Agreement between the Government of Australia and the Government of the Union of South Africa
- 1935 – Exchange of Notes constituting an Agreement between the Government of the United Kingdom of Great Britain and Northern Ireland (and on behalf of Australia, Canada and New Zealand) and the Government of Iceland further renewing the Convention providing for the Settlement by Arbitration of Certain Classes of Questions which may arise between the Two Governments of 25 October 1905
- 1936 – Convention between the United Kingdom and the Czechoslovak Republic supplementary to the Convention relative to Legal Proceedings in Civil and Commercial Matters of 11 November 1924
- 1936 – Exchange of Notes between United Kingdom (and on behalf of Australia, Canada, India and New Zealand) and Poland extending to Danzig the Convention relating to the Tonnage Measurement of Merchant Ships of 16 April 1934
- 1937 – Convention Between His Majesty in Respect of the United Kingdom and the Regent of the Kingdom of Hungary Regarding Legal Proceedings in Civil and Commercial Matters
- 1937 – Convention Between Great Britain and Northern Ireland and Iraq Regarding Legal Proceedings in Civil and Commercial Matters
- 1937 – Civil Procedure Convention Between Great Britain and Lithuania
- 1937 – Provisional Commercial Agreement Between the Commonwealth of Australia and the Belgo-Luxembourg Economic Union
- 1937 – Treaty of Commerce Between the Commonwealth of Australia and the Czechoslovak Republic
- 1937 – Exchange of Notes between the Government of the Commonwealth of Australia and the Government of the French Republic constituting a Commercial Agreement
- 1937 – Exchange of Notes constituting an Agreement between the Government of the United Kingdom of Great Britain and Northern Ireland (and on behalf of Australia, Canada and New Zealand) and the Government of Iceland extending indefinitely the Convention providing for the Settlement by Arbitration of Certain Classes of Questions which may arise between the Two Governments of 25 October 1905
- 1938 – Convention between the United Kingdom and Greece regarding Legal Proceedings in Civil and Commercial Matters
- 1938 – Convention between the United Kingdom and Yugoslavia regarding Legal Proceedings in Civil and Commercial Matters
- 1938 – Commercial Agreement between Australia and Switzerland, and Four Exchanges of Letters
- 1939 – Exchange of Notes constituting an Agreement between the Government of the Commonwealth of Australia and the Government of Newfoundland on Trade Preferences
- 1940 – Exchange of Notes constituting an Agreement between the Government of the Commonwealth of Australia and the Government of the Republic of Brazil regulating Commercial Relations
- 1940 – Exchange of Notes constituting an Agreement between the Government of the Commonwealth of Australia and the Government of the Kingdom of Greece regarding Commercial Relations
- 1941 – Trade Agreement between Australia and Southern Rhodesia
- 1946 – Exchange of Notes between the Government of the Commonwealth of Australia and the Government of Canada amending for the Period 13 August-31 December 1946, the Trade Agreement of 8 July 1931, as regards Duty on Oranges Imported into Canada
- 1948 – Exchange of Notes constituting an Agreement between the Government of Australia and the Government of Italy granting Transit and Non- Traffic Rights to Qantas to Rome
- 1948 – Exchange of Notes constituting an Agreement between the Government of Australia and the Government of Czechoslovakia amending the Treaty of Commerce of 3 August 1936
- 1949 – Agreement between the Government of the Commonwealth of Australia and the Government of Pakistan relating to Air Services, and Exchange of Notes
- 1949 – Agreement between the Government of the Commonwealth of Australia and the Government of India relating to Air Services, and Exchange of Notes
- 1950 – Agreement between the Government of the Commonwealth of Australia and the Government of Ceylon for the Establishment of Air Services, and Two Exchanges of Notes
- 1950 – Exchange of Letters constituting an Agreement between the Government of Australia and the Government of the United Kingdom of Great Britain and Northern Ireland regarding Traffic Rights of Qantas at Suva
- 1950 – Exchanges of Notes constituting a Temporary Air Agreement between the Government of Australia and the Government of the Philippines
- 1951 – Agreement between the Government of the Commonwealth of Australia and the Government of the Kingdom of the Netherlands for the Establishment of Air Services
- 1951 – Agreement between the Governments of Australia and Canada for Air Services between Australia and Canada
- 1951 – Exchange of Notes constituting an Agreement between the Government of Australia and the Government of the State of Israel on Most-Favoured-Nation Treatment
- 1952 – Exchange of Notes constituting an Agreement between the Government of Australia and the Government of Austria reviving the Convention on Legal Proceedings in Civil and Commercial Matters of 31 March 1931
- 1952 – Agreement between the Government of the Commonwealth of Australia and the Government of Egypt for the Establishment of Scheduled Air Services, and Exchange of Notes
- 1952 – Exchange of Notes constituting an Agreement between the Government of Australia and the Government of Iceland regarding Most-Favoured-Nation Tariff Treatment
- 1952 – Exchange of Notes constituting an Agreement between the Government of Australia and the Government of New Zealand to amend Article X of the Trade Agreement of 5 September 1933
- 1953 – Exchanges of Notes constituting an Agreement between the Government of Australia and the Government of Thailand regarding Exercise of Traffic Rights at Bangkok by Qantas
- 1954 – Agreement between the Government of the Commonwealth of Australia and the Government of the Lebanese Republic for the Establishment of Air Services, and Two Exchanges of Notes
- 1954 – Exchange of Notes between the Government of Australia and the Government of Belgium modifying the Provisional Commercial Agreement of 3 October 1936
- 1955 – Agreement between the Government of the Commonwealth of Australia and the Government of the Union of South Africa relating to Air Services between their Respective Territories
- 1955 – Exchange of Notes constituting an Agreement between the Government of Australia and the Government of Egypt modifying the Annex to the Agreement for the Establishment of Scheduled Air Services of 14 June 1952
- 1955 – Trade Agreement between the Governments of the Commonwealth of Australia and the Federation of Rhodesia and Nyasaland
- 1956 – Agreement between the Commonwealth of Australia and Japan for Air Services, and Exchange of Notes
- 1956 – Exchange of Notes constituting an Agreement between the Government of Australia and the Government of the Federation of Rhodesia and Nyasaland relating to the Operative Date of the Trade Agreement of 30 June 1955
- 1957 – United Kingdom-Australia Trade Agreement [UKATA]
- 1957 – Exchange of Notes constituting an Agreement between the Government of Australia and the Government of the Federation of Rhodesia and Nyasaland amending the Trade Agreement of 30 June 1955
- 1957 – Exchanges of Notes constituting an Agreement between the Government of Australia and the Government of the United States of America amending Article II and the Annex to the Air Transport Agreement of 3 December 1946
- 1957 – Agreement on Commerce between the Commonwealth of Australia and Japan, and Four Exchanges of Notes
- 1957 – Exchange of Notes constituting an Agreement between the Government of Australia and the Government of the Republic of Ireland relating to Air Services
- 1958 – Supplementary Convention on the Abolition of Slavery, the Slave Trade, and Institutions and Practices similar to Slavery
- 1958 – Agreement between the Government of the Commonwealth of Australia and the Government of the United Kingdom of Great Britain and Northern Ireland for Air Services between and through their Respective Territories
- 1958 – Exchange of Notes constituting an Agreement between the Government of Australia and the Government of the Union of South Africa relating to Air Services and superseding the Agreement relating to Air Services of 4 November 1955
- 1958 – Trade Agreement between the Commonwealth of Australia and the Federation of Malaya
- 1959 – Convention on Damage Caused by Foreign Aircraft to Third Parties on the Surface
- 1959 – Agreement between the Commonwealth of Australia and the Federal Republic of Germany relating to Air Transport, and Exchanges of Notes
- 1959 – Agreement on the Joint Financing of certain Air Navigation Services in Greenland and the Faroe Islands
- 1959 – Agreement on the Joint Financing of Certain Air Navigation Services in Iceland
- 1959 – Universal Postal Convention, and Final Protocol; Detailed Regulations; Provisions concerning Air Mail, and Final Protocol
- 1959 – Agreement between the Government of the Commonwealth of Australia and the Government of the Federation of Malaya relating to Air Services
- 1959 – Trade Agreement between the Government of the Commonwealth of Australia and the Government of the Federal Republic of Germany, and Two Exchanges of Notes
- 1959 – Exchange of Notes constituting an Agreement between the Government of Australia and the Government of the United States of America concerning the Reciprocal Acceptance of Certificates of Airworthiness for Imported Aircraft
- 1959 – Exchange of Notes constituting an Agreement between the Government of Australia and the Government of the Federation of Rhodesia and Nyasaland amending the Trade Agreement of 30 June 1955
- 1959 – Trade Agreement between the Government of the Commonwealth of Australia and the Government of the Republic of Indonesia
- 1960 – Agreement between the Government of the Commonwealth of Australia and the Government of the Kingdom of Thailand relating to Air Services
- 1960 – Trade Agreement between the Government of the Commonwealth of Australia and the Government of Canada
- 1960 – Exchange of Notes constituting an Agreement between the Government of Australia and the Government of the Republic of Indonesia extending the Trade Agreement of 17 December 1959
- 1960 – Exchange of Notes constituting an Agreement between the Government of Australia and the Government of India amending the Agreement relating to Air Services, Annex and Exchange of Notes of 11 July 1949
- 1961 – Exchange of Notes constituting an Agreement between the Government of Australia and the Government of the Federation of Rhodesia and Nyasaland further amending the Trade Agreement of 30 June 1955
- 1961 – Exchange of Notes constituting an Agreement between the Government of Australia and the Government of the Republic of Indonesia further extending the Trade Agreement of 17 December 1959
- 1961 – Agreement between the Government of the Commonwealth of Australia and the Government of New Zealand relating to Air Services
- 1961 – [First] Protocol to the Trade Agreement between the Government of the Commonwealth of Australia and the Government of the Federal Republic of Germany of 14 October 1959
- 1962 – Exchange of Notes constituting an Agreement between the Government of Australia and the Government of the Republic of Indonesia amending and further extending the Trade Agreement of 17 December 1959
- 1963 – Exchange of Notes constituting an Agreement between the Government of Australia and the Government of the United Kingdom of Great Britain and Northern Ireland to amend the Schedule to the Air Services Agreement of 7 February 1958
- 1963 – Agreement between the Government of the Commonwealth of Australia and the Government of the Italian Republic relating to Air Services
- 1963 – Exchange of Notes constituting an Agreement between the Government of Australia and the Government of the Federation of Rhodesia and Nyasaland further amending the Trade Agreement of 30 June 1955
- 1963 – Exchange of Notes constituting an Agreement between the Government of Australia and the Government of the Republic of Indonesia further extending the Trade Agreement of 17 December 1959
- 1963 – Exchange of Letters constituting an Agreement between the Government of Australia and the Government of New Zealand on the Application of Anti-Dumping Legislation
- 1964 – Exchange of Notes constituting an Agreement between the Government of the Commonwealth of Australia and the Government of Southern Rhodesia for the Continued Application to Southern Rhodesia of the Trade Agreement of 30 June 1955, as amended
- 1964 – Australian Treaty Series 1964 No 9 – Agreement between the Government of the Commonwealth of Australia and the Government of Malaysia relating to Air Services
- 1964 – Protocol between the Government of Australia and the Government of Japan amending the Agreement on Commerce of 6 July 1957, and Exchanges of Notes
- 1964 – Exchange of Notes constituting an Agreement between the Government of Australia and the Government of the Republic of Indonesia further extending the Trade Agreement of 17 December 1959
- 1965 – Agreement between the Government of the Commonwealth of Australia and the Government of the French Republic relating to Air Transport
- 1965 – Trade Agreement between the Government of the Commonwealth of Australia and the Government of the Republic of the Philippines, and Agreed Minutes
- 1965 – Exchange of Notes constituting an Agreement between the Government of the Commonwealth of Australia and the Government of India amending Article VI of the Agreement relating to Air Services of 11 July 1949, as amended
- 1965 – Exchange of Notes constituting an Agreement between the Government of the Commonwealth of Australia and the Government of the Republic of Indonesia further extending the Trade Agreement of 17 December 1959
- 1965 – Trade Agreement between the Government of the Commonwealth of Australia and the Government of the Republic of Korea
- 1965 – Trade Agreement between the Government of the Commonwealth of Australia and the Government of the Union of Soviet Socialist Republics
- 1966 – New Zealand – Australia Free Trade Agreement
- 1966 – Agreement between the Government of the Commonwealth of Australia and the Imperial Government of Iran for Air Services between their Respective Territories
- 1966 – Agreement between the Government of the Commonwealth of Australia and the Imperial Government of Iran for Air Services between their Respective Territories
- 1966 – Trade Agreement between the Government of the Commonwealth of Australia and the Government of the People's Republic of Bulgaria
- 1966 – Exchange of Notes constituting an Agreement between the Government of Australia and the Government of the Republic of Indonesia further extending the Trade Agreement of 17 December 1959
- 1966 – Exchange of Notes constituting an Agreement further amending the Schedule to the Agreement between the Government of Australia and the Government of the United Kingdom of Great Britain and Northern Ireland relating to Air Services of 7 February 1958
- 1967 – Agreement between the Government of the Commonwealth of Australia and the Austrian Federal Government relating to Air Services
- 1967 – Trade Agreement between the Government of the Commonwealth of Australia and the Government of the Socialist Republic of Romania
- 1967 – Exchange of Notes constituting an Agreement between the Government of Australia and the Government of the Republic of Indonesia further extending the Trade Agreement of 17 December 1959
- 1967 – Agreement between the Government of the Commonwealth of Australia and the Government of Malaysia relating to Air Services
- 1967 – Agreement between the Government of the Commonwealth of Australia and the Government of the Republic of Singapore relating to Air Services
- 1967 – Trade Agreement between the Government of the Commonwealth of Australia and the Government of the Hungarian People's Republic
- 1968 – Trade Agreement between the Government of the Commonwealth of Australia and the Government of the Republic of China, and Agreed Minutes
- 1968 – Exchange of Notes constituting an Agreement between the Government of Australia and the Government of Malaysia amending the Trade Agreement of 26 August 1958
- 1968 – Exchange of Notes constituting an Agreement between the Government of Australia and the Government of the Republic of Indonesia for the further extension of the Trade Agreement of 17 December 1959
- 1969 – Agreement between the Government of the Commonwealth of Australia and the Government of the Republic of Indonesia for Air Services Between and Beyond their Respective Territory
- 1969 – Agreement between the Government of the Commonwealth of Australia and the Government of the Republic of Nauru relating to Air Services
- 1970 – Exchange of Notes between the Government of Australia and the Government of the Republic of Indonesia constituting an Agreement further extending the Trade Agreement of 17 December 1959
- 1970 – Agreement between the Government of the Commonwealth of Australia and the Government of the Republic of South Africa relating to Air Services
- 1970 – Convention on Offences and Certain other Acts Committed on Board Aircraft
- 1970 – Exchange of Notes constituting an Agreement between the Government of Australia and the Government of New Zealand to amend Article IV of the Trade Agreement of 5 September 1933
- 1971 – Exchange of Notes constituting an Agreement between the Government of Australia and the Government of France amending the Schedule to the Agreement relating to Air Transport of 13 April 1965
- 1971 – Exchange of Notes constituting an Agreement between the Government of Australia and the Government of Malaysia amending the Agreement relating to Air Services of 9 October 1967
- 1971 – Trade Agreement between the Government of the Commonwealth of Australia and the Government of the Socialist Federal Republic of Yugoslavia, and Exchanges of Letters
- 1971 – Agreement between the Government of the Commonwealth of Australia and the Government of the Kingdom of Greece relating to Air Services
- 1972 – Exchange of Notes constituting an Agreement between the Government of Australia and the Government of the Republic of Indonesia further extending the Trade Agreement of 17 December 1959
- 1972 – Air Transport Agreement between the Government of the Commonwealth of Australia and the Government of the Republic of the Philippines
- 1972 – Agreement on Trade Relations between the Commonwealth of Australia and the Czechoslovak Socialist Republic
- 1972 – Exchange of Notes constituting an Agreement between the Government of Australia and the Government of the United Kingdom of Great Britain and Northern Ireland amending the Trade Agreement of 26 February 1957
- 1973 – Agreement between the Government of the Commonwealth of Australia and the Government of Malaysia relating to Air Services
- 1973 – Agreement on the Development of Trade and Economic Relations between Australia and the Union of Soviet Socialist Republics
- 1973 – Trade Agreement between the Government of Australia and the Government of the People's Republic of China
- 1973 – Trade Agreement between the Government of the Commonwealth of Australia and the Government of the Republic of Indonesia, and Agreed Minute
- 1973 – Exchange of Notes constituting an Agreement between the Government of Australia and the Government of the Kingdom of the Netherlands amending the Annex to the Agreement for the Establishment of Air Services of 25 September 1951
- 1973 – Exchange of Letters constituting an Agreement between the Government of Australia and the Government of Canada concerning the Future Operation of the Trade Agreement of 12 February 1960
- 1974 – Trade Agreement between the Government of Australia and the Government of the German Democratic Republic, and Agreed Minute
- 1974 – Exchange of Notes constituting an Agreement between the Government of Australia and the Government of Canada amending the Air Services Agreement of 11 June 1946 and cancelling Amending Agreement of 16 March 1951
- 1974 – Exchange of Notes constituting an Agreement between the Government of Australia and the Government of the Federal Republic of Germany amending the Agreement relating to Air Transport of 22 May 1957
- 1974 – Trade Agreement between the Government of Australia and the Imperial Government of Iran
- 1974 – Exchange of Notes constituting an Agreement between the Government of Australia and the Government of the People's Republic of China concerning the Registration of Trade Marks
- 1974 – Trade Agreement between the Government of Australia and the Government of the Hungarian People's Republic, and Agreed Minute
- 1974 – Trade Agreement between the Government of Australia and the Government of the Democratic Republic of Viet-Nam
- 1974 – Trade Agreement between the Government of Australia and the Government of the People's Republic of Bulgaria
- 1975 – Exchange of Notes constituting an Agreement between the Government of Australia and the Government of the United Kingdom of Great Britain and Northern Ireland amending the Schedule to the Agreement for Air Services Between and Through their Respective Territories of 7 February 1958
- 1975 – Exchange of Letters constituting an Agreement between the Government of Australia and the Government of Malaysia concerning the Future Operation of the Trade Agreement of 26 August 1958
- 1975 – Exchange of Notes constituting an Agreement between the Government of Australia and the Government of the United States of America relating to Reciprocal Acceptance of Airworthiness Certificates
- 1975 – Agreement on the Development of Trade and Economic Relations between the Government of Australia and the Government of the Republic of Korea
- 1975 – Agreement on Trade and Industrial and Technical Co-operation between the Government of Australia and the Government of the Socialist Republic of Romania
- 1975 – Exchange of Letters constituting an Agreement between the Government of Australia and the Government of New Zealand on Rules of Origin governing Preferential Trade
- 1975 – Agreement between the Government of Australia and the Government of the Socialist Federal Republic of Yugoslavia relating to Air Services
- 1976 – Exchange of Notes constituting an Agreement between the Government of Australia and the Government of the Republic of Singapore amending the Agreement relating to Air Services of 3 November 1967
- 1976 – Trade Agreement between the Government of Australia and the Government of India
- 1976 – Air Transport Agreement between the Government of Australia and the Council of Ministers of the Socialist Republic of the Union of Burma
- 1976 – Exchange of Notes constituting an Agreement between the Government of Australia and the Government of the Republic of Nauru amending the Agreement relating to Air Services of 17 September 1969
- 1977 – Agreement on Trade and Commercial Relations between the Government of Australia and the Government of Papua New Guinea
- 1977 – Protocol to the Trade Agreement between the Government of Australia and the Government of the German Democratic Republic of 28 February 1974
- 1977 – Exchange of Letters constituting an Agreement between the Government of Australia and the Government of New Zealand concerning the extension of the Assured Duration of the New Zealand-Australia Free Trade Agreement of 31 August 1965
- 1978 – Trade Agreement between the Government of Australia and the Government of the Federative Republic of Brazil
- 1979 – Trade Agreement between the Government of Australia and the Government of the Republic of the Philippines
- 1979 – Trade Agreement between the Government of Australia and the Government of the Kingdom of Thailand
- 1979 – Agreement on Trade and Economic Relations and Technical Co-operation between the Government of Australia and the Government of the State of Bahrain
- 1980 – Exchange of Notes constituting an Agreement between the Government of Australia and the Government of the United States of America constituting an Agreement amending the Air Transport Agreement of 3 December 1946, as amended
- 1980 – Agreement on Trade, Economic and Technical Co-operation between the Government of Australia and the Government of the Republic of Iraq
- 1980 – Agreement between the Government of Australia and the Government of Papua New Guinea relating to Air Services
- 1980 – Exchange of Letters comprising an Agreement between Australia and the European Economic Community on trade in Mutton, Lamb and Goatmeat
- 1982 – Agreement on Trade, Economic And Technical Co-operation between the Government of Australia and the Government of the Sultanate of Oman
- 1982 – Exchange of Notes constituting an Agreement on the continued application of the Agreement on Trade and Commercial Relations between Australia and Papua New Guinea of 6 November 1976
- 1982 – Agreement between the Government of Australia and the Government of Fiji for Air Services between and beyond their Respective Territories
- 1982 – Exchange of Notes constituting an Agreement between the Government of Australia and the Government of New Zealand to amend the Agreement relating to Air Service of 25 July 1961
- 1983 – Australia New Zealand Closer Economic Relations Trade Agreement, and Exchange of Letters
- 1983 – Exchange of Notes constituting an Agreement between the Government of Australia and the Government of New Zealand amending the Agreement relating to Air Services of 25 July 1961, as amended
- 1983 – Trade Agreement between the Government of Australia and the Government of the Republic of Cyprus
- 1984 – Agreement between the Government of Australia and the Government of the People's Republic of China relating to Civil Air Transport
- 1984 – Exchange of Notes constituting an Agreement between the Government of Australia and the Government of the Republic of Nauru to further amend the Schedule to the Agreement relating to Air Services of 17 September 1969
- 1985 – Exchange of Letters constituting an Agreement between the Government of Australia and the Government of the United States of America concerning Trade in Certain Steel Products, with attached Arrangement
- 1985 – Exchange of Notes constituting an Agreement amending the Agreement between the Government of Australia and the Government of the United Kingdom of Great Britain and Northern Ireland for Air Services between and through their Respective Territories 1958, as amended
- 1985 – Exchange of Notes constituting an Agreement between the Government of Australia and the Government of the Kingdom of Thailand to amend the Schedule to the Agreement relating to Air Services of 26 February 1960
- 1985 – Agreement on Trade and Economic Relations and Technical Co-operation between the Government of Australia and the Government of the United Arab Emirates
- 1985 – Exchange of Notes constituting an Agreement between the Government of Australia and the Government of Malaysia to amend the Route Schedule to the Agreement relating to Air Services of 4 October 1972
- 1986 – Exchange of Notes constituting an Agreement between the Government of Australia and the Government of Japan to amend the Schedule to the Agreement for Air Services of 19 January 1956
- 1986 – Exchange of Notes constituting an Agreement between the Government of Australia and the Government of Indonesia to amend the Annex to the Agreement for Air Services between and beyond their respective Territories of 7 March 1969
- 1986 – Exchange of Notes constituting an Agreement between the Government of Australia and the Government of the People's Republic of China to amend the Trade Agreement of 24 July 1973
- 1987 – Exchange of Notes constituting an Agreement between the Government of Australia and the Government of Japan to further amend the Schedule to the Agreement for Air Services of 19 January 1956
- 1987 – Exchange of Notes constituting an Agreement between the Government of Australia and the Government of the United States of America to amend the Air Transport Agreement of 3 December 1946
- 1988 – Trade Agreement between the Government of Australia and the Government of the Hashemite Kingdom of Jordan
- 1988 – Agreement between the Government of Australia and the Government of Canada relating to Air Services
- 1988 – Protocol on Harmonisation of Quarantine Administrative Procedures to the Australia New Zealand Closer Economic Relations – Trade Agreement
- 1988 – Protocol to the Australia New Zealand Closer Economic Relations – Trade Agreement on Acceleration of Free Trade in Goods
- 1988 – Exchange of Notes constituting an Agreement between the Government of Australia and the Government of the United Kingdom of Great Britain and Northern Ireland to amend the Agreement for Air Services between and through their Respective Territories of 7 February 1958
- 1988 – Protocol on Trade in Services to the Australia New Zealand Closer Economic Relations – Trade Agreement
- 1988 – Agreement on Trade between the Government of Australia and the Government of the Arab Republic of Egypt
- 1988 – Exchange of Letters constituting an Agreement between the Government of Australia and the Government of New Zealand to amend the Australia New Zealand Closer Economic Relations – Trade Agreement (ANZCERTA) of 28 March 1983
- 1989 – Exchange of Notes constituting an Agreement between the Government of Australia and the Government of the United States of America to amend the Air Transport Agreement of 3 December 1946, as amended
- 1989 – Agreement on Trade, Economic and Technical Co-operation between the Government of Australia and the Government of the Republic of Turkey
- 1989 – Agreement on Trade and Economic Relations and Technical Co-operation between the Government of Australia and the Government of Israel
- 1989 – Exchange of Notes constituting an Agreement between the Government of Australia and the Government of Japan to amend the Agreement for Air Services of 19 January 1956
- 1989 – Trade Agreement between the Government of Australia and the Government of the Federal Republic of Nigeria
- 1990 – Exchange of Letters constituting an Agreement between the Government of Australia and the European Economic Community to amend the Agreement on Trade in Mutton, Lamb and Goatmeat of 14 November 1980
- 1990 – Exchange of Letters constituting an Agreement between the Government of Australia and the Government of the United States of America embodying an Arrangement concerning Trade in Certain Steel Products and a Framework for Arrangement on Steel Trade Liberalization.
- 1990 – Agreement on Trade and Economic Co-operation between Australia and the Socialist Republic of Vietnam
- 1990 – Trade Agreement between the Government of Australia and the Government of the Islamic Republic of Pakistan
- 1990 – Agreement between the Government of Australia and the Government of New Zealand concerning Royal New Zealand Air Force Skyhawk Aircraft involvement in Australian Defence Force Air Defence Support Flying
- 1991 – Agreement on Trade and Commercial Relations between the Government of Australia and the Government of Papua New Guinea [PATCRA II]
- 1992 – Agreement on Technical Barriers to Trade (GATT Standards Code)
- 1992 – Agreement between the Government of Australia and the Government of the Republic of Korea relating to Air Services
- 1992 – Agreement between the Government of Australia and the Government of His Majesty the Sultan and Yang Di-Pertuan of Brunei Darussalam relating to Air Services
- 1992 – Exchange of Letters constituting an Agreement to delete Article 20.3 and Annex F from the Australia New Zealand Closer Economic Relations-Trade Agreement of 28 March 1983
- 1993 – Agreement between the Government of Australia and the Swiss Federal Council relating to Air Services
- 1993 – Agreement between the Government of Australia and the Government of the Republic of Vanuatu relating to Air Services
- 1993 – Exchange of Letters constituting an Agreement between Australia and the European Economic Community amending and extending the Agreement of 22 January 1990 which amended the Agreement on Trade in Mutton, Lamb and Goatmeat of 14 November 1980
- 1993 – Exchange of Notes constituting an Agreement to further amend the Schedule to the Agreement between Australia and Japan for Air Services of 19 January 1956
- 1993 – Agreement between the Government of Australia and the Government of Hong Kong concerning Air Services
- 1993 – Exchange of Notes constituting an Agreement to further amend the Agreement between the Government of Australia and the Government of the United Kingdom of Great Britain and Northern Ireland for Air Services between and through their Respective Territories of 7 February 1958, as amended
- 1993 – Exchange of Notes constituting an Agreement to amend the Schedule to the Agreement between the Government of Australia and the Government of the Republic of Korea relating to Air Services of 26 February 1992
- 1993 – Agreement between the Government of Australia and the Government of the Republic of Latvia on Trade and Economic Cooperation
- 1993 – Agreement between the Government of Australia and the Government of the Republic of Lithuania on Trade and Economic Cooperation
- 1993 – Exchange of Letters constituting an Agreement between Australia and the European Community further amending and extending the Agreement of 22 January 1990 which amended the Agreement on Trade in Mutton, Lamb and Goatmeat
- 1994 – Agreement between Australia and the European Community on Trade in Wine, and Protocol
- 1994 – Exchange of Notes constituting an Agreement between the Government of Australia and the Government of the United States of America to amend the Air Transport Agreement of 3 December 1946 and the Agreement concerning Capacity of 23 March 1989
- 1994 – Air Services Agreement between the Government of Australia and the Government of the Russian Federation
- 1994 – Exchange of Letters constituting an Agreement to amend Article 3.1 of the Australia New Zealand Closer Economic Relations – Trade Agreement of 28 March 1983
- 1994 – Exchange of Letters constituting an Agreement between Australia and the European Community further amending and extending the Agreement of 22 January 1990 which amended the Agreement on Trade in Mutton, Lamb and Goatmeat of 14 November 1980
- 1995 – Marrakesh Agreement establishing the World Trade Organization (WTO Agreement)
- 1995 – Agreement between the Government of Australia and the Government of the Republic of Mauritius relating to Air Services
- 1995 – Agreement between the Government of Australia and the Government of the Republic of South Africa relating to Air Services
- 1995 – Agreement between the Government of Australia and the Government of the Socialist Republic of Vietnam relating to Air Services
- 1995 – Agreement between the Government of Australia and the Government of the State of Bahrain relating to Air Services
- 1995 – Agreement on Trade-Related Aspects of Intellectual Property Rights
- 1995 – Final Act Embodying the Results of the Uruguay Rounds of Multilateral Trade Negotiations
- 1996 – Exchange of Notes constituting an Agreement to extend the Agreement between the Government of Australia and the Government of New Zealand concerning Royal New Zealand Air Force Skyhawk Aircraft involvement in Australian Defence Force Air Defence Support Flying of 13 July 1990
- 1996 – Agreement between the Government of Australia and the Government of Malta relating to Air Services
- 1996 – Exchanges of Notes constituting an Agreement between the Government of Australia and the Government of the Federal Republic of Germany to further amend the Route Schedule to the Agreement relating to Air Transport, and Exchange of Notes, of 22 May 1957
- 1997 – Agreement between the Government of Australia and the Government of Romania on Trade and Economic Cooperation
- 1997 – Agreement between the Government of Australia and the Government of New Zealand concerning Enhanced Involvement of the Royal New Zealand Air Force Skyhawk Aircraft in Australian Defence Force Air Defence Support Flying
- 1997 – Trade and Investment Agreement between the Government of Australia and the Government of the United Mexican States
- 1997 – Agreement between the Government of Australia and the Government of the Czech Republic on Trade and Economic Cooperation
- 1997 – Agreement between the Government of Australia and the Government of the Republic of Singapore concerning the Location of a RSAF [Republic of Singapore Air Force] Helicopter Squadron at the Army Aviation Centre Oakey
- 1998 – Trademark Law Treaty
- 1998 – Agreement between the Government of Australia and the Government of Malaysia on Trade and Economic Cooperation
- 1999 – Agreement between the Government of Australia and the Government of the Republic of Lebanon relating to Air Services -
- 1999 – Agreement between the Government of Australia and the Government of Macau concerning Air Services -
- 1999 – Agreement between the Government of Australia and the Government of Ukraine on Trade and Economic Cooperation -
- 1999 – Agreement between the Government of Australia and the Government of Fiji on Trade and Economic Relations [AFTERA] -
- 2000 – Agreement on Economic, Trade and Technical Cooperation between the Government of Australia and the Government of the Republic of Lebanon (Beirut, 11 March 1997) -
- 2000 – Agreement on Mutual Recognition in relation to Conformity Assessment, Certificates and Markings between Australia and the Republic of Iceland, the Principality of Liechtenstein and the Kingdom of Norway [European Free Trade Association – European Economic Area] (Brussels, 29 April 1999) -
- 2000 – Agreement between the Government of Australia and the Government of the Slovak Republic on Trade and Economic Cooperation -
- 2001 – Agreement Between the Government of Australia and the Government of Samoa relating to Air Services (Apia, 11 August 2000)
- 2002 – Agreement Between the Government of Australia and the Government of the Cook Islands relating to Air Services (Apia, 18 September 2001)
- 2003 – Singapore-Australia Free Trade Agreement (SAFTA) (Singapore, 17 February 2003)
- 2003 – Agreement Between the Government of Australia and the Government of New Zealand Relating to Air Services (Auckland, 8 August 2002)
- 2005 – Australia-US Free Trade Agreement (Washington, 18 May 2004)
- 2005 – Australia-Thailand Free Trade Agreement (Canberra, 5 July 2004)
- 2005 – Agreement Between the Government of Australia and the Government of the United Arab Emirates relating to Air Services (Dubai, 8 September 2002)
- 2005 – Agreement Between the Government of Australia and the Government of the Republic of Poland relating to Air Services (Warsaw, 28 April 2004)
- 2005 – Agreement Between the Government of Australia and the Government of the Republic of Chile Relating to Air Services (Santiago, 7 September 2001)
- 2006 – Singapore-Australia Free Trade Agreement Amendments: Sectoral Annex on Food Products; Sectoral Annex on Horticultural Goods; Section C: Documentary Evidence: Article 11: Certification of Origin; Annex 3A: Revised List of Australian Government Entities; Annex 4-III: Additional Commitments to Chapter 7 (Trade in Services) and Chapter 8 (Investment), (Singapore, 21 April 2005)
- 2006 – Agreement between the Government of Australia and the Government of the People's Republic of China relating to Air Services (Canberra, 23 March 2004)
- 2007 – Exchange of Letters constituting an Agreement Between the Government of Australia and the Government of New Zealand to Amend Article 3 of the Australia New Zealand Closer Economic Relations Trade Agreement (ANZCERTA) of 28 March 1983 (Wellington/Canberra, 12–19 December 2006)
- 2007 – Agreement Between The Government of Australia and the Government of India relating to Air Services (New Delhi, 6 March 2006)
- 2007 – Exchange of Notes constituting a treaty with the Government of the Republic of Singapore to Amend the Singapore – Australia Free Trade Agreement (SAFTA) (Singapore, 21 December 2006 & 13 February 2007)
- 2009 – Australia-Chile Free Trade Agreement (Canberra, 30 July 2008)
- 2009 – Agreement Between the Government of Australia and the European Community on Certain Aspects of Air Services (Brussels, 29 April 2008)
- 2010 – Exchange of Notes Constituting an Agreement to Amend Annexes 2-B (Tariff Schedule of Australia), 4-A (Textile or Apparel Specific Rules of Origin) and 5-A (Specific Rules of Origin) of the Australia-United States Free Trade Agreement (done at Washington on 18 May 2004) to Ensure Compliance with Changes to the Harmonized Commodity Description and Coding System. (Canberra, 18 December 2006)
- 2010 – Agreement between Australia and the European Community on Trade in Wine (Brussels, 1 December 2008)
- 2011 – Agreement between Australia and the Kingdom of Spain relating to Air Services (Canberra, 24 June 2009)
- 2011 – Agreement between the Government of Australia and the Government of the United Mexican States Relating to Air Services (Mexico City, 9 April 2010)
- 2011 – Agreement between the Government of Australia and the Swiss Federal Council relating to Air Services (Canberra, 28 November 2008)
- 2011 – Agreement between the Government of Australia and the Government of the Kingdom of Tonga relating to Air Services (Neiafu, Tonga, 23 August 2003)
- 2011 – Singapore-Australia Free Trade Agreement Amendments (Singapore on 27 July 2009)
- 2011 – Air Services Agreement between the Government of Australia and the Government of the Czech Republic (New York, 24 September 2010)
- 2011 – Exchange of Notes constituting an Amendment to the Agreement between the Government of Australia and the Government of the Socialist Republic of Vietnam relating to Air Services (Hanoi, 28 November 2011)
- 2011 – Exchange of Letters Constituting an Agreement between the Government of Australia and the Government of New Zealand to amend Annex G of the Australia New Zealand Closer Economic Relations Trade Agreement (ANZCERTA) (Canberra, 16 June 2010)
- 2012 – Agreement between the Government of Australia and the Government of the United Kingdom of Great Britain and Northern Ireland concerning Air Services (London, 10 July 2008)
- 2012 – Exchange of Letters constituting an Agreement to Amend Annex 4-A (Textile or Apparel Specific Rules of Origin) of the Australia-United States Free Trade Agreement (Washington, 18 May 2012)
- 2012 – Air Services Agreement between the Government of Australia and the Government of the Republic of Turkey (Ankara, 28 April 2010)
- 2012 – Exchange of Letters Constituting an Agreement between the Government of Australia and the Government of New Zealand to amend Article 3 of the Australia New Zealand Closer Economic Relations Trade Agreement (ANZCERTA) (Canberra, 16 June 2010)
- 2013 – Malaysia-Australia Free Trade Agreement (Kuala Lumpur, 22 May 2012)
- 2013 – Protocol on Investment to the Australia – New Zealand Closer Economic Relations Trade Agreement (Wellington, 16 February 2011)
- 2013 – Agreement between the Government of Australia and the Government of the Republic of the Philippines relating to Air Services (Canberra, 24 October 2012)
- 2013 – Air Transport Agreement between the Government of Australia and the Government of the United States of America (Washington DC, 31 March 2008)
- 2013 – Exchange of notes amending the Air Transport Agreement between the Government of Australia and the Government of the United States of America (Washington DC, 18 June 2013)
- 2013 – Agreement between the Government of Australia and the Government of the Democratic Socialist Republic of Sri Lanka relating to Air Services (Colombo, 3 May 2012)
- 2014 – Air Services Agreement between the Government of Australia and the Government of the Republic of Serbia (Belgrade, 14 May 2013)
- 2014 – Free Trade Agreement between the Government of Australia and the Government of the Republic of Korea (Seoul, 8 April 2014)
- 2015 – Amendment to Annex 15A (Government Procurement) of the Australia-Chile Free Trade Agreement (Santiago, 11 December 2014)
- 2015 – Free Trade Agreement between the Government of Australia and the Government of the People's Republic of China (Canberra, 17 June 2015)
- 2016 – Agreement between the Government of Australia and the Government of the Lao People's Democratic Republic Relating to Air Services (Brisbane, 4 July 2015)
- 2016 – Agreement Between the Government of Australia and the Government of the Republic of Indonesia relating to Air Services (Canberra, 7 February 2013)
