= List of Australian bilateral treaties on postal services and money orders =

Australian bilateral treaties on postal services and money orders are Australian treaties concerning postal services and money orders.

They date from 1881 to 1961, and ended with the Universal Postal Union and demise of the money order.

== List ==
- 1881 – Convention between Victoria and the United States of America for the Exchange of Money Orders (Melbourne-Washington, 5 October-9 December 1881)
- 1890 – Convention between the United Kingdom of Great Britain and Ireland and France respecting Postal Communications [mail packets] (London, 30 August 1890)
- 1897 – Convention between the United Kingdom of Great Britain and Ireland and France for the Exchange of [uninsured] Postal Parcels between Australia and France (Paris, 1 December 1897)
- 1898 – Additional Convention between the United Kingdom of Great Britain and Ireland and France [amending Article X] to the Convention for the Exchange of [uninsured] Postal Parcels between Australia and France of 1 December 1897 (Paris, 24 December 1898)
- 1903 – Convention for the Exchange of Money Orders between the Commonwealth of Australia and the Colony of Hong Kong
- 1903 – Convention between the Commonwealth of Australia and the Colony of New Zealand concerning the Exchange of Money Orders
- 1905 – Convention for the Exchange of Money Orders between the Commonwealth of Australia and the Colony of Ceylon
- 1905 – Parcels Post Convention between the Commonwealth of Australia and the United States of America
- 1906 – Convention between the Commonwealth of Australia and the Dominion of Canada for the Exchange of Money Orders
- 1906 – Convention between the Commonwealth of Australia and the Colony of Fiji concerning the Exchange of Money Orders
- 1906 – Agreement concerning an Exchange of Postal Parcels between the Commonwealth of Australia and the Empire of Japan
- 1906 – Convention between the Commonwealth of Australia and the Kingdom of Tonga concerning the Exchange of Money Orders
- 1909 – Agreement for an Exchange of Uninsured Postal Parcels between the Commonwealth of Australia and Ceylon [Sri Lanka]
- 1909 – Amendment to [Article 4 of] the Parcel Post Convention between Australia and the United States of America of 10 May 1905
- 1910 – Convention respecting the Exchange of Money Orders between the Commonwealth of Australia and Norway, and Detailed Regulations
- 1911 – Agreement for an Exchange of Postal Parcels between the Commonwealth of Australia and Ocean Island and Gilbert and Ellice Islands [Kiribati/Tuvalu]
- 1911 – Parcel Post Agreement between the Commonwealth of Australia and the Union of South Africa
- 1912 – Agreement between the General Post Office of the Commonwealth of Australia and the General Post Office of the Dutch East Indies for the Exchange of Money Orders
- 1912 – Agreement for an Exchange of Postal Parcels between the Commonwealth of Australia and the Dominion of New Zealand
- 1912 – Convention for the Exchange of Money Orders between the Postal Administration of the Commonwealth of Australia and the Postal Administration of the Union of South Africa
- 1912 – Further Amendment to [Article 4 of] the Parcels Post Convention between the Commonwealth of Australia and the United States of America of 10 May 1905
- 1913 – Convention between the Commonwealth of Australia and the United States of America for the Exchange of Money Orders
- 1914 – Agreement for an Exchange of Postal Parcels between the Commonwealth of Australia and the Dominion of Canada
- 1914 – Australian Treaty Series 1914 No 4 – Agreement between the Commonwealth of Australia and the British Solomon Islands Protectorate and the Gilbert and Ellice Islands Protectorate for the Exchange of Money Orders
- 1915 – Agreement for an Exchange of Postal Parcels between the Commonwealth of Australia and the Philippine Islands
- 1915 – Agreement between the Commonwealth of Australia and British New Guinea for the Exchange of Money Orders
- 1917 – Agreement between the Commonwealth of Australia and British North Borneo for the Exchange of Money Orders
- 1917 – Agreement between the Commonwealth of Australia and the Territory of Papua for the Exchange of Postal Notes
- 1920 – Agreement for an Exchange of Postal Parcels between the Commonwealth of Australia and [British] North Borneo
- 1921 – Convention Between the Commonwealth of Australia and the Federated Malay States, For the Exchange of Money Orders
- 1921 – Agreement Between the Commonwealth of Australia and Nauru for the Exchange of Money Orders
- 1923 – Agreement between the Commonwealth of Australia and the Dutch East Indies for the Exchange of Money Orders
- 1923 – Agreement between the Government of the Commonwealth of Australia and the Government of the Netherlands East Indies for the Exchange of Postal Parcels
- 1924 – Convention for the Exchange of Money Orders between the Postal Administration of the Commonwealth of Australia and the Postal Administration of Malta
- 1925 – Additional Articles between the Post Office of the Commonwealth of Australia and the Department of Communications of the Empire of Japan amending the Detailed Regulations of 9 October-14 December 1906 for the Execution
- 1925 – Agreement between the Government of Australia and the Government of New Zealand for the Exchange of Insured Postal Parcels
- 1926 – Agreement for an Exchange of Insured Postal Parcels between Australia and Fiji
- 1926 – Agreement for an Exchange of Uninsured Postal Parcels between Australia and Fiji
- 1926 – Convention for the Exchange of Money Orders between the Postal Administrations of Australia and Germany
- 1927 – Annex to the Agreement for an Exchange of Postal Parcels between Australia and Canada of 1 August-21 November 1913
- 1927 – Convention between the Postal Administration of the Commonwealth of Australia and the Postal Administration of Norway for the Direct Exchange of Uninsured Postal Parcels between the Commonwealth of Australia and Norway
- 1927 – Agreement concerning the Exchange of Postal Parcels between Australia and Switzerland
- 1929 – Convention for the Exchange of Money Orders between Australia and New Caledonia and Dependencies
- 1929 – Agreement for an Exchange of Uninsured Postal Parcels between Australia and British Solomon Islands
- 1932 – Agreement for an Exchange of Postal Parcels between the Commonwealth of Australia and Germany
- 1932 – Agreement for an Exchange of Postal Parcels between the Commonwealth of Australia and Italy
- 1932 – Agreement between the Commonwealth of Australia and the Territory of New Guinea for the Exchange of Postal Notes
- 1933 – Agreement for an Exchange of Postal Parcels between the Commonwealth of Australia and Hong Kong
- 1933 – Agreement for an Exchange of Postal Parcels between the Commonwealth of Australia and Netherlands Indies
- 1934 – Agreement for an Exchange of Postal Parcels between Australia and Egypt
- 1934 – Agreement for an Exchange of Postal Parcels between Australia and France
- 1934 – Agreement between the Post Office of the Commonwealth of Australia and the Post Office of Italy for the Exchange of Money Orders
- 1934 – Agreement for the Exchange of Postal Parcels between the Commonwealth of Australia and the Territory of Papua
- 1935 – Agreement between the Post Office of the Commonwealth of Australia and the Post Office of the Irish Free State for the Exchange of Money Orders
- 1935 – Agreement between the Postal Department of the Commonwealth of Australia and the Postal Department of Malaya for the Exchange of Money Orders
- 1937 – Agreement for an Exchange of Postal Parcels between the Commonwealth of Australia and Malaya
- 1938 – Exchange of Despatches constituting an Agreement between the Government of the Commonwealth of Australia and the Government of the United Kingdom of Great Britain and Northern Ireland relating to Air Transport of Mail
- 1940 – Arrangement for the Exchange of Parcels by Parcel Post between the Post Office of the Commonwealth of Australia and the Indian Post Office, and Detailed Regulations
- 1940 – Agreement for an Exchange of [insured and uninsured] Postal Parcels between the Commonwealth of Australia and Ceylon
- 1941 – Agreement for the Exchange of Telegraph Money Orders between the Commonwealth of Australia and Malaya
- 1941 – Agreement for the Exchange of Money Orders between the Commonwealth of Australia and India
- 1941 – Agreement for an Exchange of Postal Parcels between the Commonwealth of Australia and Aden, and Detailed Regulations
- 1949 – Parcel Post Agreement between the Commonwealth of Australia and the Republic of the Philippines
- 1949 – Agreement for the Exchange of Money Orders between the Commonwealth of Australia and Pakistan
- 1952 – Agreement between Australia and the United States of America concerning the Exchange of Parcel Post, and Regulations of Execution
- 1952 – Agreement for the Exchange of Postal Parcels between the Commonwealth of Australia and Pakistan, and Detailed Regulations
- 1953 – Agreement for an Exchange of Postal Parcels between the Commonwealth of Australia and the Kingdom of the Netherlands
- 1953 – Exchange of Notes between the Government of the United Kingdom of Great Britain and Ireland and the Government of Japan regarding the Agreement respecting the Tonnage Measurement of Merchant Ships of 30 November 1922
- 1954 – Agreement for the Exchange of [postal] Parcels between the Commonwealth of Australia and Greece
- 1954 – Agreement for the Exchange of Postal Parcels between the Commonwealth of Australia and the State of Israel
- 1954 – Agreement for an Exchange of Postal Parcels between the Commonwealth of Australia and the People's Republic of Poland
- 1954 – Agreement for an Exchange of Postal Parcels between the Commonwealth of Australia and Austria
- 1955 – Agreement for the Exchange of Postal Parcels between the Commonwealth of Australia and the Hungarian People's Republic
- 1955 – Agreement for the Exchange of Postal Parcels between the Commonwealth of Australia and the Republic of China [Taiwan]
- 1955 – Agreement for the Exchange of Postal Parcels between the Commonwealth of Australia and the Republic of Czechoslovakia
- 1956 – Agreement for an Exchange of Postal Parcels between the Commonwealth of Australia and the Federal People's Republic of Yugoslavia
- 1957 – Agreement between the Commonwealth of Australia and the Condominium of the New Hebrides for the Exchange of Money Orders
- 1958 – Agreement between the Government of the Commonwealth of Australia and the Government of the United States of America concerning the Exchange of Postal Parcels between the United States of America and the Territory of Papua and the Trust Territory of New Guinea, and Detailed Regulations
- 1959 – Agreement for an Exchange of Money Orders between the Commonwealth of Australia and the Kingdom of the Netherlands
- 1960 – Agreement for an Exchange of Postal Parcels between the Commonwealth of Australia and the Union of Soviet Socialist Republics
- 1960 – Exchange of Notes constituting an Agreement between the Government of Australia and the Government of the Kingdom of the Netherlands amending the Agreement for the Exchange of Postal Parcels of 22 October 1953
- 1961 – Agreement for the Exchange of International Money Orders between the Commonwealth of Australia and Japan
- 1961 – Exchange of Notes constituting an Agreement between the Government of Australia and the Government of the Kingdom of the Netherlands to amend the Agreement of 4 August 1959 amending the Agreement for the Exchange of Postal Parcels of 22 October 1953
- 1962 – Parcel Post Agreement between the Government of the Commonwealth of Australia and the Government of Japan
- 1962 – Agreement between the Government of the Commonwealth of Australia and the Governments of the Federation of Malaya and of the State of Singapore concerning the Exchange of Parcels by Parcel Post between Malaya and Christmas Island
- 1962 – Second Protocol between the Government of the Commonwealth of Australia and the Government of New Caledonia and Dependencies to the Agreement for the Exchange of Ordinary Postal Parcels of 17 August 1928, as amended
- 1963 – Agreement between the Commonwealth of Australia and the Federal Republic of Germany concerning the Exchange of Postal Parcels
- 1964 – Third Protocol between the Government of the Commonwealth of Australia and the Government of New Caledonia and Dependencies to the Agreement for the Exchange of Ordinary Postal Parcels of 17 August 1928, as amended
- 1965 – Agreement for an Exchange of Money Orders between the Commonwealth of Australia and Southern Rhodesia
- 1965 – Agreement between the Government of the Commonwealth of Australia and the Government of the Federal Republic of Germany regarding the Exchange of Money Orders
- 1969 – Agreement between the Government of the Commonwealth of Australia and the Government of Canada concerning Uninsured and Insured Parcels
- 1971 – Agreement between the Government of the Commonwealth of Australia and the Government of the Republic of South Africa concerning Postal Parcels
- 1973 – Agreement concerning the Exchange of Money Orders between Australia and Yugoslavia
- 1979 – Agreement on Postal Relations between the Government of Australia and the Government of the Socialist Republic of Viet Nam
- 1981 – Agreement between the Government of Australia and the Government of Malta for the Exchange of Money Orders
- 1981 – Agreement between the Government of Australia and the Government of the People's Republic of Bangladesh for the Exchange of Money Orders
- 1982 – Agreement for the Exchange of International Money Orders between the Government of Australia and the Government of the Republic of the Philippines
- 1985 – Agreement between the Government of Australia and the Government of Norway for the Exchange of Money Orders
- 1963 – Agreement between the Government of the Commonwealth of Australia and the Government of the United Kingdom of Great Britain and Northern Ireland concerning the Exchange of Money Orders between the Trust Territory of Nauru and the Gilbert and Ellice Islands Colony
