= List of Australian bilateral treaties on intellectual property =

Australian bilateral treaties on intellectual property are Australian treaties concerning patents, copyright and trademarks that were entered into from 1875-1963 before international conventions dominated regulations.

== List ==
- 1875 – Declaration between the Government of the United Kingdom of Great Britain and Ireland and the Government of Spain for the Protection of Trade Marks (London, 14 December 1875)
- 1877 – Declaration between the Government of the United Kingdom of Great Britain and Ireland and the Government of the United States of America for the Protection of Trade Marks (London, 24 October 1877)
- 1879 – Declaration between the United Kingdom of Great Britain and Ireland and Denmark for the Protection of Trade Marks (Copenhagen, 28 November 1879)
- 1880 – Declaration between the Government of the United Kingdom of Great Britain and Ireland and the Government of Portugal for the Protection of Trade Marks (London, 6 January 1880)
- 1880 – Declaration between the Government of the United Kingdom of Great Britain and Ireland and the Swiss Federal Council for the Reciprocal Protection of Manufacturing and Trade Marks (Berne, 6 November 1880)
- 1892 – Convention between the United Kingdom of Great Britain and Ireland and Ecuador relative to Trade Marks (Quito, 26 August 1892)
- 1892 – Convention between the United Kingdom of Great Britain and Ireland and Roumania relative to Trade Marks (Bucharest, 4 May 1892)
- 1893 – Convention between United Kingdom of Great Britain and Ireland and Austria-Hungary for the Establishment of International Copyright (Vienna, 24 April 1893)
- 1898 – Convention between the United Kingdom of Great Britain and Ireland and Costa Rica for the Reciprocal Protection of Trade Marks, etc. (Guatemala, 5 March 1898)
- 1898 – Convention between the United Kingdom of Great Britain and Ireland and Guatemala relative to Trade Marks (Guatemala, 20 July 1898)
- 1949 – Exchange of Notes constituting an Agreement between the Government of Australia and the Government of the United States of America for the Extension of Time for Copyright
- 1955 – Exchange of Notes constituting an Agreement between the Government of Australia and the Government of the Republic of China [Taiwan] regarding the Reciprocal Protection of Inventions and Trade Marks
- 1961 – Exchange of Notes constituting an Agreement between the Government of Australia and the Government of the United States of America relating to Procedures for the Reciprocal Filing of Classified Patent Applications under the Agreement to Facilitate the Interchange of Patent Rights and Technical Information for Defense Purposes of 24 January 1958
- 1963 – Agreement between the Government of the Commonwealth of Australia and the Government of the Republic of India with respect to the Mutual Protection of Priority of Patents for Inventions
