= List of Australian bilateral treaties on extradition and criminal matters =

Australian bilateral treaties on extradition and criminal matters are a set of Australian treaties concerning extradition, and cooperation in criminal matters.

== List ==
The absence of an extradition treaty does not, in theory, prevent an arrest and/or extradition either to or from that country.

=== Albania ===
- 1928 – Extradition Treaty between the United Kingdom of Great Britain and Northern Ireland and the Albanian Republic
- 1928 – Exchange of Notes between the Government of the United Kingdom of Great Britain and Northern Ireland [and on behalf of Australia, New Zealand and South Africa] and the Government of Albania extending to Certain Mandated Territories the Extradition the Government of Albania extending to Certain Mandated Territories the Extradition Treaty of 22 July 1926

=== Argentina ===
- 1889 – Treaty between the United Kingdom of Great Britain and Ireland and the Argentine Republic for the Mutual Extradition of Fugitive Criminals (Buenos Aires, 22 May 1889)
- 1990 – Treaty on Extradition between the Government of Australia and the Government of the Republic of Argentina
- 1993 – Treaty between the Government of Australia and the Government of the Argentine Republic on Mutual Assistance in Criminal Matters

=== Austria ===
- 1873 – Treaty between the United Kingdom of Great Britain and Ireland and Austria-Hungary for the Mutual Surrender of Fugitive Criminals of 3 December 1873
- 1873 – Declaration amending Article XI of the Treaty between the United Kingdom of Great Britain and Ireland and Austria-Hungary for the Mutual Surrender of Fugitive Criminals of 3 December 1873
- 1902 – Declaration amending Article XI of the Treaty between the United Kingdom of Great Britain and Ireland and Austria-Hungary for the Mutual Surrender of Fugitive Criminals of 3 December 1873
- 1928 – Exchange of Notes between the Government of the United Kingdom of Great Britain and Northern Ireland (and on behalf of Australia, New Zealand and South Africa) and the Government of the Republic of Austria extending to Certain Mandated Territories the Treaty for the Mutual Surrender of Fugitive Criminals of 3 December 1873, as amended
- 1935 – Convention between the United Kingdom and Austria supplementary to the Treaty for the Mutual Surrender of Fugitive Criminals of 3 December 1873
- 1975 – Treaty between Australia and the Republic of Austria concerning Extradition
- 1987 – Protocol between Australia and the Republic of Austria amending the Treaty concerning Extradition of 29 March 1973
- 1990 – Treaty between Australia and the Republic of Austria on Mutual Assistance in Criminal Matters

=== Belgium ===
- 1876 – Treaty between the United Kingdom of Great Britain and Ireland and Belgium for the Mutual Surrender of Fugitive Criminals (Brussels, 20 May 1876)
- 1876 – Declaration between the United Kingdom of Great Britain and Ireland and Belgium amending Article I of the Treaty for the Mutual Surrender of Fugitive Criminals of 20 May 1876 (London, 21 April 1887)
- 1877 – Declaration between the United Kingdom of Great Britain and Ireland and Belgium extending to Certain Additional Crimes the Treaty for the Mutual Surrender of Fugitive Criminals of 20 May 1876 (London, 23 July 1877)
- 1902 – Treaty between the United Kingdom of Great Britain and Ireland and Belgium for the Mutual Surrender of Fugitive Criminals
- 1907 – Convention between the United Kingdom of Great Britain and Ireland and Belgium supplementing Article XIV of the Treaty for the Mutual Surrender of Fugitive Criminals
- 1911 – Convention between the United Kingdom of Great Britain and Ireland and Belgium amending Article VI of the Treaty for the Mutual Surrender of Fugitive Criminals of 29 October 1901
- 1928 – Exchange of Notes between the Government of the United Kingdom of Great Britain and Northern Ireland (and on behalf of Australia, New Zealand and South Africa) and the Government of Belgium extending to Certain Mandated Territories the Convention for the Mutual Surrender of Fugitive Criminals of 29 October 1901, as amended
- 1986 – Treaty on Extradition between Australia and the Kingdom of Belgium

=== Bolivia ===
- 1892 – Treaty between the United Kingdom of Great Britain and Ireland and the Republic of Bolivia for the Mutual Surrender of Fugitive Criminals (Lima, 22 February 1892)
- 1928 – Exchange of Notes between the Government of the United Kingdom of Great Britain and Northern Ireland (and on behalf of Australia, New Zealand and South Africa) and the Government of Bolivia extending to Certain Mandated Territories the Treaty for the Mutual Surrender of Fugitive Criminals of 22 February 1892

=== Brazil ===
- 1872 – Treaty between the United Kingdom of Great Britain and Ireland and Brazil for the Mutual Surrender of Fugitive Criminals, and Protocol (Rio de Janeiro, 13 November 1872)
- 1996 – Treaty on Extradition between Australia and the Federative Republic of Brazil

=== Canada ===
- 1990 – Treaty between the Government of Australia and the Government of Canada on Mutual Assistance in Criminal Matters

=== Chile ===
- 1897 – Treaty between the United Kingdom of Great Britain and Ireland and Chile for the Mutual Surrender of Fugitive Criminals (Santiago, 26 January 1897)
- 1928 – Exchange of Notes between the Government of the United Kingdom of Great Britain and Northern Ireland (and on behalf of Australia, New Zealand and South Africa) and the Government of Chile extending to Certain Mandated Territories the Treaty for the Mutual Surrender of Fugitive Criminals of 26 January 1897
- 1996 – Treaty on Extradition between Australia and the Republic of Chile

=== Colombia ===
- 1888 – Treaty between the United Kingdom of Great Britain and Ireland and Colombia for the Mutual Surrender of Fugitive Criminals (Bogota, 27 October 1888)
- 1930 – Convention between the United Kingdom of Great Britain and Northern Ireland [and on behalf of Australia, New Zealand and South Africa] and the Republic of Colombia, supplementary to the Treaty for the Mutual Surrender of Fugitive Criminals of 27 October 1888

=== Congo ===
- 1924 – Convention between the United Kingdom of Great Britain and Northern Ireland, and Belgium, extending to the Belgian Congo and certain British Protectorates the Convention [Treaty] for the Mutual Surrender of Fugitive Criminals

=== Cuba ===
- 1905 – Treaty between the United Kingdom of Great Britain and Ireland and Cuba for the Mutual Surrender of Fugitive Criminals
- 1931 – Convention between the United Kingdom of Great Britain and Northern Ireland [and on behalf of Australia, New Zealand and South Africa] and the Cuban Republic for the Extension to Certain Protectorates and Mandated Territories of the Treaty for the Mutual Surrender of Fugitive Criminals of 3 October 1904

=== Czechoslovakia ===
- 1927 – Treaty between the United Kingdom of Great Britain and Ireland and Czechoslovakia for the Extradition of Criminals
- 1927 – Protocol amending Article 12 of the Treaty for the Extradition of Criminals between the United Kingdom of Great Britain and Ireland and Czechoslovakia of 11 November 1924

=== Denmark ===
- 1873 – Treaty between the United Kingdom of Great Britain and Ireland and Denmark for the Mutual Surrender of Fugitive Criminals (Copenhagen, 31 March 1873)
- 1928 – Exchange of Notes between the Government of the United Kingdom of Great Britain and Northern Ireland (and on behalf of Australia, New Zealand and South Africa) and the Government of Denmark extending to Certain Mandated Territories the Treaty for the Mutual Surrender of Fugitive Criminals of 31 March 1873
- 1936 – Convention [between United Kingdom and Denmark] supplementary to the Treaty for the Mutual Surrender of Fugitive Criminals of 31 March 1873

=== Ecuador ===
- 1880 – Treaty between the United Kingdom of Great Britain and Ireland and the Republic of the Equator [Ecuador] for the Mutual Surrender of Fugitive Criminals (Quito, 20 September 1880)
- 1928 – Exchange of Notes between the Government of the United Kingdom of Great Britain and Northern Ireland (and on behalf of Australia, New Zealand and South Africa) and the Government of Ecuador extending to Certain Mandated Territories the Treaty for the Mutual Surrender of Fugitive Criminals of 20 September 1880
- 1937 – Supplementary Convention between Australia, New Zealand, South Africa and the United Kingdom, and Ecuador, to the Treaty for the Mutual Surrender of Fugitive Criminals of 20 September 1880
- 1997 – Treaty between the Government of Australia and the Government of the Republic of Ecuador on Mutual Assistance in Criminal Matters
- 1990 – Treaty on Extradition between the Government of Australia and the Government of the Republic of Ecuador

=== El Salvador ===
- 1881 – Treaty between the United Kingdom of Great Britain and Ireland and El Salvador for the Mutual Surrender of Fugitive Criminals (Paris, 23 June 1881)
- 1930 – Exchange of Notes between the Government of United Kingdom of Great Britain and Northern Ireland [and on behalf of the Government of Australia, New Zealand and South Africa] and the Government of Republic of Salvador extending to certain Mandated Territories the Treaty for the Mutual Surrender of Fugitive Criminals of 23 June 1881

=== Estonia ===
- 1927 – Extradition Convention between the United Kingdom of Great Britain, Ireland and Estonia.
- 1927 – Exchange of Notes between the Government of the United Kingdom of Great Britain and Ireland (and on behalf of Australia, New Zealand and South Africa) and the Government of Estonia extending to Certain Mandated Territories the Extradition Convention of 18 November 1925

=== Finland ===
- 1925 – Treaty between the United Kingdom of Great Britain and Ireland, and Finland, for the Extradition of Criminals
- 1985 – Treaty between Australia and Finland concerning Extradition
- 1987 – Protocol between Australia and Finland amending the Treaty concerning Extradition of 7 June 1984
- 1994 – Agreement between Australia and Finland on Mutual Assistance in Criminal Matters

=== France ===
- 1876 – Treaty between the United Kingdom of Great Britain and Ireland and France for the Mutual Surrender of Fugitive Criminals (Paris, 14 August 1876)
- 1889 – Arrangement between the Government of the United Kingdom of Great Britain and Ireland and the Government of France extending to Tunis the Provisions of the Treaty for the Mutual Surrender of Fugitive Criminals of 14 August 1876 (Paris, 31 December 1889)
- 1896 – Convention between the United Kingdom of Great Britain and Ireland and France amending Articles VII and IX of the Treaty for the Mutual Surrender of Fugitive Criminals of 14 August 1876 (Paris, 13 February 1896)
- 1989 – Treaty on Extradition between the Government of Australia and the Government of the Republic of France
- 1909 – Convention between the United Kingdom of Great Britain and Ireland and France modifying Article II of the Treaty for the Mutual Surrender of Fugitive Criminals of 14 August 1876
- 1909 – Agreement between the United Kingdom of Great Britain and Ireland and France applying to Tunis the Convention of 17 October 1908 modifying Article II of the Treaty for the Mutual Surrender of Fugitive Criminals of 14 August 1876
- 1994 – Treaty between the Government of Australia and the Government of the French Republic on Mutual Assistance in Criminal Matters

=== Germany ===
- 1872 – Treaty between the United Kingdom of Great Britain and Ireland and Germany for the Mutual Surrender of Fugitive Criminals (London, 14 May 1872)
- 1911 – Treaty between the United Kingdom of Great Britain and Ireland and Germany respecting Extradition between British and German Protectorates
- 1912 – Treaty between the United Kingdom of Great Britain and Ireland and Germany extending to certain British Protectorates the Treaty for the Mutual Surrender of Fugitive Criminals of 14 May 1872
- 1930 – Exchange of Notes constituting an Agreement between the Government of the United Kingdom of Great Britain and Northern Ireland [and on behalf of the Governments of Australia, New Zealand and South Africa] and the Government of Germany extending to certain Mandated Territories the Treaty for the Mutual Surrender of Fugitive Criminals of 14 May 1872
- 1990 – Treaty between Australia and the Federal Republic of Germany concerning Extradition

=== Greece ===
- 1912 – Treaty [between the United Kingdom of Great Britain and Ireland and the Kingdom of Greece] for the Mutual Surrender of Fugitive Criminals
- 1928 – Exchange of Notes between the Government of the United Kingdom of Great Britain and Northern Ireland (and on behalf of Australia, New Zealand and South Africa) and the Government of Greece extending to Certain Mandated Territories the Treaty for the Mutual Surrender of Fugitive Criminals of 24 September 1910
- 1991 – Treaty on Extradition between Australia and the Hellenic Republic

=== Guatemala ===
- 1885 – Treaty between the United Kingdom of Great Britain and Ireland and Guatemala for the Mutual Surrender of Fugitive Criminals (Guatemala, 4 July 1885)
- 1914 – Additional Protocol [amending Article 10 of] the Treaty for the Mutual Surrender of Fugitive Criminals between the United Kingdom of Great Britain and Ireland and Guatemala of 4 July 1885
- 1929 – Exchange of Notes between the Government of the United Kingdom of Great Britain and Northern Ireland [and on behalf of Australia, New Zealand and South Africa] and the Government of Guatemala extending to Certain Mandated Territories the Treaty for the Mutual Surrender of Fugitive Criminals of 4 July 1885, as amended

=== Haiti ===
- 1874 – Treaty between the United Kingdom of Great Britain and Ireland and Haiti for the Mutual Surrender of Fugitive Criminals (Port-au-Prince, 7 December 1874)
- 1928 – Exchange of Notes between the Government of the United Kingdom of Great Britain and Northern Ireland (and on behalf of Australia, New Zealand and South Africa) and the Government of Haiti extending to Certain Mandated Territories the Treaty for the Mutual Surrender of Fugitive Criminals of 7 December 1874

=== Hong Kong ===
- 1997 - Agreement for the Surrender of Accused and Convicted Persons between the Government of Australia and the Government of Hong Kong
- 1999 – Agreement between the Government of Australia and the Government of Hong Kong concerning Mutual Legal Assistance in Criminal Matters -
- 2008 - Protocol Between the Government of Australia and the Government of the Hong Kong Special Administrative Region of the People's Republic of China Amending the Agreement for the Surrender of Accused and Convicted Persons (Hong Kong, 19 March 2007)

=== Hungary ===
- 1873 – Treaty between the United Kingdom of Great Britain and Ireland and Austria-Hungary for the Mutual Surrender of Fugitive Criminals of 3 December 1873
- 1873 – Declaration amending Article XI of the Treaty between the United Kingdom of Great Britain and Ireland and Austria-Hungary for the Mutual Surrender of Fugitive Criminals of 3 December 1873
- 1902 – Declaration amending Article XI of the Treaty between the United Kingdom of Great Britain and Ireland and Austria-Hungary for the Mutual Surrender of Fugitive Criminals of 3 December 1873
- 1928 – Exchange of Notes between the Government of the United Kingdom of Great Britain and Northern Ireland (and on behalf of Australia, New Zealand and South Africa) and the Government of Hungary extending to Certain Mandated Territories the Treaty for the Mutual Surrender of Fugitive Criminals of 3 December 1873, as amended
- 1938 – Treaty between the United Kingdom and Hungary supplementary to the Treaty for the Mutual Surrender of Fugitive Criminals of 3 December 1873
- 1997 – Treaty between Australia and the Republic of Hungary on Mutual Assistance in Criminal Matters
- 1997 – Treaty on Extradition between Australia and the Republic of Hungary Mandated Territories the Treaty for the Mutual Surrender of Fugitive Criminals of 3 December 1873, as amended

=== Iceland ===
- 1939 – Supplementary Convention between the United Kingdom of Great Britain and Northern Ireland and Iceland amending the Extradition Treaty (between United Kingdom and Denmark) of 31 March 1873

=== Indonesia ===
- 1995 – Extradition Treaty between Australia and the Republic of Indonesia
- 1999 – Treaty between Australia and the Republic of Indonesia on Mutual Assistance in Criminal Matters -

=== Iraq ===
- 1934 – Extradition Treaty between the United Kingdom and Iraq

=== Israel ===
- 1976 – Treaty between Australia and the State of Israel concerning Extradition
- 1983 – Exchange of Notes constituting an Agreement between the Government of Australia and the Government of Israel regarding the Taking of Evidence in One Country for use in Criminal Proceedings in the Other Country
- 1995 – Treaty between the Government of Australia and the Government of the State of Israel on Mutual Legal Assistance in Criminal Matters

=== Ireland ===
- 1989 – Treaty on Extradition between Australia and Ireland

=== Italy ===
- 1873 – Treaty between the United Kingdom of Great Britain and Ireland and Italy for the Mutual Surrender of Fugitive Criminals (Rome, 5 February 1873)
- 1976 – Treaty of Extradition between Australia and the Republic of Italy
- 1990 – Treaty of Extradition between Australia and the Republic of Italy
- 1994 – Treaty on Mutual Assistance in Criminal Matters between Australia and the Republic of Italy

=== Latvia ===
- 1926 – Treaty between the United Kingdom of Great Britain and Ireland, and Latvia, for the Extradition of Fugitive Criminals
- 1926 – Exchange of Notes between the Government of the United Kingdom of Great Britain and Ireland (and on behalf of Australia, New Zealand and South Africa) and the Government of Latvia extending to Certain Mandated Territories the Treaty for the Extradition of Fugitive Criminals of 16 July 1924

=== Liberia ===
- 1892 – Treaty between the United Kingdom of Great Britain and Ireland and Liberia for the Mutual Surrender of Fugitive Criminals (London, 16 December 1892)
- 1928 – Exchange of Notes between the Government of the United Kingdom of Great Britain and Northern Ireland (and on behalf of Australia, New Zealand and South Africa) and the Government of Liberia extending to Certain Mandated Territories the Treaty for the Mutual Surrender of Fugitive Criminals of 16 December 1892

=== Lithuania ===
- 1928 – Extradition Treaty between the United Kingdom of Great Britain and Ireland and the Republic of Lithuania
- 1928 – Exchange of Notes between the Government of the United Kingdom of Great Britain and Northern Ireland (and on behalf of Australia, New Zealand and South Africa) and the Government of Lithuania extending to Certain Mandated Territories the provisions of the Extradition Treaty of 18 May 1926

=== Luxembourg ===
- 1880 – Treaty between the United Kingdom of Great Britain and Ireland and Luxembourg for the Mutual Surrender of Fugitive Criminals (Luxemburg, 24 November 1880)
- 1928 – Exchange of Notes between the Government of the United Kingdom of Great Britain and Northern Ireland (and on behalf of Australia, New Zealand and South Africa) and the Government of Luxemburg extending to Certain Mandated Territories the Treaty for the Mutual Surrender of Fugitive Criminals of 24 November 1880
- 1938 – Convention between Australia, New Zealand and the United Kingdom of Great Britain and Northern Ireland, and the Grand Duchy of Luxembourg, supplementary to the Treaty for the Mutual Surrender of Fugitive Criminals of 24 November 1880
- 1950 – Convention between the United Kingdom and Luxembourg amending the Treaty for the Mutual Surrender of Fugitive Criminals of 24 November 1880
- 1988 – Treaty on Extradition between Australia and the Grand Duchy of Luxembourg
- 1994 – Treaty between Australia and the Grand Duchy of Luxembourg on Mutual Assistance in Criminal Matters

=== Mexico ===
- 1886 – Treaty between the United Kingdom of Great Britain and Ireland and Mexico for the Mutual Surrender of Fugitive Criminals (Mexico, 7 September 1886)
- 1991 – Treaty on Extradition between Australia and the United Mexican States
- 1992 – Treaty between Australia and the United Mexican States on Mutual Legal Assistance in Criminal Matters

=== Monaco ===
- 1891 – Treaty between the United Kingdom of Great Britain and Ireland and Monaco for the Extradition of Criminals (Paris, 17 December 1891)
- 1931 – Convention between the United Kingdom of Great Britain and Northern Ireland, Australia, New Zealand and South Africa, and Monaco, for the Extension to Certain Protectorates and Mandated Territories of the Treaty for the Extradition of Criminals of 17 December 1891 (Paris, 27 November 1930)
- 1990 – Treaty on Extradition between the Government of Australia and the Government of His Serene Highness the Prince of Monaco

=== Netherlands ===
- 1898 – Treaty between the United Kingdom of Great Britain and Ireland and the Netherlands for the Mutual Surrender of Fugitive Criminals (London, 26 September 1898)
- 1928 – Exchange of Notes between the Government of the United Kingdom of Great Britain and Northern Ireland (and on behalf of Australia, New Zealand and South Africa) and the Government of the Netherlands extending to Certain Mandated Territories the Treaty for the Mutual Surrender of Fugitive Criminals of 26 September 1898
- 1988 – Treaty on Extradition between Australia and the Kingdom of the Netherlands
- 1991 – Treaty between Australia and the Kingdom of the Netherlands on Mutual Assistance in Criminal Matters

=== Nicaragua ===
- 1906 – Treaty between the United Kingdom of Great Britain and Ireland and Nicaragua for the Mutual Surrender of Fugitive Criminals
- 1928 – Exchange of Notes between the Government of the United Kingdom of Great Britain and Northern Ireland (and on behalf of Australia, New Zealand and South Africa) and the Government of Nicaragua extending to Certain Mandated Territories the Treaty for the Mutual Extradition of Fugitive Criminals of 19 April 1905

=== Norway ===
- 1873 – Treaty between the United Kingdom of Great Britain and Ireland, and Sweden and Norway, for the Mutual Surrender of Fugitive Criminals (Stockholm, 26 June 1873)
- 1929 – Supplementary Agreement between the United Kingdom and Norway to the Treaty for the Mutual Surrender of Fugitive Criminals of 26 June 1873
- 1929 – Exchange of Notes between the Government of the United Kingdom of Great Britain and Northern Ireland [and on behalf of Australia, New Zealand and South Africa] and the Government of Norway extending to Certain Mandated Territories the Treaty for the Mutual Surrender of Fugitive Criminals of 26 June 1873, as amended
- 1987 – Treaty between Australia and Norway concerning Extradition

=== Panama ===
- 1907 – Treaty between the United Kingdom of Great Britain and Ireland and Panama for the Mutual Surrender of Fugitive Criminals
- 1928 – Exchange of Notes between the Government of the United Kingdom of Great Britain and Northern Ireland (and on behalf of Australia, New Zealand and South Africa) and the Government of Panama extending to Certain Mandated Territories the Treaty for the Mutual Surrender of Fugitive Criminals of 25 August 1906

=== Paraguay ===
- 1911 – Treaty between the United Kingdom of Great Britain and Ireland and Paraguay for the Mutual Surrender of Fugitive Criminals
- 1928 – Exchange of Notes between the Government of the United Kingdom of Great Britain and Northern Ireland (and on behalf of Australia, New Zealand and South Africa) and the Government of Paraguay extending to Certain Mandad Territories the Treaty for the Mutual Surrender of Fugitive Criminals of 12 September 1908
- 1942 – Supplementary Convention between His Majesty in respect of the United Kingdom, the Commonwealth of Australia, New Zealand and the Union of South Africa and the President of Paraguay to the Treaty for the Mutual Surrender of Fugitive Criminals of 12 September 1908
- 1999 – Treaty on Extradition between Australia and the Republic of Paraguay -

=== Peru ===
- 1907 – Treaty between the United Kingdom of Great Britain and Ireland and Peru for the Mutual Surrender of Fugitive Criminals
- 1928 – Exchange of Notes between the Government of the United Kingdom of Great Britain and Northern Ireland (and on behalf of Australia, New Zealand and South Africa) and the Government of Peru extending to Certain Mandated Territories the Treaty for the Mutual Surrender of Fugitive Criminals of 26 January 1904

=== Philippines ===
- 1991 – Treaty on Extradition between Australia and the Republic of the Philippines
- 1993 – Treaty between Australia and the Republic of the Philippines on Mutual Assistance in Criminal Matters

=== Poland ===
- 1935 – Treaty between the United Kingdom of Great Britain and Northern Ireland and the Republic of Poland for the Surrender of Fugitive Criminals
- 1999 – Treaty between Australia and the Republic of Poland on Extradition -

=== Portugal ===
- 1892 – Treaty between the United Kingdom of Great Britain and Ireland and Portugal for the Mutual Surrender of Fugitive Criminals (Lisbon, 17 October 1892)
- 1933 – Convention between the United Kingdom of Great Britain and Northern Ireland, Australia, New Zealand, South Africa and India, and the Portuese Republic, Supplementary to the Treaty for the Mutual Surrender of Fugitive Criminals of 17 October 1892, and Exchange of Notes
- 1934 – Exchange of Notes between the United Kingdom (and on behalf of Australia and New Zealand) and Portugal extending to certain Mandated Territories the Treaty for the Mutual Surrender of Fugitive Criminals of 17 October 1892
- 1988 – Treaty on Extradition between Australia and the Republic of Portugal
- 1994 – Treaty between Australia and the Republic of Portugal on Mutual Assistance in Criminal Matters

=== Romania ===
- 1893 – Treaty between the United Kingdom of Great Britain and Ireland and Roumania for the Mutual Surrender of Fugitive Criminals (Bucharest, 21 March 1893)
- 1894 – Protocol between the United Kingdom of Great Britain and Ireland and Roumania explanatory of Article II.21 of the Treaty for the Mutual Surrender of Fugitive Criminals of 21 March 1893 (Bucharest, 13 March 1894)
- 1929 – Exchange of Notes constituting an Agreement between the Government of the United Kingdom of Great Britain and Northern Ireland [and on behalf of Australia, New Zealand and South Africa] and the Government of Roumania extending to Certain Mandated Territories the Treaty for the Mutual Surrender of Fugitive Criminals of 21 March 1893, as amended

=== San Marino ===
- 1899 – Treaty between the United Kingdom of Great Britain and Ireland and San Marino for the Mutual Extradition of Fugitive Criminals (Florence, 16 October 1899)
- 1934 – Exchange of Notes between United Kingdom (and on behalf of Australia, New Zealand and South Africa) and San Marino extending to certain Mandated Territories of the Treaty for the Mutual Extradition of Fugitive Criminals

=== South Korea ===
- 1991 – Treaty on Extradition between Australia and the Republic of Korea
- 1993 – Treaty between Australia and the Republic of Korea on Mutual Assistance in Criminal Matters

=== Spain ===
- 1878 – Treaty between the United Kingdom of Great Britain and Ireland and Spain for the Mutual Surrender of Fugitive Criminals (London, 4 June 1878)
- 1889 – Declaration between the United Kingdom of Great Britain and Ireland and Spain amending Articles 2.5 and 6 of the Treaty for the Mutual Surrender of Fugitive Criminals of 4 June 1878 (Madrid, 19 February 1889)
- 1928 – Exchange of Notes between the Government of the United Kingdom of Great Britain and Northern Ireland (and on behalf of Australia, New Zealand and South Africa) and the Government of Spain extending to Certain Mandated Territories the Treaty for the Mutual Surrender of Fugitive Criminals of 4 June 1878, as amended
- 1988 – Treaty on Extradition between Australia and Spain
- 1991 – Treaty on Mutual Assistance in Criminal Matters between Australia and the Kingdom of Spain

=== Sweden ===
- 1873 – Treaty between the United Kingdom of Great Britain and Ireland, and Sweden and Norway, for the Mutual Surrender of Fugitive Criminals (Stockholm, 26 June 1873)
- 1907 – Supplementary Agreement between the United Kingdom of Great Britain and Ireland and Sweden to the Treaty for the Mutual Surrender of Fugitive Criminals of 26 June 1873
- 1974 – Treaty between Australia and Sweden concerning Extradition
- 1985 – Protocol between Australia and Sweden amending the Treaty concerning Extradition of 20 March 1973
- 1989 – Protocol between Australia and Sweden further amending the Treaty concerning Extradition of 20 March 1973

=== Switzerland ===
- 1880 – Treaty between the United Kingdom of Great Britain and Ireland and Switzerland for the Mutual Surrender of Fugitive Criminals (Berne, 26 November 1880)
- 1905 – Convention between the United Kingdom of Great Britain and Ireland and Switzerland supplementing Article XVIII of the Treaty for the Mutual Surrender of Fugitive Criminals of 26 November 1880
- 1929 – Exchange of Notes between the Government of the United Kingdom of Great Britain and Northern Ireland [and on behalf of Australia, New Zealand and South Africa] and the Government of Switzerland extending to Certain Mandated Territories the Treaty for the Mutual Surrender of Fugitive Criminals of 26 November 1880, as amended
- 1936 – Convention between the United Kingdom and Switzerland Supplementary to the Treaty for the Mutual Surrender of Fugitive Criminals of 26 November 1880
- 1991 – Treaty between Australia and Switzerland on Extradition
- 1994 – Treaty between Australia and Switzerland on Mutual Assistance in Criminal Matters

=== Thailand ===
- 1911 – Treaty between the United Kingdom of Great Britain and Ireland and Siam (Thailand) respecting the Extradition of Fugitive Criminals
- 1928 – Exchange of Notes between the Government of the United Kingdom of Great Britain and Northern Ireland (and on behalf of Australia, New Zealand and South Africa) and the Government of Siam extending to Certain Mandated Territories the Treaty for the Mutual Surrender of Fugitive Criminals of 4 March 1911

=== Uruguay ===
- 1884 – Treaty between the United Kingdom of Great Britain and Ireland and Uruguay for the Mutual Surrender of Fugitive Criminals (Montevideo, 26 March 1884)
- 1891 – Protocol between the United Kingdom of Great Britain and Ireland and Uruguay to amend Article IX of the Treaty for the Mutual Surrender of Fugitive Criminals of 26 March 1884 (Montevideo, 20 March 1891)

=== United States ===
- 1842 – Treaty between the United Kingdom of Great Britain and Ireland and the United States of America to Settle and Define the Boundaries between the Possessions of Her Britannic Majesty in North America and the Territories of the United States; for the Final Suppression of the African Slave Trade; and for the Giving up of Criminal Fugitives from Justice in certain cases [Webster-Ashburton Treaty] (Washington, 9 August 1842)
- 1889 – Supplementary Convention [to the Treaty of 9 August 1842] for the Extradition of Criminals (Washington, 12 July 1889)
- 1900 – Supplementary Convention between the United Kingdom of Great Britain and Ireland and the United States of America to the Convention for the Mutual Extradition of Criminals of 12 July 1889 (Washington, 13 December 1900)
- 1907 – Supplementary Convention between the United Kingdom of Great Britain and Ireland and the United States of America to the Convention for the Mutual Extradition of Fugitive Criminals of 12 July 1889, as supplemented
- 1935 – Extradition Treaty between the United Kingdom of Great Britain and Northern Ireland and the United States of America
- 1976 – Treaty on Extradition between Australia and the United States of America
- 1992 – Protocol amending the Treaty on Extradition between Australia and the United States of America of 14 May 1974
- 1999 – Treaty between the Government of Australia and the Government of the United States of America on Mutual Assistance in Criminal Matters, and Exchange of Notes

=== Venezuela ===
- 1993 – Treaty on Extradition between Australia and the Republic of Venezuela

=== Vietnam ===
- 2009 - Agreement Between Australia and the Socialist Republic of Vietnam concerning Transfer of Sentenced Persons (Canberra, 13 October 2008)

=== Yugoslavia ===
- 1900 – Treaty between the United Kingdom of Great Britain and Ireland and Serbia (Yugoslavia) for the Mutual Extradition of Fugitive Criminals (Belgrade, 6 December 1900)
- 1928 – Exchange of Notes between the Government of the United Kingdom of Great Britain and Northern Ireland (and on behalf of Australia, New Zealand and South Africa) and the Government of the Serb-Croat-Slovene State [Yugoslavia] extending to Certain Mandated Territories the Treaty for the Mutual Extradition of Fugitive Criminals of 6 December 1900
