= Australia–France bilateral treaties =

International treaties

The following is a list of international bilateral treaties between Australia and France

- Early treaties were extended to Australia by the British Empire, however they are still generally in force.
- European Union treaties, extended to France are not included below.

Entry into force	Topic	Title	Ref
1854	Extradition	Agreement between the Government of the United Kingdom of Great Britain and Ireland and the Government of France relative to Merchant Seamen Deserters (London, 23 June 1854)	
1876	Extradition	Treaty between the United Kingdom of Great Britain and Ireland and France for the Mutual Surrender of Fugitive Criminals (Paris, 14 August 1876)	
1879	Other	Agreement between the Government of the United Kingdom of Great Britain and Ireland and the Government of France for the Mutual Relief of Distressed Seamen (London, 5 November 1879)	
1889	Extradition	Arrangement between the Government of the United Kingdom of Great Britain and Ireland and the Government of France extending to Tunis the Provisions of the Treaty for the Mutual Surrender of Fugitive Criminals of 14 August 1876 (Paris, 31 December 1889)	
1889	Other	Declaration between the United Kingdom of Great Britain and Ireland and France respecting the Disposal of the Proceeds of Wrecks on their respective Coasts (Paris, 23 October 1889)	
1896	Extradition	Convention between the United Kingdom of Great Britain and Ireland and France amending Articles VII and IX of the Treaty for the Mutual Surrender of Fugitive Criminals of 14 August 1876 (Paris, 13 February 1896)	
1902	Postal	Agreement [amending Article 4] between the United Kingdom of Great Britain and Ireland and France Additional to the Convention respecting Postal Communications of 30 August 1890	
1909	Extradition	Agreement between the United Kingdom of Great Britain and Ireland and France applying to Tunis the Convention of 17 October 1908 modifying Article II of the Treaty for the Mutual Surrender of Fugitive Criminals of 14 August 1876	
1909	Extradition	Convention between the United Kingdom of Great Britain and Ireland and France modifying Article II of the Treaty for the Mutual Surrender of Fugitive Criminals of 14 August 1876	
1918	War/Peace	Agreement between the United Kingdom of Great Britain and Ireland and France respecting British War Graves in France	
1920	War/Peace	Exchange of Notes constituting an Agreement between the Government of the United Kingdom of Great Britain and Ireland and the Government of the Republic of France respecting the Restoration of Property and Payment of Debts due by Enemy Businesses in Liquidation	
1928	Civil law	Convention between the United Kingdom and France respecting Legal Proceedings in Civil and Commercial Matters	
1937	Trade	Exchange of Notes between the Government of the Commonwealth of Australia and the Government of the French Republic constituting a Commercial Agreement	
1938	War/Peace	Convention between the Governments of Australia, Canada, New Zealand and the United Kingdom of Great Britain and Northern Ireland, and the Government of the French Republic, concerning the Transfer to the French State of the Property in the Sites of British Monuments commemorative of the War 1914-1918	
1938	War/Peace	Convention between the United Kingdom and France for the Abolition of Capitulations in Morocco and Zanzibar, Protocol of Signature	
1938	Antarctic	Exchange of Notes constituting an Agreement between the Governments of Australia, New Zealand and the United Kingdom of the Great Britain and Northern Ireland, and the Government of the French Republic, regarding Aerial Navigation in the Antarctic (Paris, 25 October 1938)	
1947	War/Peace	Exchange of Notes constituting an Agreement between the Government of Australia and the Government of the Republic of France relating to Money and Property situated in France and Australia which have been subjected to Special Measures in consequence of the Enemy Occupation of France	
1951	War/Peace	Exchange of Notes constituting an Agreement between the Government of Australia and the Government of France concerning War Damage Compensation	
1955	Other	Exchange of Notes constituting an Agreement between the Government of the Commonwealth of Australia and the Government of the French Republic regarding the Exchange of Official Publications	
1959	Civil law	Convention between United Kingdom and France supplementary to the Convention respecting Legal Proceedings in Civil and Commercial Matters of 2 February 1922, and Procedures-Verbal	
1965	Trade	Agreement between the Government of the Commonwealth of Australia and the Government of the French Republic relating to Air Transport	
1967	Science	Exchange of Notes constituting an Agreement between the Government of the Commonwealth of Australia and the Government of the French Republic concerning the Conduct of Balloon Launchings in Australia for Scientific and Meteorological Studies	
1970	Taxation	Agreement between the Government of the Commonwealth of Australia and the Government of the French Republic for the Avoidance of Double Taxation of Income derived from International Air Transport	
1977	Taxation	Agreement between the Government of Australia and the Government of the French Republic for the Avoidance of Double Taxation and the Prevention of Fiscal Evasion with respect to Taxes on Income	
1978	Other	Cultural Agreement between the Government of Australia and the Government of the French Republic	
1980	Nuclear energy	Exchange of Letters between the Government of Australia and the Government of the French Republic constituting a Transitional Agreement to enable Conversion and/or Enrichment in France of Australian Origin Nuclear Material supplied to Japan	
1981	Nuclear energy	Agreement between the Government of Australia and the Government of the French Republic concerning Nuclear Transfers between Australia and France, and Exchange of Letters	
1983	Education	Agreement between the Government of Australia and the Government of the French Republic concerning the Establishment of a French - Australian School in Canberra	
1985	Defence	Agreement between the Government of Australia and the Government of the French Republic relating to the Exchange and Communication of Classified Information	
1989	Science	Scientific and Technological Agreement between the Government of Australia and the Government of the French Republic	
1989	Extradition	Treaty on Extradition between the Government of Australia and the Government of the Republic of France	
1990	Defence	Agreement between the Government of Australia and the Government of the Republic of France concerning Collaboration on Defence Research and Technology	
1990	Taxation	Protocol amending the Agreement between the Government of Australia and the Government of the French Republic for the Avoidance of Double Taxation and the Prevention of Fiscal Evasion with respect to Taxes on Income of 13 April 1976	
1994	Other	Agreement between the Government of Australia and the Government of the French Republic on a Programme involving the Establishment and Use of the "DORIS" Precise Satellite Location Beacon System in Australia	
1994	Criminal law	Treaty between the Government of Australia and the Government of the French Republic on Mutual Assistance in Criminal Matters	
1999	Visas	Exchange of Letters constituting an Agreement between the Government of Australia and the Government of the Republic of France relating to the Movement of Nationals between the Two Countries	
2004	Consular	Agreement between the Government of Australia and the Government of the Republic of France on employment of Dependants of Agents of Official Missions of One of the Two States in the Other State (Adelaide, 2 November 2001)	
2005	Antarctic	Treaty Between the Government of Australia and the Government of the French Republic on Cooperation in the Maritime Areas Adjacent to the French Southern and Antarctic Territories (TAAF), Heard Island and the McDonald Islands (Canberra, 24 November 2003)	
2009	Defence	Agreement Between the Government of Australia and the Government of the French Republic regarding Defence Cooperation and Status of Forces (Paris, 14 December 2006)	
2009	Taxation	Convention Between the Government of Australia and the Government of the French Republic for the Avoidance of Double Taxation with respect to Taxes on Income and the Prevention of Fiscal Evasion and Protocol (Paris, 20 June 2006)	
2011	Antarctic	Agreement on Cooperative Enforcement of Fisheries Laws between the Government of Australia and the Government of the French Republic in the Maritime Areas Adjacent to the French Southern and Antarctic Territories, Heard Island and the McDonald Islands (Paris, 8 January 2007)	
2017	Defence	Agreement Between the Government of Australia And the Government of the French Republic Regarding the Exchange and Reciprocal Protection of Classified Information -	
2017	Defence	Framework Agreement Between the Government of Australia And the Government of the French Republic Concerning Cooperation on the Future Submarine Program	
