= Foreign relations of El Salvador =

El Salvador is a member of the United Nations and several of its specialized agencies, the Organization of American States (OAS), the Central American Common Market (CACM), the Central American Parliament (PARLACEN), and the Central American Integration System (SICA). It actively participates in the Central American Security Commission (CASC), which seeks to promote regional arms control.

In November 1950, El Salvador helped the newly empowered 14th Dalai Lama by supporting his Tibetan Government cabinet minister's telegram requesting an appeal before the General Assembly of the United Nations to stop the Communist China's People's Liberation Army's invasion of Tibet.

El Salvador also is a member of the World Trade Organization and is pursuing regional free trade agreements. An active participant in the Summit of the Americas process, El Salvador chairs a working group on market access under the Free Trade Area of the Americas initiative.

El Salvador has joined its six Central American neighbors in signing the Alliance for Sustainable Development, known as the Conjunta Centroamerica-USA or CONCAUSA to promote sustainable economic development in the region.

== Diplomatic relations ==
List of countries which El Salvador maintains diplomatic relations with:

#	Country	Date
1	Honduras	Unknown
2	Colombia	8 March 1825
3	Mexico	12 May 1838
4	Nicaragua	24 July 1840
5	Costa Rica	10 December 1845
6	Guatemala	21 March 1847
7	Peru	10 June 1857
8	Netherlands	1857
9	France	21 October 1859
10	Chile	10 April 1860
11	Italy	9 May 1861
12	United States	15 June 1863
13	Spain	24 June 1865
14	Bolivia	1865
15	Sweden	1 October 1876
16	Argentina	9 April 1880
17	Paraguay	1880
18	Dominican Republic	3 July 1882
19	United Kingdom	1883
—	Venezuela (suspended)	28 February 1884
20	Ecuador	29 March 1890
21	Belgium	1 July 1890
22	Cuba	11 November 1902
23	Brazil	1906
24	Panama	9 March 1909
—	Holy See	12 October 1922
25	Uruguay	11 January 1929
26	Czech Republic	4 March 1930
27	Japan	15 February 1935
28	Norway	27 April 1939
29	Philippines	4 July 1946
30	Denmark	20 October 1947
31	Israel	May 1948
32	Turkey	21 September 1950
—	Sovereign Military Order of Malta	1951
33	Austria	19 February 1952
34	Germany	25 August 1952
35	Switzerland	22 August 1960
36	Canada	29 December 1961
37	South Korea	28 August 1962
38	Egypt	1964
39	Greece	1965
40	Portugal	15 March 1966
41	Finland	14 April 1967
43	Singapore	6 October 1974
43	Pakistan	5 February 1979
44	India	12 February 1979
45	Suriname	1 March 1979
46	Serbia	14 December 1979
47	Romania	17 December 1979
48	Belize	1982
49	Australia	5 December 1983
50	Thailand	24 September 1987
51	Jamaica	30 November 1990
52	Luxembourg	26 April 1991
53	Bulgaria	26 June 1991
54	Hungary	26 September 1991
55	Poland	27 September 1991
56	Guyana	1 May 1992
57	Bahamas	6 May 1992
58	Russia	3 June 1992
59	Saint Vincent and the Grenadines	8 June 1992
60	Saint Kitts and Nevis	15 October 1992
61	Grenada	17 December 1992
62	Antigua and Barbuda	18 May 1993
63	Slovakia	10 March 1994
64	Trinidad and Tobago	11 May 1994
65	Barbados	19 May 1994
66	Saint Lucia	6 June 1995
67	North Macedonia	28 October 1996
68	Morocco	November 1996
69	Croatia	24 June 1997
70	Slovenia	10 November 1997
71	South Africa	11 November 1997
72	Ivory Coast	13 December 1997
73	Andorra	14 May 1998
74	Malaysia	June 1998
75	Armenia	22 March 1999
76	Azerbaijan	23 March 1999
77	Tajikistan	7 April 1999
78	Ukraine	14 April 1999
79	Georgia	17 May 1999
80	Turkmenistan	20 May 1999
81	Bahrain	7 July 1999
82	Mongolia	14 July 1999
83	Lithuania	15 October 1999
84	Belarus	25 October 1999
85	Cyprus	5 November 1999
86	Kuwait	9 December 1999
87	Ireland	13 July 2000
88	Brunei	28 August 2000
89	Iceland	25 October 2000
90	Monaco	14 December 2000
91	Latvia	11 January 2001
92	Estonia	12 February 2001
93	Mauritius	6 September 2001
94	New Zealand	12 November 2001
95	Timor-Leste	23 May 2003
96	Albania	25 July 2003
97	Bosnia and Herzegovina	25 July 2003
98	Qatar	24 September 2003
99	Malta	9 June 2004
100	Algeria	20 December 2006
101	Jordan	10 January 2007
102	San Marino	18 January 2007
103	Tunisia	14 March 2007
104	United Arab Emirates	15 March 2007
105	Lebanon	25 September 2007
106	Oman	14 April 2008
107	Namibia	5 August 2008
108	Saudi Arabia	27 February 2009
109	Cambodia	16 January 2010
110	Vietnam	16 January 2010
111	Indonesia	23 September 2011
112	Tuvalu	8 July 2012
113	Sri Lanka	10 December 2012
—	State of Palestine	9 May 2013
114	Dominica	5 June 2013
115	Solomon Islands	22 July 2013
116	Moldova	24 September 2013
117	Montenegro	27 September 2013
118	Kazakhstan	30 January 2014
—	Kosovo	14 October 2014
119	Mali	23 September 2014
120	Uzbekistan	3 December 2014
121	Fiji	30 January 2015
122	Togo	13 March 2015
123	Kenya	28 September 2015
124	Senegal	29 September 2015
125	Mozambique	29 September 2015
126	Liechtenstein	2015
127	Kyrgyzstan	17 March 2016
128	Nepal	21 September 2016
129	Ethiopia	28 October 2016
130	Bangladesh	7 November 2016
131	Haiti	6 September 2017
132	Maldives	19 September 2017
133	Marshall Islands	22 September 2017
134	Uganda	22 September 2017
135	Samoa	13 April 2018
136	China	21 August 2018
137	Angola	18 September 2023
138	Burundi	18 September 2023
139	Equatorial Guinea	18 September 2023
140	Ghana	18 September 2023
141	Rwanda	18 September 2023
142	Sierra Leone	18 September 2023
143	Benin	18 October 2023
144	Cape Verde	15 February 2024
145	Zimbabwe	16 February 2024
146	Seychelles	12 November 2024
147	Djibouti	6 December 2024
148	Mauritania	10 December 2024
149	Zambia	10 December 2024
150	Gambia	24 February 2026
151	Botswana	25 March 2026
152	Laos	28 July 2026

== Bilateral relations ==
=== Africa ===
Country	Formal Relations Began	Notes
Sahrawi Arab Democratic Republic	31 July 1989	See: El Salvador–Sahrawi Arab Democratic Republic relations: El Salvador recognized the SADR on July 31, 1989. In April 1997, El Salvador cancelled relations with the SADR. In June 2009, and during a visit of SADR's president, Mohamed Abdelaziz, relations were restored. On November 30, 2010, the SADR and El Salvador upgrade their relations to ambassadorial level. El Salvador withdrew recognition on 15 June 2019.

=== Americas ===
Country	Formal Relations Began	Notes
Argentina	1940	See Argentina–El Salvador relations: Argentina has an embassy in San Salvador.; El Salvador has an embassy in Buenos Aires.
Canada	29 December 1961	See Canada–El Salvador relations: Canada has an embassy in San Salvador.; El Salvador has an embassy in Ottawa and consulates-general in Calgary, Montreal, Toronto and Vancouver.
Cuba	11 November 1902	Cuba and El Salvador have resumed diplomatic relations on June 1, 2009. El Salvador previously suspended diplomatic relations with Cuba in 1961 due to the Cuban Revolution.: Cuba has an embassy in San Salvador.; El Salvador has an embassy in Havana.
Mexico	1838	See El Salvador–Mexico relations Diplomatic relations between Mexico and El Salvador were established in 1838.: Mexico has an embassy in San Salvador.; El Salvador has an embassy in Mexico City and consulates-general in Acayucan, Ciudad Juárez , Guadalajara, Monterrey, Oaxaca City, San Luis Potosí, Tapachula, Tijuana and Villahermosa.
Peru	1857	See El Salvador–Peru relations: El Salvador has an embassy in Lima.; Peru has an embassy in San Salvador.
United States	1863	See El Salvador–United States relations U.S. policy towards the country promotes the strengthening of El Salvador's democratic institutions, rule of law, judicial reform, and civilian police; national reconciliation and reconstruction; and economic opportunity and growth. El Salvador has been a committed member of the coalition of nations fighting against terrorism and has sent 10 rotations of troops to support the Iraq War.: El Salvador has an embassy in Washington, D.C., and has several consulates-general scattered about the country.; United States has an embassy in San Salvador.
Uruguay	11 January 1929	See El Salvador–Uruguay relations: El Salvador has an embassy in Montevideo.; Uruguay has an embassy in San Salvador.
Venezuela	28 February 1884	See El Salvador–Venezuela relations In November 2019, El Salvador recognized opposition leader Juan Guaido as the legitimate President of Venezuela, cutting off relations with disputed president Nicolas Maduro's government.: El Salvador has an embassy in Caracas.; Venezuela has an embassy in San Salvador.

=== Asia ===
Country	Formal Relations Began	Notes
China	21 August 2018	See China–El Salvador relations and El Salvador–Taiwan relations On August 21, China's State Councilor and Foreign Minister Wang Yi held talks with El Salvador Foreign Minister Carlos Castaneda and signed a joint communique on the establishment of diplomatic relations, deciding to recognize each other and establish diplomatic relations at an ambassadorial level from the date of the communique's signing. The government of the Republic of China on Taiwan has preemptively severed diplomatic ties with El Salvador.: China has an embassy in San Salvador.; El Salvador has an embassy in Beijing.
India	12 February 1979	See El Salvador–India relations: El Salvador has an embassy in New Delhi; India is accredited to El Salvador from its embassy in Guatemala City, Guatemala.
Jordan	10 January 2007	El Salvador is accredited to Jordan from its embassy in Doha, Qatar.; Jordan is accredited to El Salvador from its embassy in Mexico City.
State of Palestine	9 May 2013	See El Salvador–Palestine relations El Salvador, which is home to a sizable ethnic Palestinian community, was widely expected to join the succession of South American governments that recognised Palestine in the end of 2010. In May 2011, members of the country's Legislative Assembly including its president Sigfrido Reyes presented a proposal to the Cabinet to issue a statement formally recognising the State of Palestine. The Central American Integration System (SICA) was expected to adopt a co-ordinated position on the issue at its summit in San Salvador on 18 August. However, El Salvador, as the nation presiding over the summit, refused to include the matter on the official agenda, insisting that discussion should retain a regional focus. Despite this, the government officially recognised the Palestinian state on 25 August 2011.: El Salvador conducts relations with Palestine from its embassy in Tel Aviv, Israel and maintains an honorary consulate in Bethlehem.; Palestine has an embassy in San Salvador.; See also Palestinian Salvadoran
South Korea	28 August 1962	The establishment of diplomatic relations between the Republic of Korea and the Republic of El Salvador began in August 1962 and the number of the South Koreans living in El Salvador in 2013 was about 258.: South Korea has an embassy in San Salvador.; El Salvador has an embassy in Seoul.
Turkey	Jan. 26, 1934	El Salvador has an embassy in Ankara.; Turkey has an embassy in San Salvador.; Trade volume between the two countries was US$17.1 million in 2019 (Salvadoran exports/imports: 2.3/14.8 million USD).

=== Europe ===
Country	Formal Relations Began	Notes
France	21 October 1859	See El Salvador–France relations: El Salvador has an embassy in Paris.; France has an embassy in San Salvador.
Kosovo	14 October 2014	El Salvador officially recognised Kosovo as an independent sovereign state on 29 June 2013.; El Salvador and Kosovo established official diplomatic relations on 18 October 2014.; Kosovo is accredited to El Salvador from its embassy in Panama City, Panamá.
Spain	24 June 1865	See El Salvador–Spain relations: El Salvador has an embassy in Madrid and consulates-general in Barcelona and Seville.; Spain has an embassy in San Salvador.
United Kingdom	1883	See El Salvador–United Kingdom relations British Ambassodor to El Salvador Bernhard Garside with Salvadoran President Salvador Sánchez Cerén in San Salvador, March 2015. El Salvador established diplomatic relations with the United Kingdom in 1883.: El Salvador maintains an embassy in London.; The United Kingdom is accredited to El Salvador from its embassy in San Salvador.; Both countries share common membership of the International Criminal Court, the World Trade Organization, and the Central America–UK Association Agreement. Bilaterally the two countries have an Investment Agreement.

=== Oceania ===
Country	Formal Relations Began	Notes
Australia	5 December 1983	See Australia–El Salvador relations: Australia is accredited to El Salvador from its embassy in Mexico City, Mexico and maintains an honorary consulate in San Salvador.; El Salvador has an embassy in Canberra and a consulate-general in Melbourne.

== See also ==
- List of diplomatic missions in El Salvador
- List of diplomatic missions of El Salvador
