= El Salvador–Taiwan relations =

- El Salvador: Taiwan

In 2018, El Salvador ended its diplomatic relationship with the Republic of China (governing on Taiwan since 1949). Its former relationship with the ROC dated to 1933, when the ROC governed on mainland China.

== History ==
Diplomatic ties between China and El Salvador were first established in 1933 when the Nationalist government held control of mainland China while Taiwan was part of the Empire of Japan.

In 2018, El Salvador ended its diplomatic relationship with Taiwan. El Salvador recognized the People's Republic of China on 21 August 2018.

== See also ==
- History of foreign relations of China
- Foreign relations of China
- Foreign relations of El Salvador
- China–El Salvador relations
