= List of diplomatic missions in El Salvador =

This is a list of diplomatic missions in El Salvador. There are 32 embassies in San Salvador.

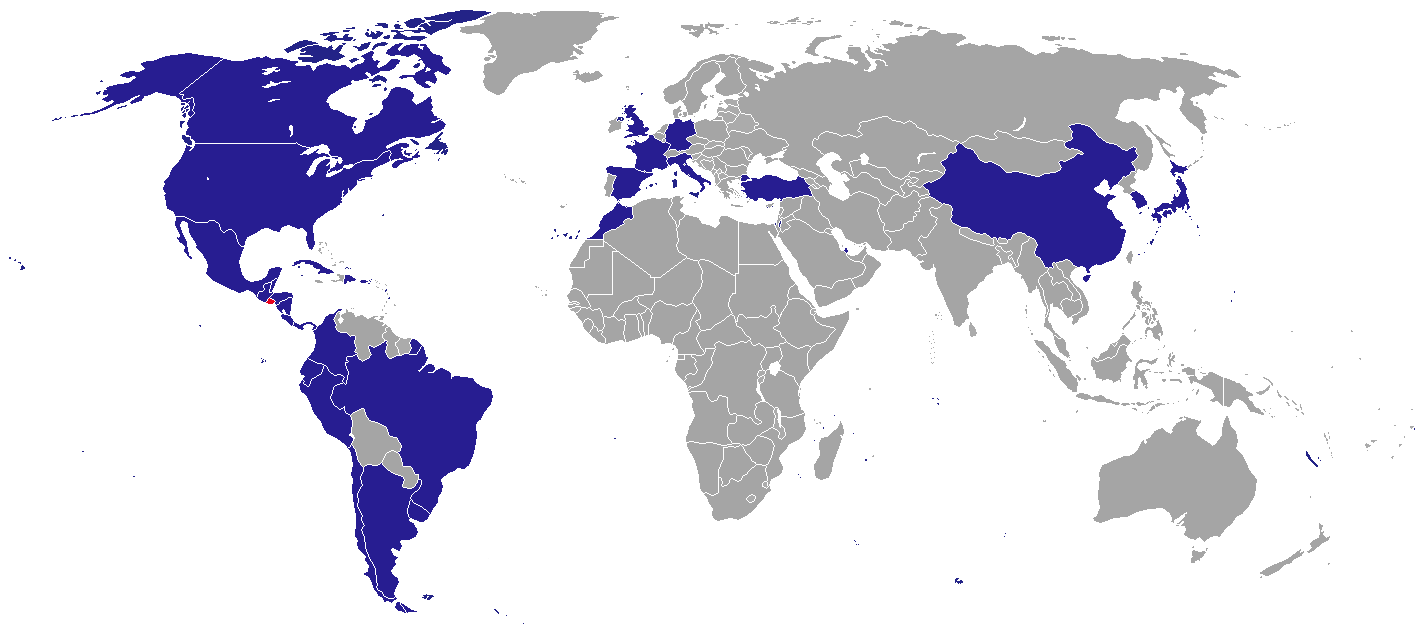
Diplomatic missions in El Salvador

== Diplomatic missions in San Salvador ==
=== Embassies ===
1. Argentina
2. Belize
3. Brazil
4. Canada
5. Chile
6. China
7. Colombia
8. Costa Rica
9. Cuba
10. Dominican Republic
11. Ecuador
12. France
13. Germany
14. Guatemala
15. Holy See
16. Honduras
17. Italy
18. Japan
19. Mexico
20. Morocco
21. Nicaragua
22. Palestine
23. Panama
24. Peru
25. Qatar
26. South Korea
27. Sovereign Military Order of Malta
28. Spain
29. Turkey
30. United Kingdom
31. United States
32. Uruguay

=== Other delegations or posts ===
1. Egypt (Interest Section)
2. European Union (Delegation)

== Gallery of embassies ==
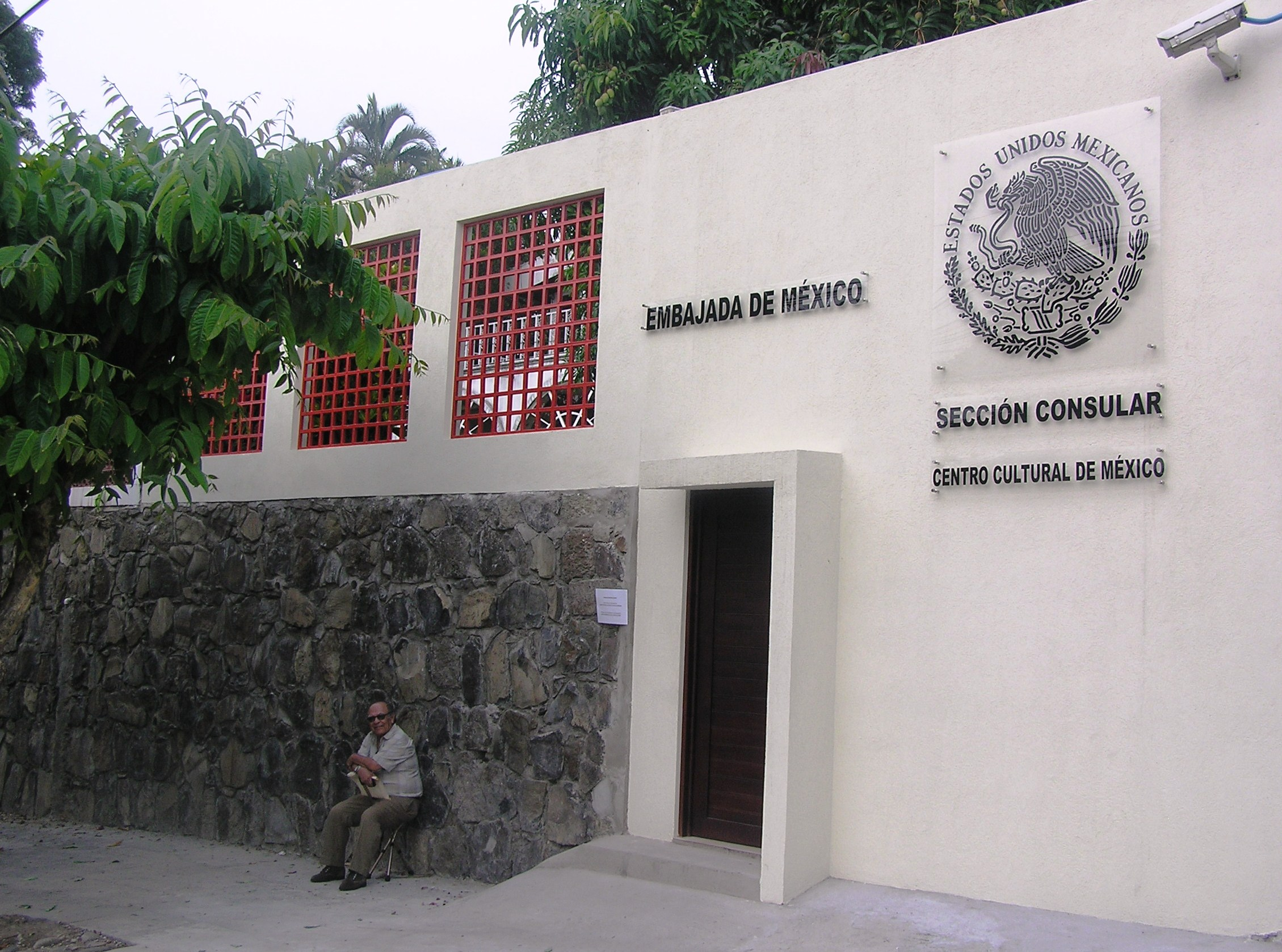
Embassy of Mexico

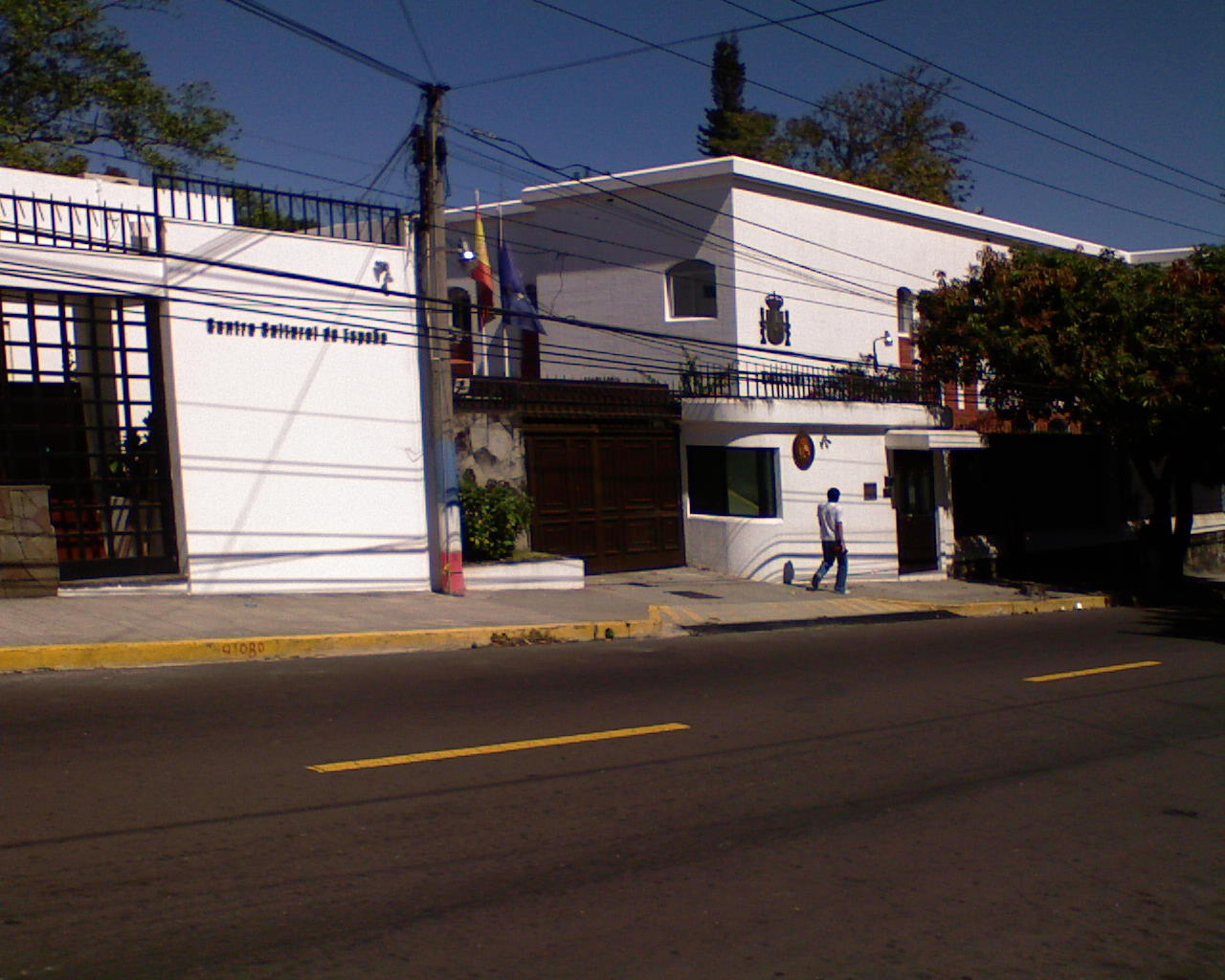
Embassy of Spain

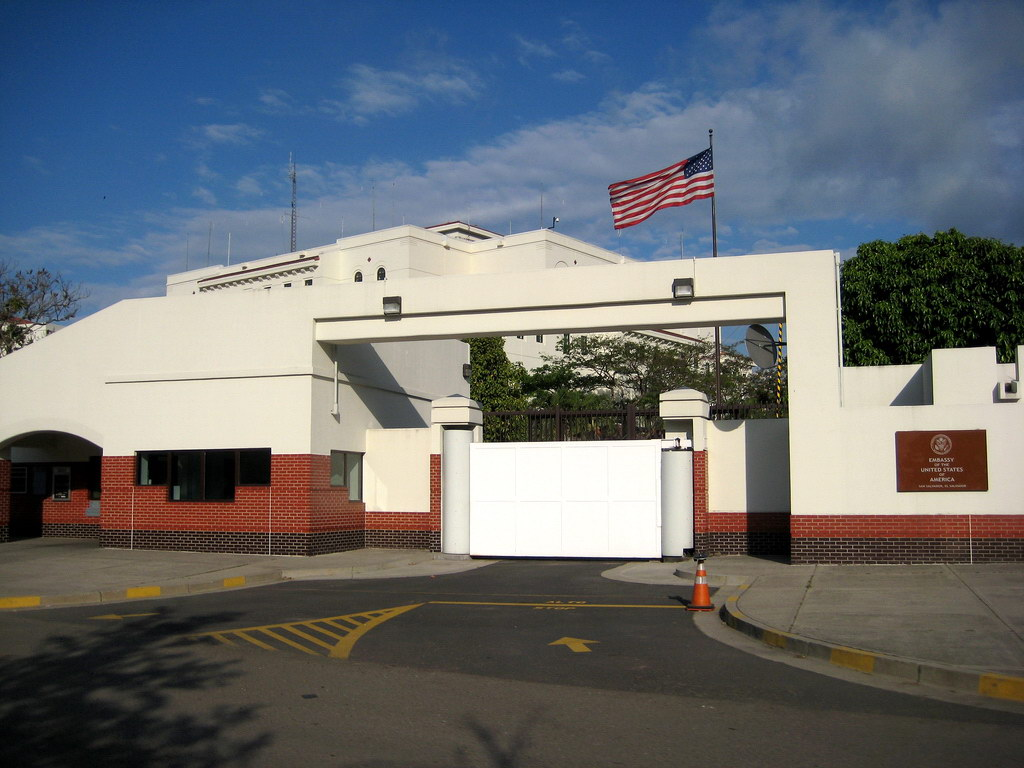
Embassy of the United States

== Non-resident embassies accredited to El Salvador ==
Located in Guatemala City

- Egypt
- India
- Israel
- Sweden

Located in Havana

- Cambodia
- Dominica
- Guinea
- Laos
- Mali
- Syria
- Tanzania
- Timor-Leste

Located in Mexico City

- Australia
- Algeria
- Bangladesh
- Indonesia
- Iran
- Iraq
- Ireland
- Ivory Coast
- Jordan
- Kazakhstan
- Kuwait
- Lebanon
- Libya
- Malaysia
- Nigeria
- Norway
- New Zealand
- Philippines
- Pakistan
- Saudi Arabia
- Serbia
- South Africa
- Taiwan
- United Arab Emirates
- Uzbekistan
- Vietnam

Located in New York City

- Comoros
- Guinea-Bissau
- Maldives
- Nauru
- Samoa
- Seychelles
- Sierra Leone
- Tonga

Located in San José, Costa Rica

- Bolivia
- Luxembourg
- Netherlands
- Paraguay
- Switzerland

Located in Washington, D.C.

- Afghanistan
- Bahrain
- Burundi
- Central African Republic
- Gabon
- Ghana
- Kenya
- Lesotho
- Oman
- Palau
- Senegal
- Singapore
- Togo
- Turkmenistan
- Tunisia
- Tajikistan
- Uganda
- Zimbabwe
- Zambia

Located elsewhere

- Iceland (Ottawa)
- Russia (Managua)
- Thailand (Santiago de Chile)

== Former Embassies ==
- Israel
- Switzerland (closed in 1979)
- Taiwan
- Venezuela (2019)

== See also ==
- Foreign relations of El Salvador
