= Canada–El Salvador relations =

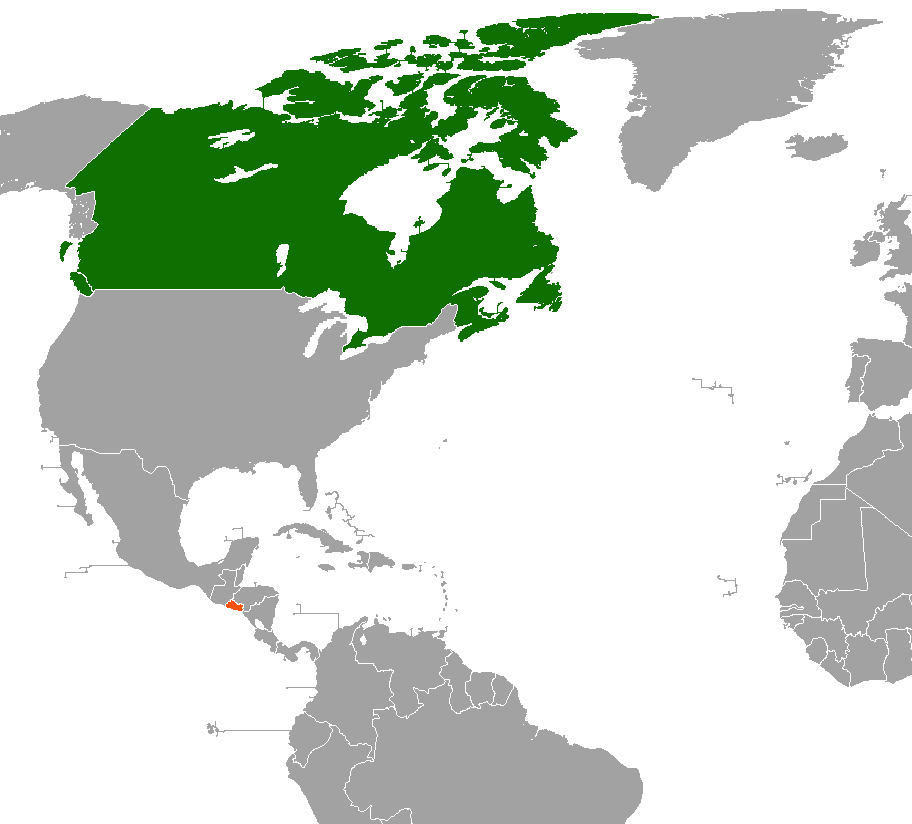

- Canada: El Salvador

Diplomatic relations between Canada and El Salvador were established in 1961. Both nations are members of the Organization of American States and the United Nations.

== History ==
Diplomatic relations between Canada and El Salvador were established on 29 December 1961. El Salvador opened its embassy in Ottawa in 1973. Initially, Canada accredited an ambassador to El Salvador based in Costa Rica and then from Guatemala. In 1995, Canada opened a diplomatic office in San Salvador before establishing a resident embassy in 2005.

During the Salvadoran Civil War, Canada accepted thousands of Salvadoran refugees fleeing the war. In 1981, Canada cut aid to El Salvador because of concerns about death squads in the country. Aid was renewed in 1985. After the signing of the Chapultepec Peace Accords in January 1992, Canada pledged up to $5 million for poverty alleviation, human rights promotion and democratization in El Salvador.

In January 2001, an earthquake struck El Salvador killing over 900 people. Canada immediately sent the 436 Transport Squadron with aid supplies to El Salvador. Between 2001 and 2010, Canada and El Salvador (along with Guatemala, Honduras and Nicaragua) negotiated the Canada–Central American Four Free Trade Agreement, however, after twelve rounds of negotiations, no agreement had been reached and the free trade agreement remains defunct.

In October 2018, both nations signed an agreement for direct air transportation. In 2021, both nations celebrated 60 years of diplomatic relations.

== High-level visits ==
High-level visits from Canada to El Salvador

- Foreign Vice Minister Jon Allen (2011)
- Foreign Minister of State Diane Ablonczy (2011)
- Foreign Vice Minister Michael Grant (2018)

High-level visits from El Salvador to Canada

- President Armando Calderón Sol (1996)
- President Francisco Flores Pérez (2001)

== Transportation ==
There are direct flights between both nations with Air Transat and Avianca El Salvador.

== Trade ==
In 2023, trade between Canada and El Salvador totaled US$354 million. Canada's main exports to El Salvador include: farm and fishing products; consumer goods; basic and industrial chemical, plastic, and rubber products; forestry products and building and packaging materials; industrial machinery, equipment, and parts. El Salvador's main exports to Canada include: electronic and electrical equipment and parts; sugar, clothing and coffee. Canadian multinational company, Scotiabank operates in El Salvador.

== Resident diplomatic missions ==
of Canada in El Salvador

- San Salvador (Embassy)

of El Salvador in Canada

- Ottawa (Embassy)
- Calgary (Consulate-General)
- Montreal (Consulate-General)
- Toronto (Consulate-General)
- Vancouver (Consulate-General)
- Winnipeg (Consulate-General)

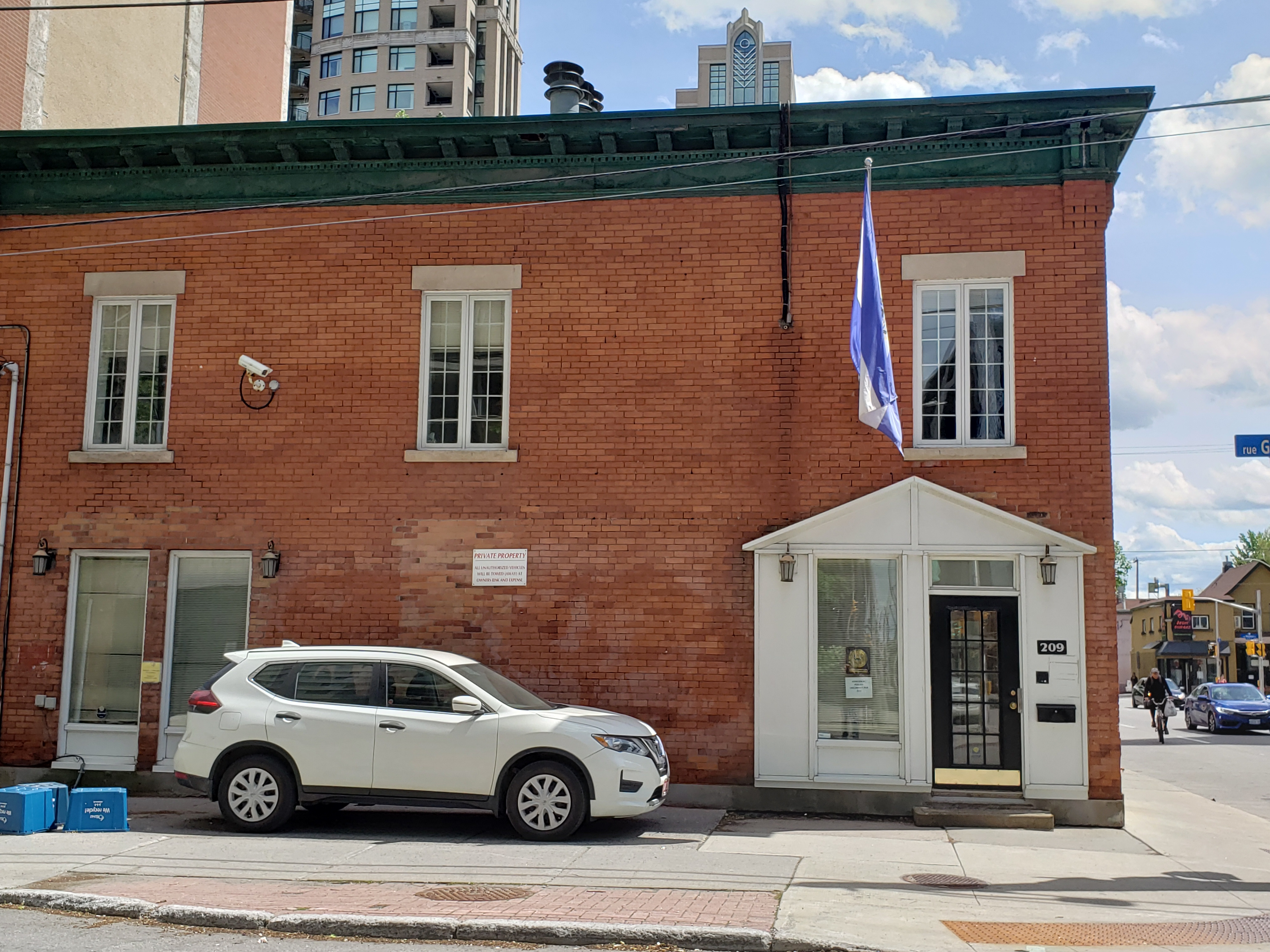
Embassy of El Salvador in Ottawa

== See also ==
- Foreign relations of Canada
- Foreign relations of El Salvador
- Latin American Canadians
