= El Salvador–Sahrawi Arab Democratic Republic relations =

Bilateral relations

- El Salvador: Sahrawi Arab Democratic Republic

El Salvador–Sahrawi Arab Democratic Republic relations were bilateral relations between the Republic of El Salvador and the Sahrawi Arab Democratic Republic. El Salvador recognized the Sahrawi Republic's sovereignty from 1989 to 1997 and from 2016 to 2019. Since 2019, El Salvador has recognized Morocco's sovereignty over Western Sahara and does not have diplomatic relations with the Sahrawi Republic.

== History ==
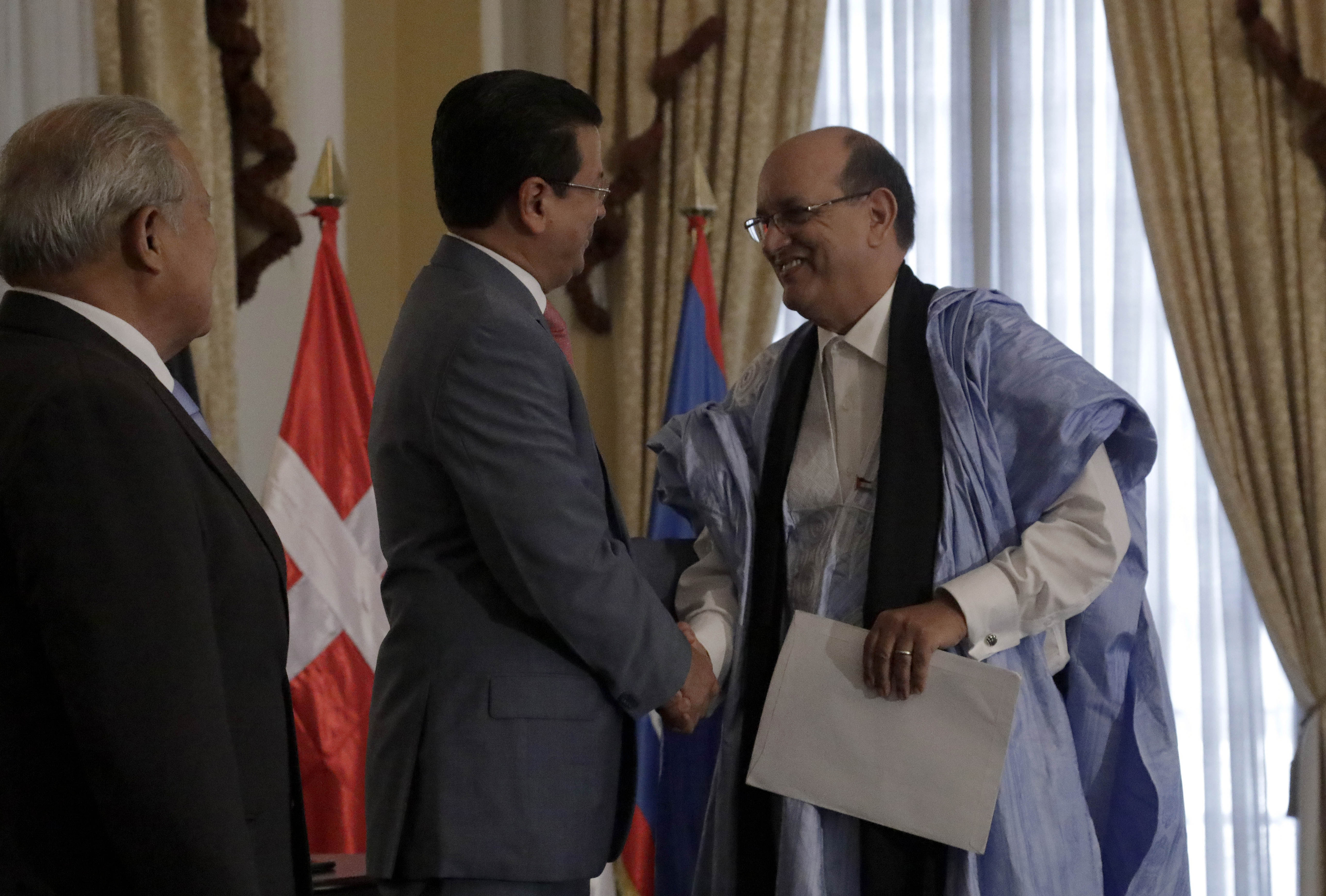
Salvadoran foreign minister Hugo Martínez with Sahrawi diplomat Sueilima Tieb Ahmed Salem in 2017

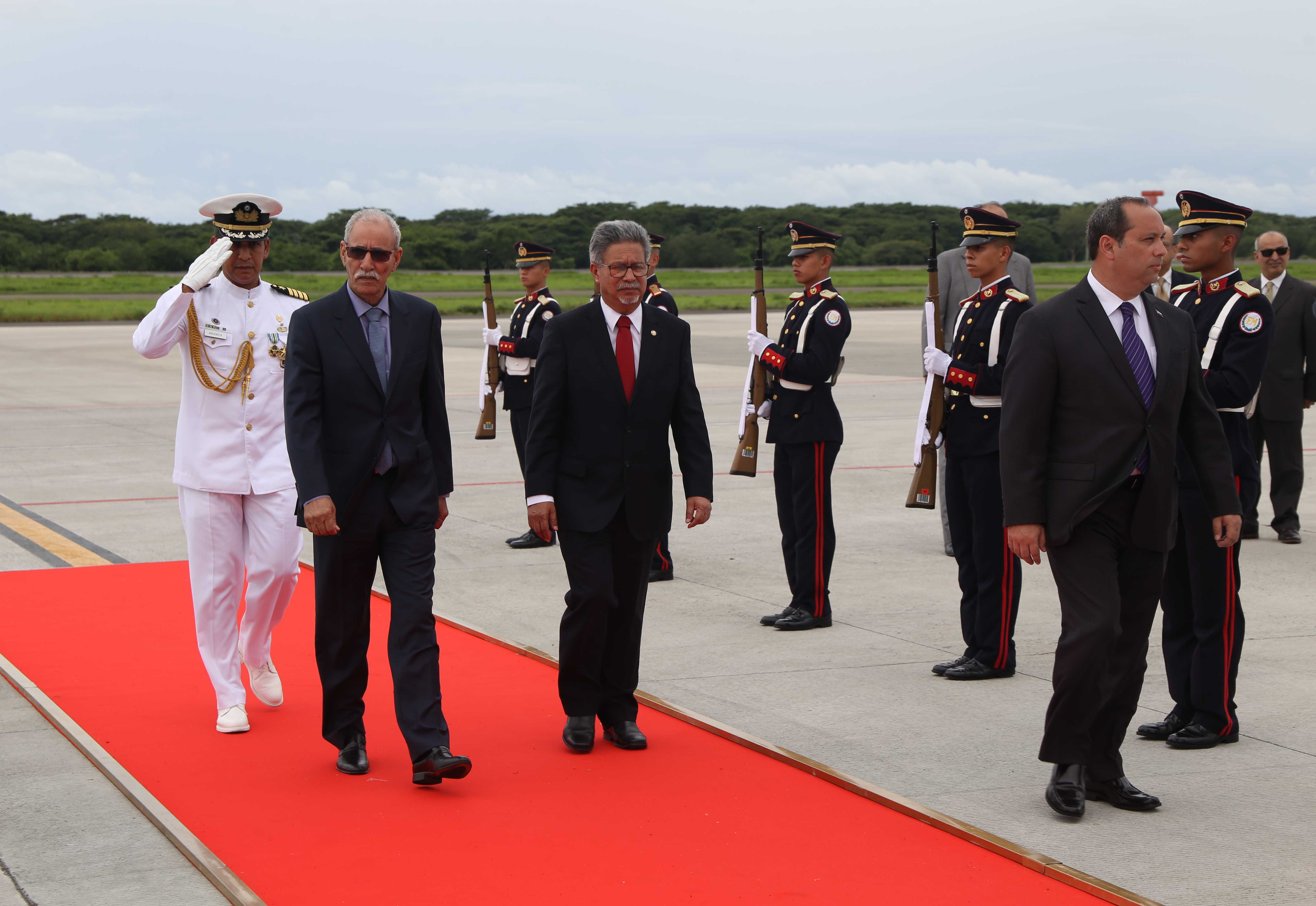
Sahrawi president Brahim Ghali with Salvadoran foreign minister Carlos Castañeda in May 2019

El Salvador recognized the sovereignty of the Sahrawi Arab Democratic Republic on 31 July 1989. El Salvador withdrew recognition in April 1997.

Sahrawi president Mohamed Abdelaziz attended the 1 June 2009 inauguration of Salvadoran president Mauricio Funes as a part of a broader state visit to El Salvador. During the visit, Abdelaziz visited the tomb of Schafik Hándal, the former leader of the Farabundo Martí National Liberation Front (FMLN) who supported Sahrawi independence from Morocco. El Salvador and the Sahrawi Republic formally resumed diplomatic relations on 3 November 2016 and Salvadoran president Salvador Sánchez Cerén received diplomatic credentials from Sahrawi diplomat Sueilima Tieb Ahmed Salem in September 2017.

Sahrawi president Brahim Ghali attended the 1 June 2019 inauguration of Salvadoran president Nayib Bukele. On 15 June 2019, Bukele withdrew recognition of the Sahrawi Republic and recognized Moroccan sovereignty over Western Sahara. He described El Salvador's recognition as having been done "for ideological reasons" and described the Sahrawi Republic as "a virtual, non-existent republic, which has no territory or population". Mansour Omar, the Polisario Front's minister delegate for Latin America and the Caribbean, stated that the Sahrawi Republic would continue to maintain relations with El Salvador. The FMLN criticized the withdrawal of recognition as support for "neo-colonial and expansionist regimes" ("regímenes neo-coloniales y expansionistas").

In December 2019, Salvadoran foreign minister Alexandra Hill Tinoco reaffirmed El Salvador's "final withdraw" of recognition of the Sahrawi Republic. In 2025, Salvadoran vice president Félix Ulloa mentioned the possibility of opening a consulate to Morocco in Laayoune, the de jure capital city of the Sahrawi Republic.

== See also ==
- El Salvador–Morocco relations
- Foreign relations of El Salvador
- Foreign relations of the Sahrawi Arab Democratic Republic
