= El Salvador–Spain relations =

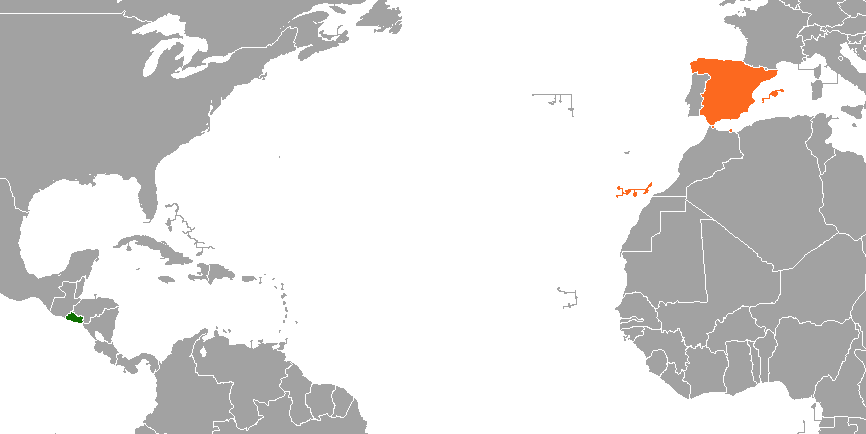

- El Salvador: Spain

Diplomatic mission
- Embassy of El Salvador, Madrid: Embassy of Spain, San Salvador

El Salvador and Spain have long-standing cultural and diplomatic relations, owing to the history of the Spanish Empire. Bilateral relations between the two as sovereign states began in 1865. Both nations are members of the Association of Academies of the Spanish Language, Organization of Ibero-American States and the United Nations.

== History ==
=== Spanish colonization ===
The first known visit by Spaniards to what is now Salvadoran territory was made by the admiral Andrés Niño, who led an expedition to Central America. He disembarked in the Gulf of Fonseca on 31 May 1522, at Meanguera island, naming it Petronila, and then traversed to Jiquilisco Bay on the mouth of Lempa River. The first indigenous people to have contact with the Spanish were the Lenca of eastern El Salvador.

In 1524, Spanish explorer and conquistador Pedro de Alvarado launched a campaign against the Pipil people, the native inhabitants of Cuzcatlán (present day El Salvador). By 1528, Spanish troops defeated the Pipil warriors and established a permanent presence in present-day San Salvador.

After the conquest, the territory of El Salvador officially became part of the Spanish Empire and governed from the Viceroyalty of New Spain in Mexico City but administered by the regional capital in Guatemala City. Under the Spanish Empire, the territory of El Salvador became an agricultural heartland of the captaincy general of Guatemala. Most of the land produced cocoa, coffee and indigo.

=== Independence ===
In November 1811, independence movement leaders José Matías Delgado, a Catholic priest, and his nephew, Manuel José Arce issued a call for independence from Spain. Due to the movement, several uprisings took place throughout the territory, which were quickly suppressed by the Spanish authorities. In 1821, the call for independence was endorsed by officials in Guatemala, however, El Salvador was opposed to its territory being incorporated into the Mexican Empire under Emperor Agustín de Iturbide. Because of this issue, El Salvador was seeking to be annexed by the United States when in 1823, the Mexican Empire collapsed and El Salvador joined Guatemala, Honduras, Costa Rica and Nicaragua in the joint United Provinces of Central America. The union was dissolved in 1839.

=== Post independence ===
On 24 June 1865, El Salvador and Spain established diplomatic relations and signed a Treaty of Peace and Friendship. Since the establishment of diplomatic relations, bilateral relations between both nations have been limited. In 1936, El Salvador, under General Maximiliano Hernández Martínez, recognized the government of General Francisco Franco. In 1977, Spanish King Juan Carlos I paid an official visit to El Salvador.

During the Salvadoran Civil War from 1979 – 1992, Spain paid an active role in trying to find a peaceful resolution to the conflict between the government and the Farabundo Martí National Liberation Front (FMLN). In November 1989, five Spanish priests were assassinated at the Central American University by Salvadoran soldiers. In 1992, representatives of the Salvadoran government and the FMLN signed the Chapultepec Peace Accords in Mexico City and was presided by representatives of the Spanish government.

In 2007, Spanish King Juan Carlos I paid a second visit to El Salvador. The King returned again in 2008, accompanied by Spanish Prime Minister José Luis Rodríguez Zapatero to attend the Ibero-American Summit being held in San Salvador. In 2010, Spanish airline Iberia launched direct flights from Madrid to San Salvador.

== High-level visits ==
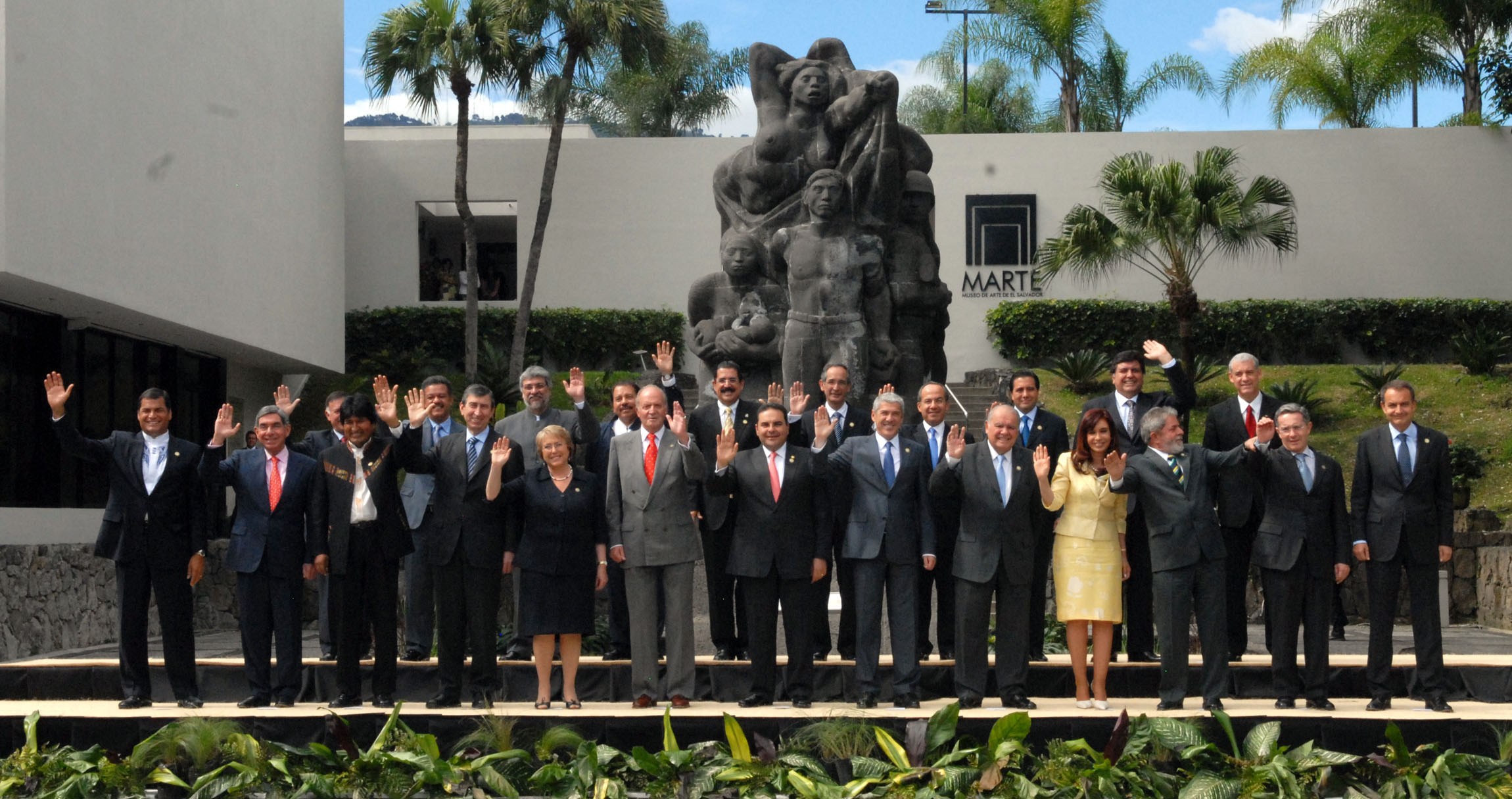
Salvadoran President Antonio Saca along with Spanish King Juan Carlos I and Prime Minister José Luis Rodríguez Zapatero attending the Ibero-American Summit in San Salvador; October 2008.

Presidential visits from El Salvador to Spain

- President José Napoleón Duarte (1985)
- President Alfredo Cristiani (1992)
- President Armando Calderón Sol (1997)
- President Francisco Flores Pérez (2000, 2003, 2004)
- President Antonio Saca (2005, 2009)
- President Mauricio Funes (2012)

Royal and Prime Ministerial visits from Spain to El Salvador

- King Juan Carlos I (1977, 2007, 2008)
- Prime Minister Felipe González (1995)
- Prime Minister José María Aznar (2003)
- Prime Minister José Luis Rodríguez Zapatero (2008)
- Crowned Prince Felipe (2009, 2014)
- Queen Letizia of Spain (2015)
- King Felipe VI (2024)
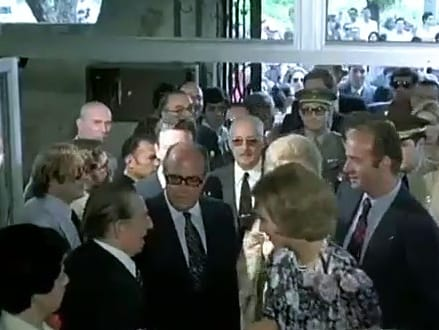
King Juan Carlos I and Queen Sofía in San Salvador; September 1977.

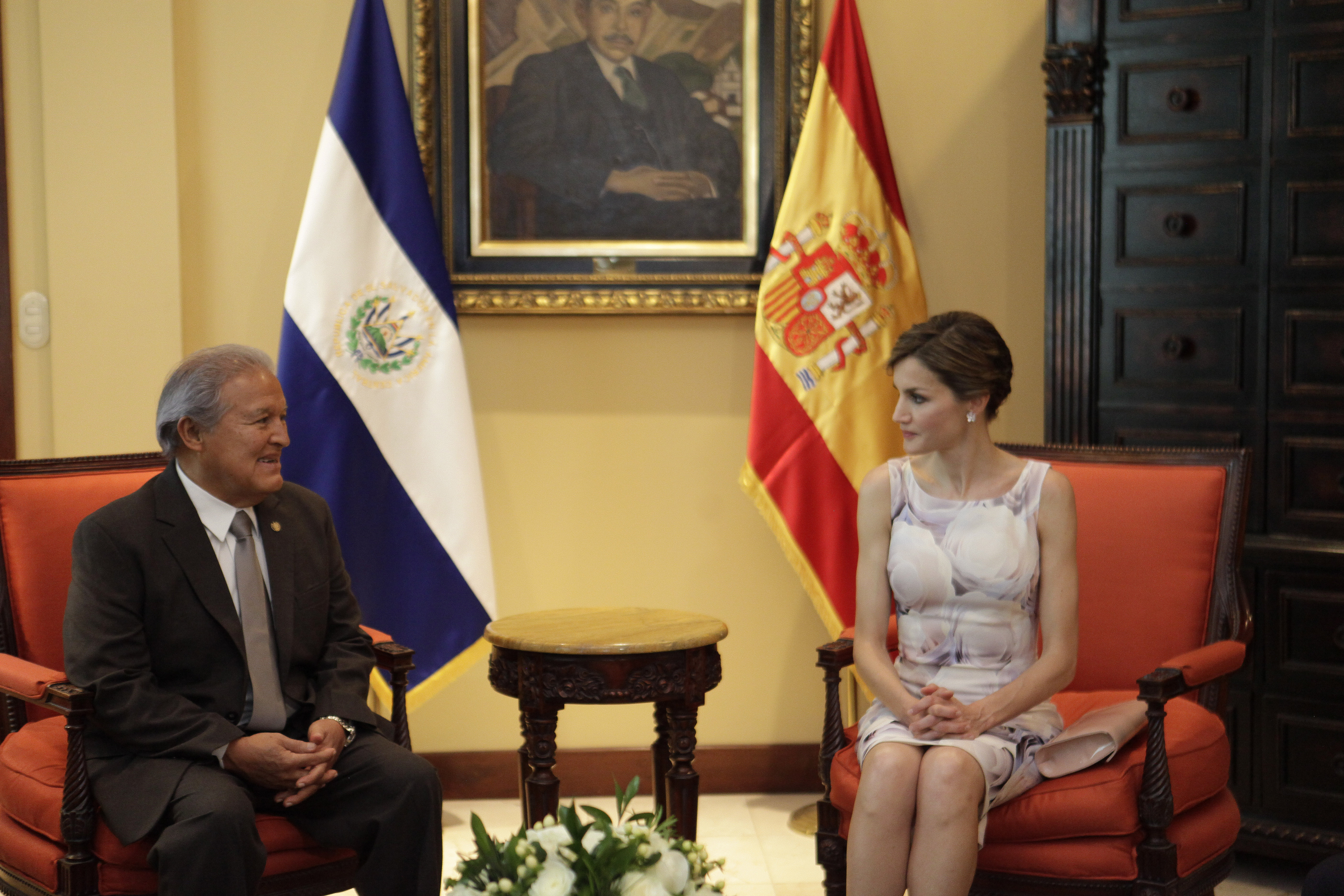
President Salvador Sanchez Cerén and Queen Letizia in San Salvador; May 2015.

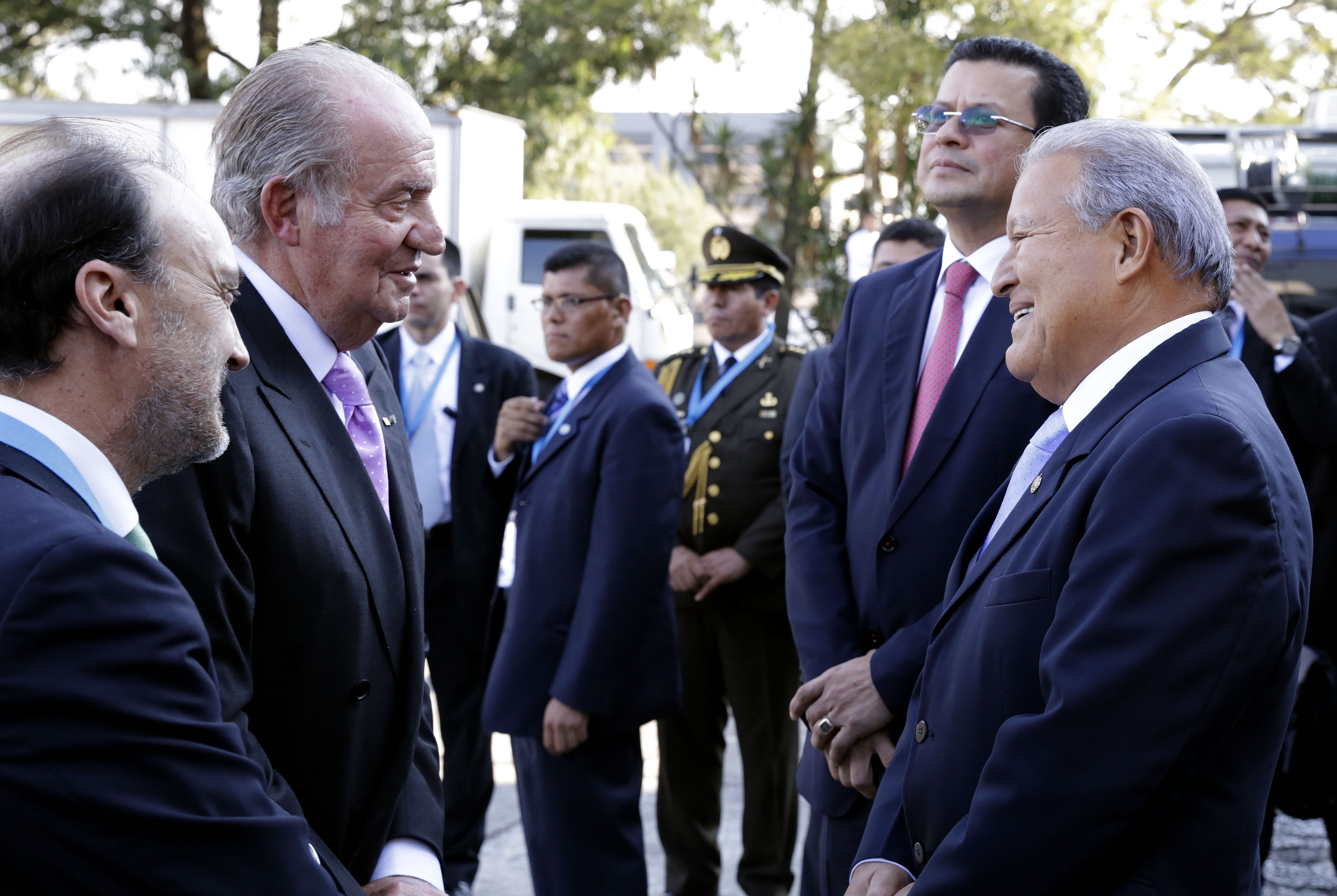
King Juan Carlos I and President Salvador Sanchez Cerén in Guatemala; January 2016.

== Bilateral agreements ==
Over the years, both El Salvador and Spain have signed numerous bilateral agreements and treaties such as: Treaty on consular protection (1953); Agreement on visa waiver for nationals of both nations (1959); Scientific and technical cooperation agreement (1988); Agreement on the promotion and protection of investments (1996); Extradition treaty (1997); Air transportation agreement (1997); and an Agreement on the avoidance of double taxation (2008).

== Transport ==
There are direct flights between both nations with Iberia.

== Trade ==
In 2025, trade between El Salvador and Spain totaled €249 million Euros. El Salvador's main exports to Spain include: coffee and tuna. Spain's main exports to El Salvador include: machinery, chemicals, plastics, drugs, electrical appliances and iron and steel foundry; food, cars and cosmetics. Spain is El Salvador's eleventh biggest trading partner globally and sixth biggest foreign investor. Spanish multinational companies such as Mapfre, Telefónica and Zara operate in El Salvador.

== Resident diplomatic missions ==
of El Salvador in Spain

- Madrid (Embassy)
- Madrid (Consulate-General)
- Barcelona (Consulate-General)
- Seville (Consulate-General)

of Spain in El Salvador

- San Salvador (Embassy)

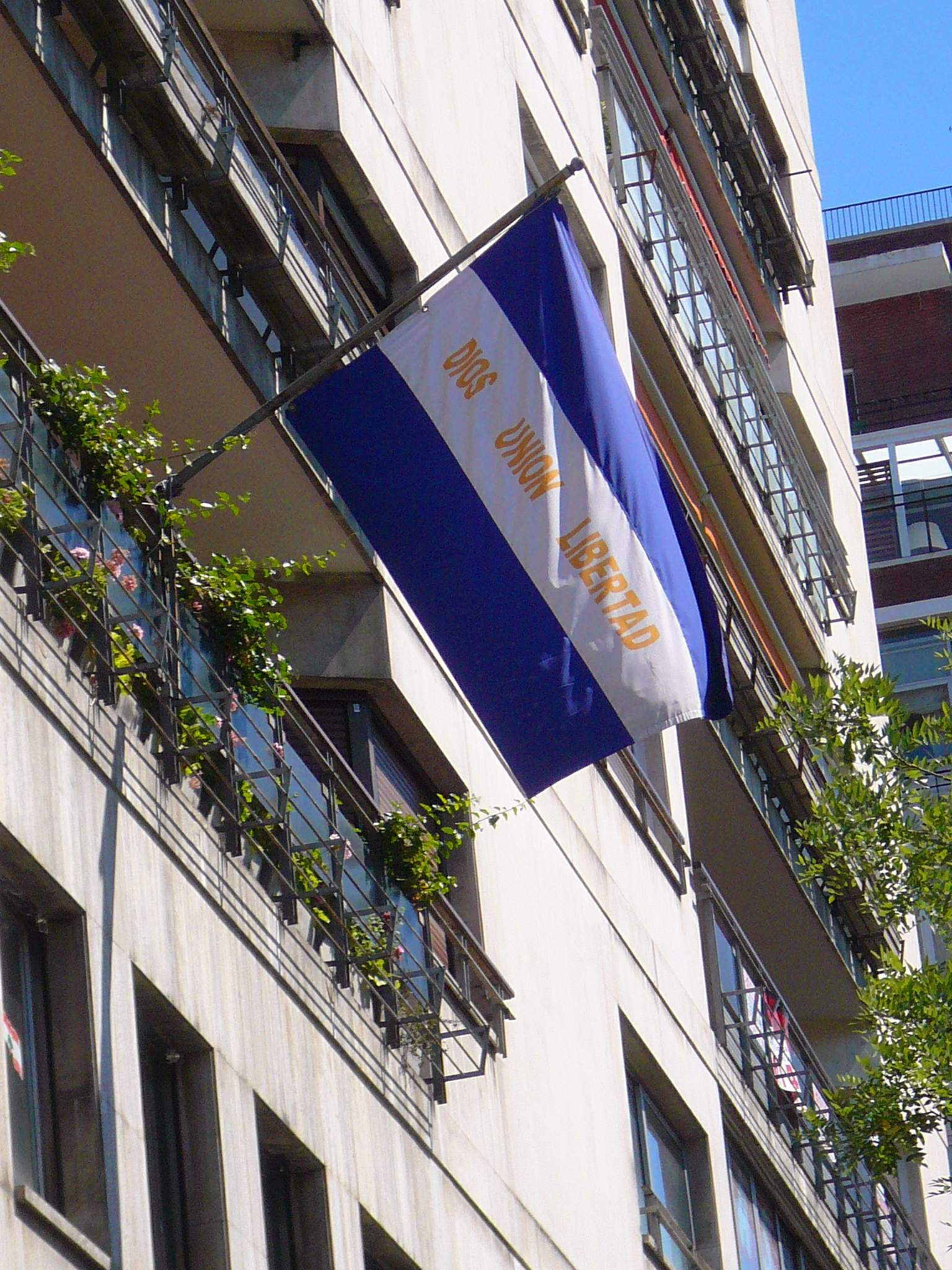
Embassy of El Salvador in Madrid

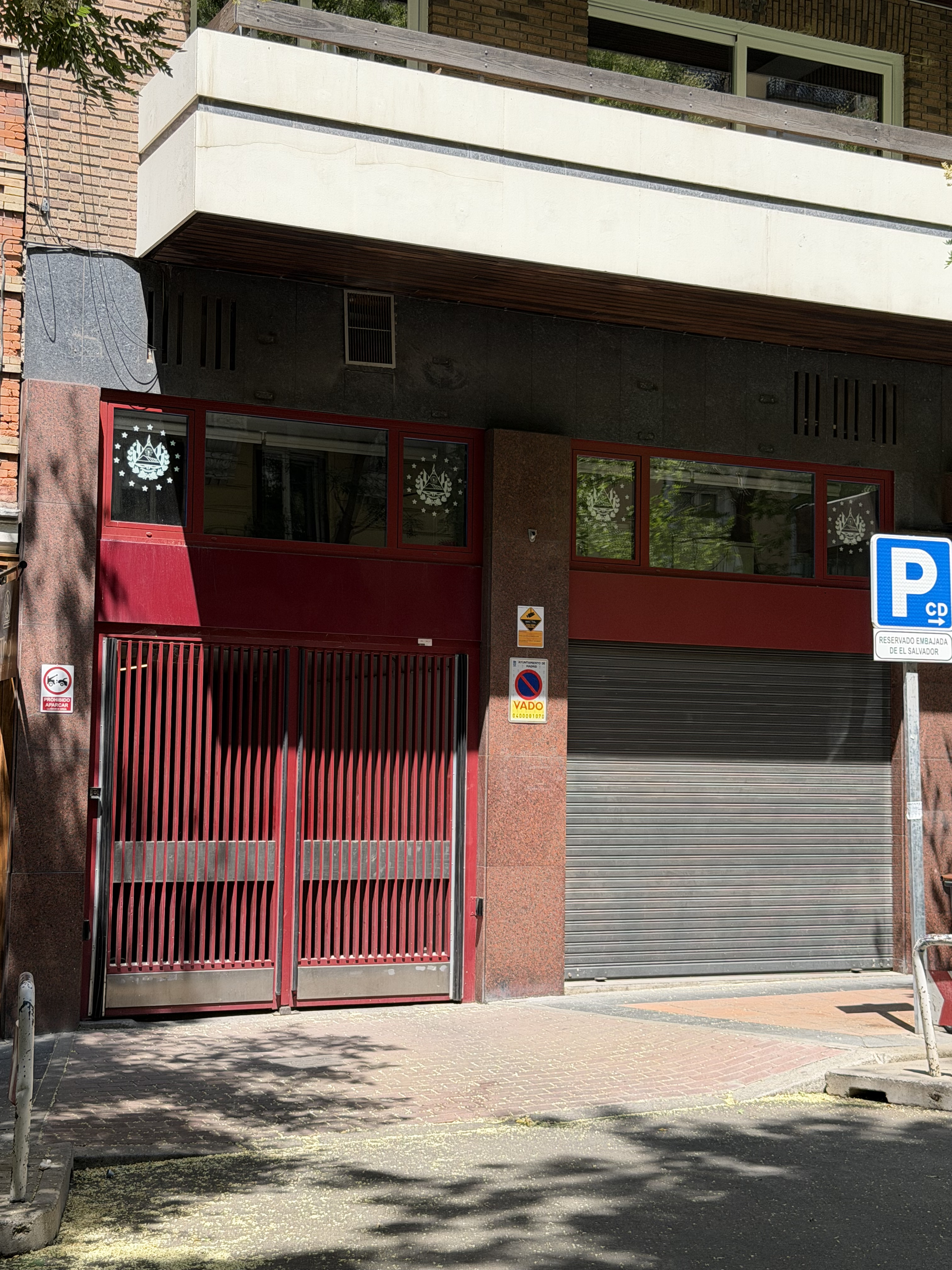
Consulate-General of El Salvador in Madrid

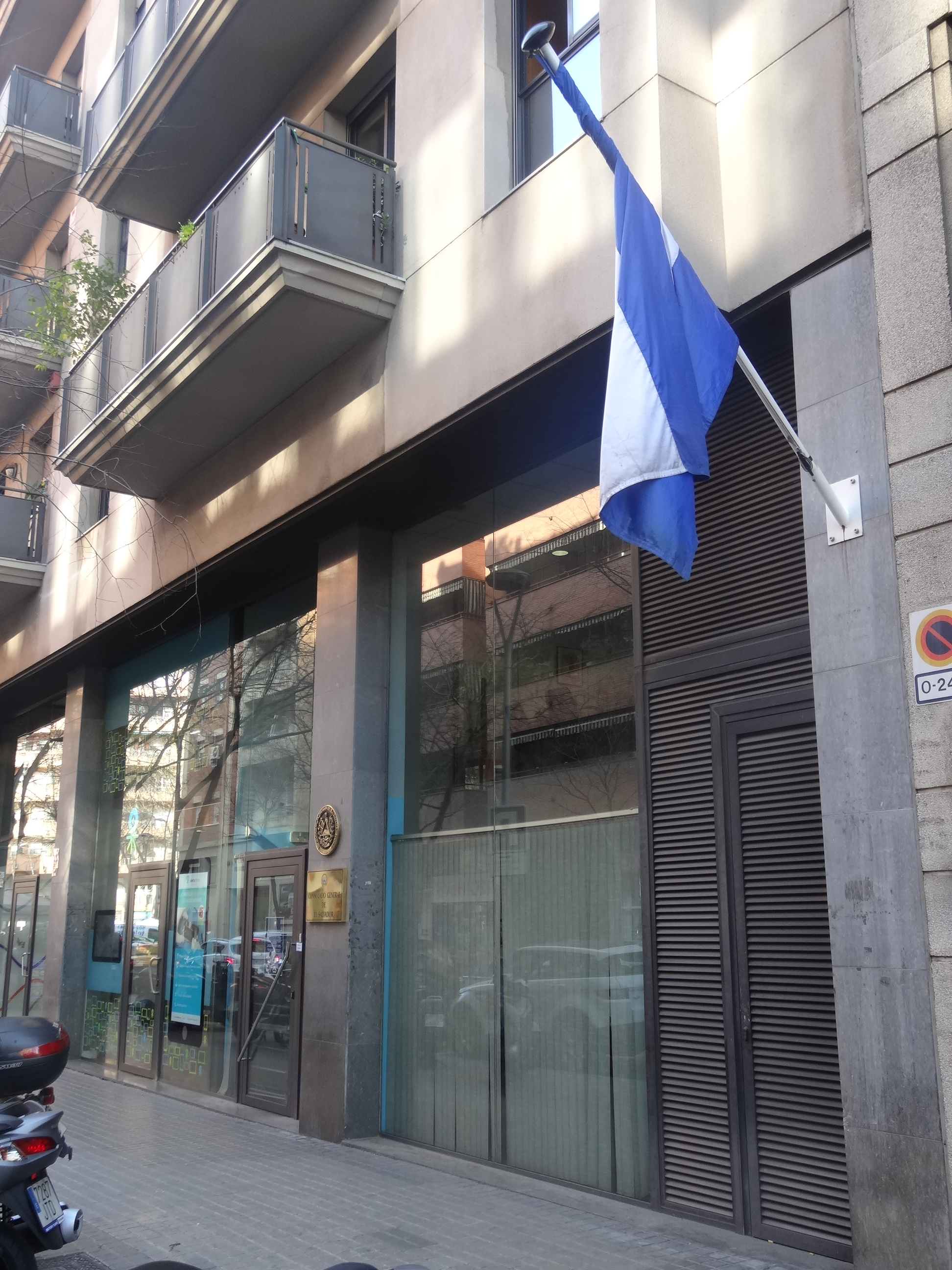
Consulate-General of El Salvador in Barcelona
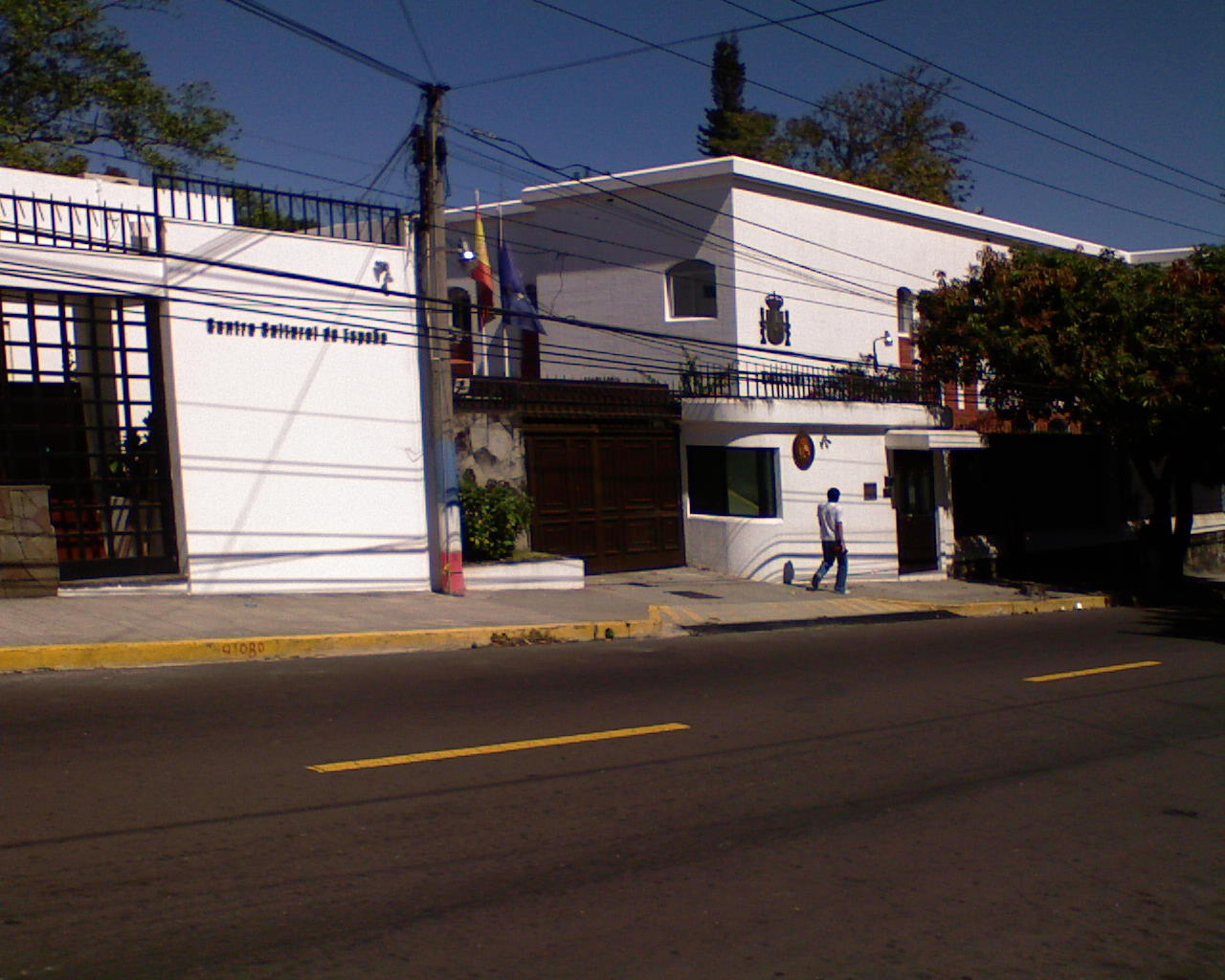
Embassy of Spain in San Salvador

== See also ==
- Foreign relations of El Salvador
- Foreign relations of Spain
- Salvadoran Spanish
