= El Salvador–Morocco relations =

Bilateral relations

- El Salvador: Morocco

Diplomatic mission
- Rabat: San Salvador

Envoy
- Ambassador Ignacio de Cossío: Chargé d'Affaires Brahim Badi

El Salvador–Morocco relations are the bilateral relations between the Republic of El Salvador and the Kingdom of Morocco. El Salvador previously recognized the Sahrawi Arab Democratic Republic from 1989 to 1997 and 2016–2019, but since 2019, it has recognized Moroccan sovereignty over Western Sahara.

== History ==
On 15 June 2019, El Salvador withdrew its recognition of the Sahrawi Republic and recognized Moroccan sovereignty over Western Sahara, having recognized it since 1989. Salvadoran president Nayib Bukele described El Salvador's recognition of the Sahrawi Republic as having "isolated the country from Morocco and the Arab world" and as having been made for "purely ideological reasons".

El Salvador opened an embassy in Rabat, its first embassy in Africa, on 13 October 2022. In May 2025, Salvadoran vice president Félix Ulloa mentioned the possibility of opening a consulate in Laayoune in Western Sahara. Salvadoran first lady Gabriela Rodríguez de Bukele visited Morocco in July 2025.

== See also ==
- El Salvador–Sahrawi Arab Democratic Republic relations
