= El Salvador–Venezuela relations =

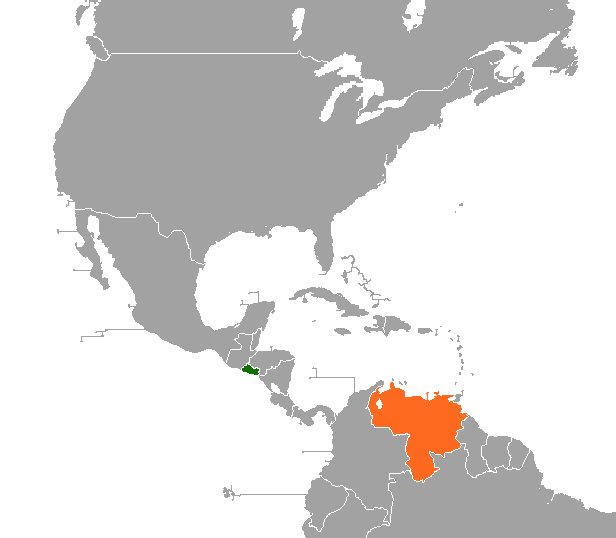

- El Salvador: Venezuela

Foreign relations between El Salvador and Venezuela are strained, and the two have not maintained bilateral relations since 2019.

== History ==
El Salvador was among the ten countries from Central America and the Caribbean that signed the Caracas Energy Agreement on October 19, 2000, under which Venezuela would sell oil under preferential payment conditions, including a one-year grace period and fifteen-year credit terms, with a 2% annual interest rate. In September 2012, due to the continued rise in fuel prices in El Salvador, the country decided to request entry into the Petrocaribe organization.

In 2017, Salvadoran President Salvador Sánchez Cerén expressed solidarity with Venezuelan President Nicolás Maduro during the protests in Venezuela and later congratulated him on the election of the National Constituent Assembly.

El Salvador expressed support for the 2018 Venezuelan presidential elections, recognized the results that declared Nicolás Maduro the winner, and abstained from a resolution by the Organization of American States approved on June 5, 2018, which rejected the outcome of the presidential elections.

In 2019, the Legislative Assembly of El Salvador refused to recognize Maduro as Venezuela’s president and expressed support for Juan Guaidó during the country’s presidential crisis. In contrast, the Salvadoran government issued a statement supporting Nicolás Maduro and rejecting Guaidó’s swearing-in.

In November 2019, the Venezuelan government expelled El Salvador's diplomats in a reciprocal move after El Salvador had expelled Venezuelan diplomats. El Salvador recognized opposition leader Juan Guaidó as the legitimate President of Venezuela, cutting off relations with disputed president Nicolás Maduro's government.

After El Salvador's 2019 presidential elections, in which Nayib Bukele was elected, the country shifted its stance, voicing support for Juan Guaidó and becoming strongly critical of Nicolás Maduro’s regime. In November of that year, Bukele ordered the expulsion of Maduro’s diplomatic representatives from Salvadoran territory. In 2020, El Salvador’s Ministry of Foreign Affairs congratulated Juan Guaidó on his reelection as president of Venezuela’s National Assembly through the Delegate Commission election, urging new presidential elections to begin a resolution process to the country’s crisis.

On March 16, 2025, through an agreement between Trump and Bukele, the use of the CECOT facility was authorized for the imprisonment of members of the Tren de Aragua gang. Currently, 238 Venezuelans are being held in CECOT. The Venezuelan government has rejected this measure, claiming it constitutes persecution. On April 20, 2025, Salvadoran President Nayib Bukele proposed a humanitarian agreement to Nicolás Maduro, which included the repatriation of 252 Venezuelans imprisoned in CECOT in exchange for the release of an equal number of political prisoners in Venezuela, including Rafael Tudares, Roland Carreño, Rocío San Miguel, and about 50 citizens from 22 other nationalities. Although El Salvador’s Ministry of Foreign Affairs formalized the proposal through official communication on April 22, 2025, by April 29, the Venezuelan government had yet to respond to the diplomatic initiative.

On July 18, 2025, Salvadoran President Nayib Bukele announced the repatriation of all Venezuelan nationals who were detained in Salvadoran territory. These individuals had been accused of belonging to the criminal organization known as Tren de Aragua (TDA). The measure was part of a bilateral agreement that included the exchange of these detainees for a significant group of Venezuelan political prisoners, as well as U.S. citizens who had been held hostage in Venezuela.

According to Bukele, the operation was the result of months of diplomatic negotiations with the Venezuelan regime, which for years had refused to release what it considered its main bargaining chips: foreign hostages and political prisoners.

Subsequently, U.S. Secretary of State Marco Rubio confirmed via his official account on the social platform X that a total of ten American citizens had been released as part of the agreement. Rubio expressed his gratitude to President Bukele for facilitating the deal, highlighting both the release of the American hostages and the Venezuelan political prisoners.

== See also ==
- Foreign relations of El Salvador
- Foreign relations of Venezuela
