= El Salvador–Uruguay relations =

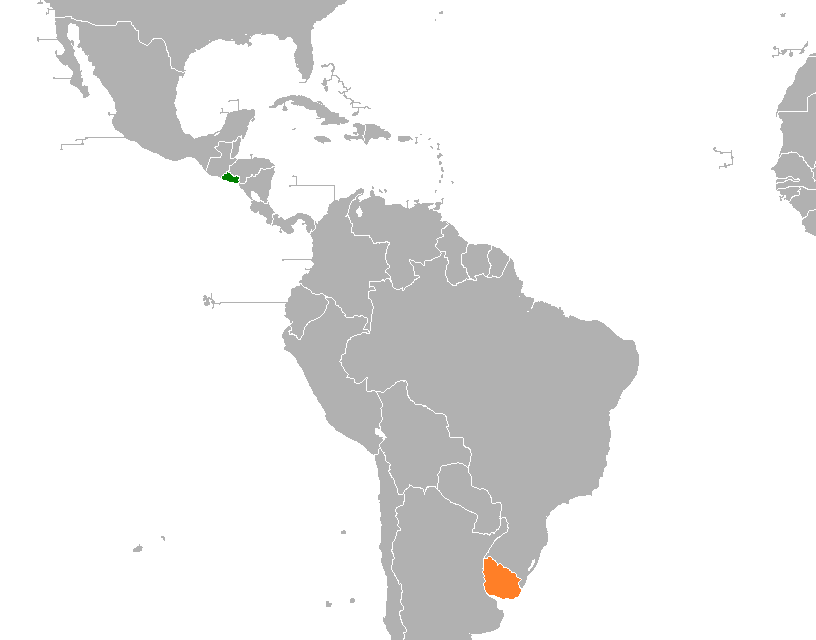

- El Salvador: Uruguay

El Salvador and Uruguay share a common history in the fact that both nations were once part of the Spanish Empire. Formal diplomatic relations were established in 1929. Both nations are members of the Community of Latin American and Caribbean States, Group of 77, Organization of American States, Organization of Ibero-American States and the United Nations.

== History ==
Both El Salvador and Uruguay were once part of the Spanish Empire. During the Spanish colonial period, El Salvador was governed from the Viceroyalty of New Spain in Mexico City while Uruguay was then part of the Viceroyalty of the Río de la Plata and administered from Buenos Aires. In 1828, Uruguay obtained its independence after the Cisplatine War. In 1841, El Salvador obtained its independence after the dissolution of the Federal Republic of Central America. In January 1929, both nations established diplomatic relations.

Bilateral relations between both nations have taken place primarily in multilateral forums. In 2006, Salvadoran President Antonio Saca traveled to Uruguay to attend the 16th Ibero-American Summit in Montevideo. In 2008, Uruguayan President Tabaré Vázquez traveled to El Salvador to attend the 18th Ibero-American Summit in San Salvador. In December 2012, Salvadoran Vice President, Salvador Sánchez Cerén, paid a visit to Uruguay and met with President José Mujica.

== Bilateral agreements ==
Both nations have signed several agreements such as an Agreement for Technical Cooperation (1986); Memorandum of Understanding to regulate cooperation relations (1999); Agreement for Technical Cooperation on the Environment and Climate Change (2013); Agreement for Educational and Cultural Cooperation (2013); Agreement for Political Cooperation (2013); Agreement on Economic and Commercial Cooperation (2013); Agreement on Touristic Cooperation (2013); Agreement for Technical and Scientific Cooperation (2013) and an Agreement of Cooperation on the matters of Peace Operations (2013).

== Resident diplomatic missions ==
- El Salvador has an embassy in Montevideo.
- Uruguay has an embassy in San Salvador.

== See also ==
- Foreign relations of El Salvador
- Foreign relations of Uruguay
