= El Salvador–India relations =

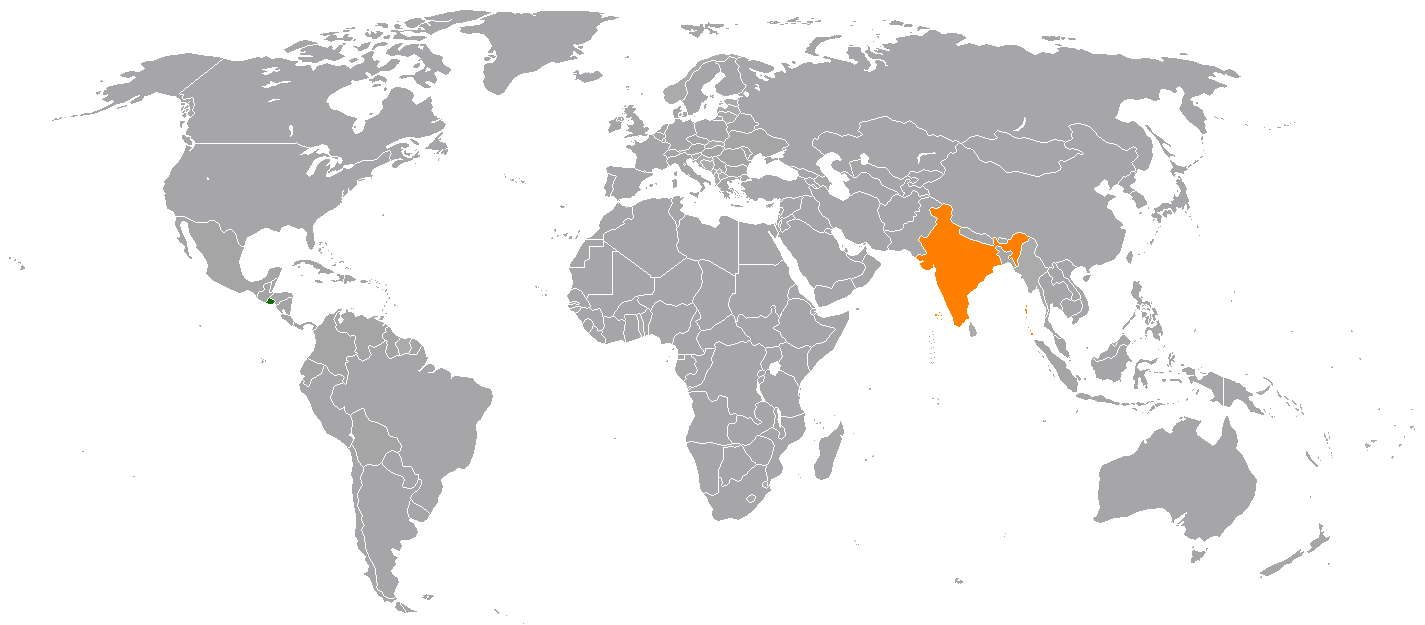

- El Salvador: India

El Salvador and India have maintained diplomatic relations since 1979. El Salvador maintains an embassy in New Delhi and an honorary consulate in Bangalore. The Embassy of India in Guatemala is jointly accredited to El Salvador. India also maintains an honorary consulate in San Salvador.

== History ==
Diplomatic relations between El Salvador and India were established on 12 February 1979. The Embassy of El Salvador in London was concurrently accredited to India until June 2008, when El Salvador opened its embassy in New Delhi. The Embassy of India in Panama City was initially concurrently accredited to El Salvador, but this was later changed to the Embassy of India in Guatemala City.

The two countries signed a memorandum of understanding on holding regular consultations between their respective foreign ministries in February 2004. The first Foreign Office Consultations between El Salvador and India were held in August 2012. The same month, they signed an agreement on co-operation in science, technology & innovation. In November 2010, Salvadoran Ambassador to India Zamora Rivas stated that India was "very much central to our [El Salvador's] future plans" with regard to increasing the country's business ties with Asia.

Salvadoran Foreign Ministers Maria Eugenia Brizuela de Avila, Francisco E. Lainez, and Hugo Martinez visited India in February 2004, March 2007, and March 2011 respectively. Vice President Ana Vilma de Escobar visited the country in January 2008 to attend the CII Partnership Summit. Several other Salvadoran ministers have also visited the country. From India, the highest level visits to El Salvador have been at the level of minister of state.

In March 2011, the two countries signed a memorandum of understanding on Fisheries and Aquaculture.

Meeting between El-Salvador's foreign minister Alexandra Hill Tinoco and Indian foreign minister Dr.S.Jaishankar took place in 2023. They discussed areas of cooperation including Health, Solar power, capacity building and expanding commerce between the two nations. S.Jaishankar stated that India looks forward to have closer engagement with Central American Integration System (SICA).

In 2023, El Salvador introduced mandatory airport improvement fee of $1300 for any citizen of India and 56 other countries of Africa that are traveling to/through El Salvador. This may be motivated by United States to curb "illegal immigrants" using El Salvador to enter US.

== Trade ==
Bilateral trade between El Salvador and India totaled US$74.72 million in 2015-16, recording a growth of 4.15% over the previous fiscal. India exported $68.54 million worth of goods to El Salvador, and imported $6.18 million. The main commodities exported by India to El Salvador are pharmaceuticals, fabrics, organic chemicals, plastic and plastic articles. The major commodities imported by India from El Salvador are wood, wood products, iron and steel.

There have been several visits by trade and other delegations from El Salvador and India to each other's countries.

== Cultural relations ==
El Salvador purchased an elephant from India in 1955 for the Parque Zoologico Nacional de San Salvador, the national zoo in San Salvador. The Indian elephant, named Manhewla (from the Sanskrit name, Manjula), subsequently became a national icon and is the only elephant that has ever lived in El Salvador. Upon her death in January 2011, her body was kept for night for velacion, a benediction ceremony in El Salvador in which friends and relatives gather around the deceased and sing. Manhewla became the first animal to receive the honour of her own velacion.

The only Indian presence in El Salvador is a small number of nuns working with the Missionaries of Charity. As of December 2016, there were less than 12 Indians in El Salvador.

== Foreign aid ==
India donated ₹5 lakh (equivalent to ₹25 lakh or US$26,000 in 2026) worth of medicines to El Salvador in the aftermath Hurricane Mitch in 1998. Another $10,000 of medicines was donated in August 2005, and 18 Bajaj three-wheelers were donated in November 2005. The Government of India announced a $15 million line of credit for El Salvador in March 2007. India offered an additional $10 million line of credit during the India-SICA Foreign Minister level dialogue meeting in June 2008. However, as of December 2016, El Salvador has been unable to procure these lines of credit due to restrictions on borrowing imposed on the country by the IMF.

India and El Salvador an MoU to establish an IT Training Centre in San Salvador with Indian assistance in 2008. The Centre was opened in June 2008, and was operated by NIIT for the first two years. NIIT continued operations for a third year at the request of the Salvadoran Government, before handing over the Centre to El Salvador in June 2011.

India donated $250,000 to provide relief in the aftermath of Hurricane Ida in November 2009, and $100,000 in the aftermath of Tropical Depression 12-E in late 2011.

Under the ITEC programme, India sent Dr. Anitha Karun, principal scientist (horticulture) and an expert on tropical fruits, coconut & mango, worked with National Agricultural Research Centre of El Salvador in July–August 2013.

Citizens of El Salvador are eligible for scholarships under the Indian Technical and Economic Cooperation Programme and the Indian Council for Cultural Relations.

== See also ==
- Foreign relations of El Salvador
- Foreign relations of India
