= China–El Salvador relations =

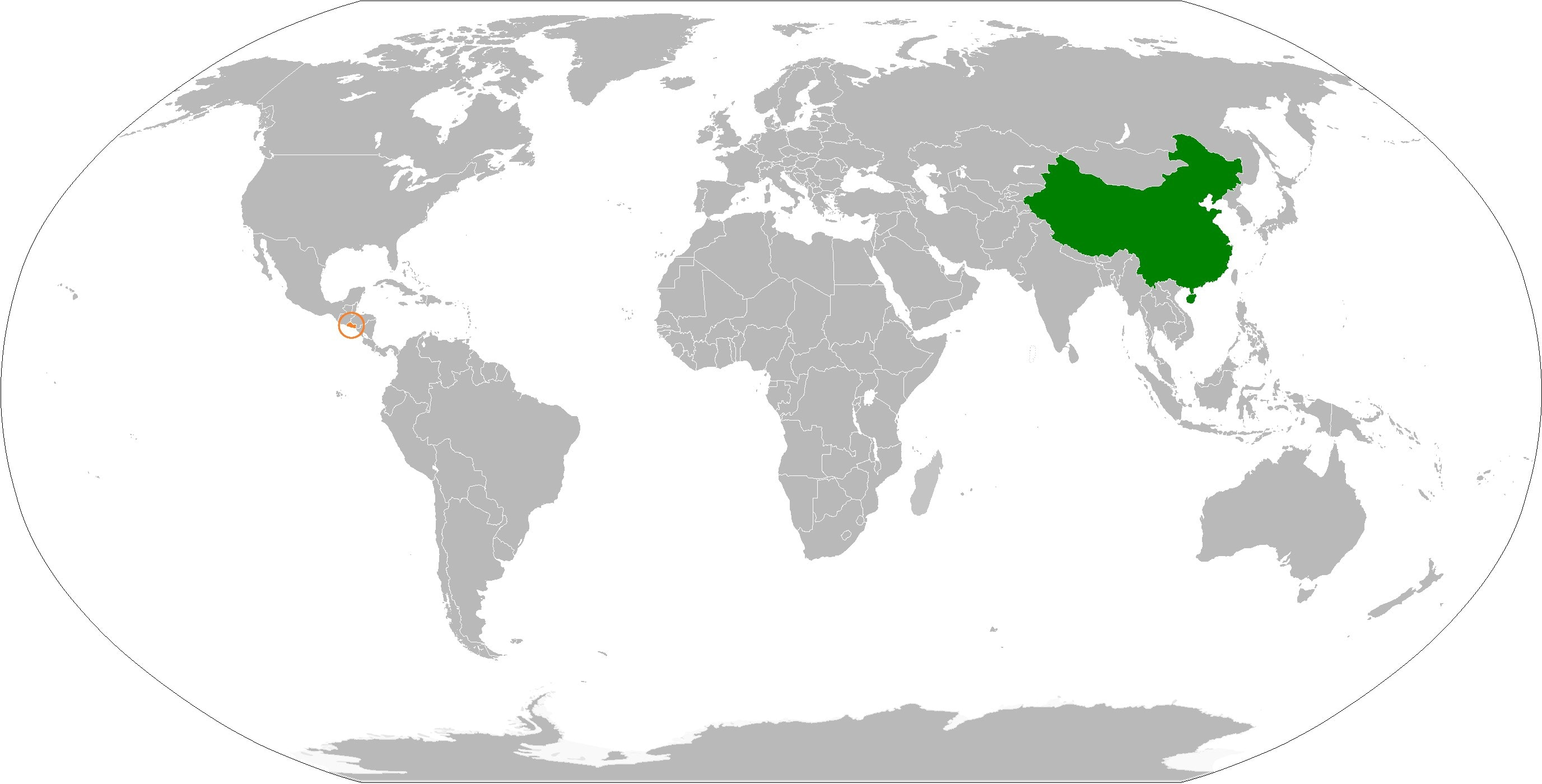

- China: El Salvador

The People's Republic of China (PRC) and Republic of El Salvador have maintained diplomatic relations since 2018. The PRC maintains an embassy in San Salvador and El Salvador maintains an embassy in Beijing.

== History ==
=== Republic of China ===
Diplomatic ties between the Republic of China and El Salvador were first established in 1933 when the Nationalist government held control of mainland China while Taiwan was part of the Empire of Japan.

=== People's Republic of China ===
El Salvador recognized the People's Republic of China in August 2018. China's State Councillor and Foreign Minister Wang Yi held talks with El Salvador Foreign Minister Carlos Castaneda. They signed a joint communique on the establishment of diplomatic relations, deciding to recognize each other and establish diplomatic relations at an ambassadorial level from the date of the communique's signing. The government of El Salvador severed diplomatic ties with Taiwan in 2018 during the administration of Salvador Sánchez Cerén under the Farabundo Martí National Liberation Front.

== Trade ==
China exported US$1.5 billion of goods to El Salvador and imported US$105 million in 2019. The major commodities exported by China to El Salvador are machinery, textiles, plastic and rubbers, and various miscellaneous items. The major commodities that El Salvador exports to China are electrical capacitors, raw sugar, and coffee. Between 1995 and 2019, exports from El Salvador to China have increased at an annualized rate of 14.7%, while exports from China to El Salvador have increased at an annualized rate of 16.6%.

== Development projects ==
El Salvador joined the Belt and Road Initiative (BRI) in 2018.

In 2018, Asia Pacific Xuanhao (APX), a Chinese state-owned company with links to the People's Liberation Army and People's Armed Police, announced a plan to lease land within and around the port at La Unión, particularly islands in the Gulf of Fonseca. The purpose of the lease remained undisclosed. However, some sources stated that it was to "build an electronic network to monitor communications and satellite movements in the hemisphere and particularly those of the United States." Salvadorean lawmakers passed a measure to prohibit the purchase of islands by foreigners in response. In 2021, the United States designated local officials assisting in the attempt to purchase the islands "corrupt and undemocratic actors" for acting as "agents of the People’s Republic of China in exchange for personal benefit."

Upon President of El Salvador Nayib Bukele's visit to China in 2019, he had signed a series of MoUs with General Secretary of the Chinese Communist Party Xi Jinping, in which China would promise El Salvador a total of US$500 million in development projects. These projects include a new national football stadium, a new US$40 million national library, a tourist pier in La Libertad and Ilopango, and US$200 million on the "Surf City" project, thereby involving El Salvador in China's Belt and Road Initiative.

Nayib Bukele announced on Twitter that a cooperation project granted by the People's Republic of China will have US$54 million new national library be built in El Salvador. The Salvadoran President later announced on 30 December 2021, that the 50,000-capacity Estadio Nacional de El Salvador will be built to replace Estadio Cuscatlán as El Salvador's national football stadium, at a cost of US$500 million, in collaboration with China.

=== Foreign aid ===
In 2019, China offered El Salvador around US$150 million in social projects and 3,000 tons of rice to thousands of Salvadorian victims to droughts.

The COVID-19 pandemic in El Salvador saw vaccine diplomacy increase between China and El Salvador. El Salvador received from China 150,000 vaccine doses of the CoronaVac vaccine donated by China, on top of 2 million Sinovac vaccines that the Central American nation had purchased.

== Culture ==
In November 2019, El Salvador permitted the opening of its first Confucius Institute at the University of El Salvador.
