= Australia–Chile relations =

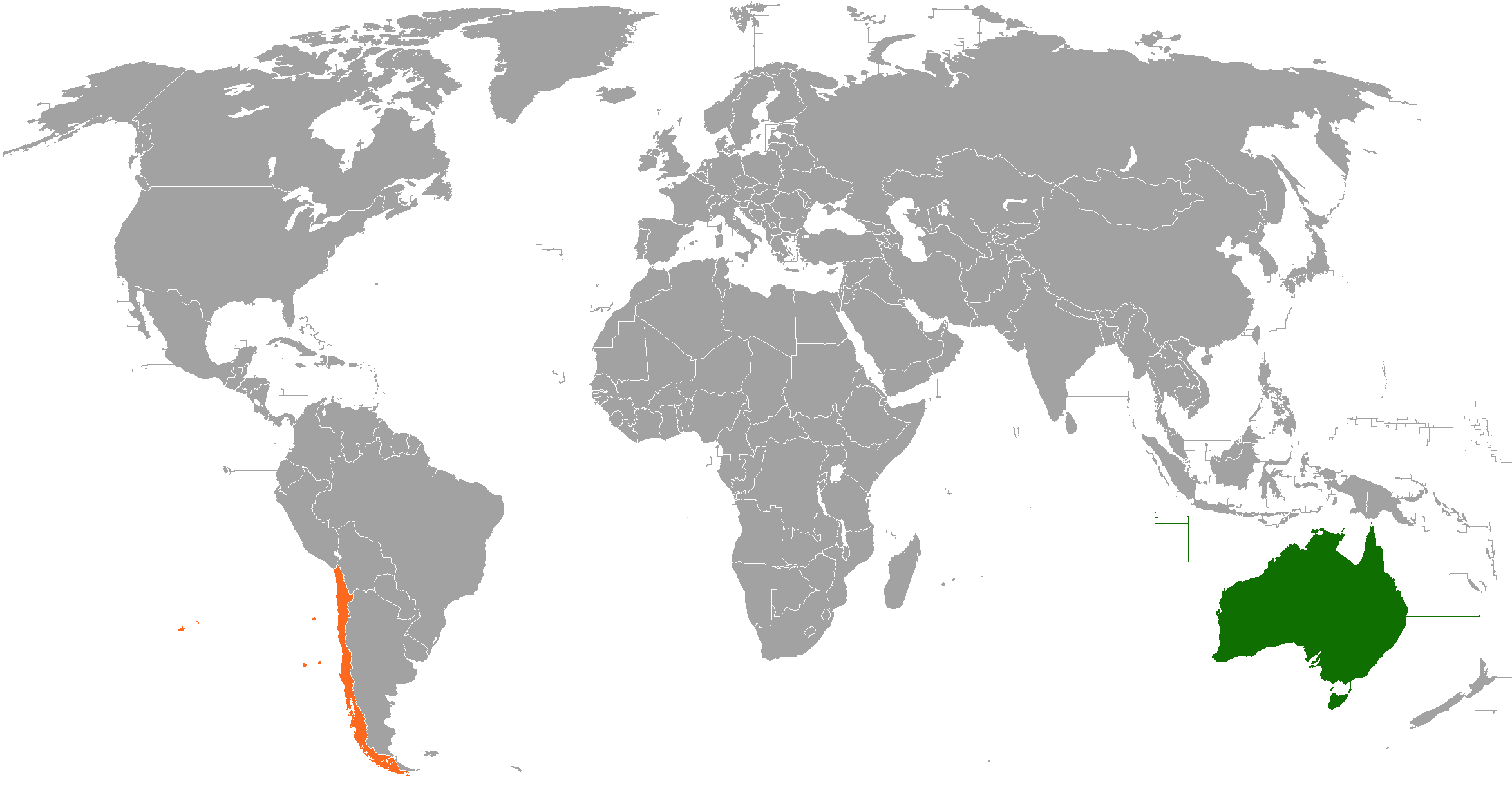

- Australia: Chile

Australia and Chile enjoy friendly relations, rooted in a history of Chilean immigration to Australia. As of 2016, over 26,000 Chilean-born individuals were living in Australia. Geographically, Chile is one of the closest countries in the Americas to Australia, and both nations administer several islands in the South Pacific.

They are also members of the Asia-Pacific Economic Cooperation, the Cairns Group, the Comprehensive and Progressive Agreement for Trans-Pacific Partnership, and the OECD. Since 2013, representatives from both countries have regularly participated in the annual South Pacific Defense Ministers' Meeting (SPDMM).

== History ==
As early as the nineteenth century, Australia and Chile maintained informal relations, as Australia was still part of the British Empire. The first known Chilean to arrive in Australia was former president and political exile General Ramón Freire, who arrived in 1838. Australia's third Prime Minister, Chris Watson was born in Valparaíso, Chile, in 1867 and later emigrated to Australia.

In 1899, Chile opened a consular office in Newcastle, New South Wales. Official diplomatic relations were established on 27 December 1945, and Chile subsequently upgraded its consular office to a diplomatic legation. In 1946, Australia opened a diplomatic legation in Santiago. Australia upgraded its legation to an embassy in 1968, and Chile reciprocated by upgrading its own legation to an embassy in 1969.

In the early twentieth century, Chileans began immigrating to Australia, with the 1901 census showing 90 Chilean nationals in the country. Migration increased in the 1970s following the 1973 Chilean coup d'état, when several thousand Chileans fled due to political persecution. After Chile returned to democracy, President Patricio Aylwin became the first Chilean head of state to pay an official visit to Australia in 1993. In 2004, Prime Minister John Howard became the first Australian head of government to visit Chile and attend the APEC Summit.

Both nations consider each other "like-minded" partners in multilateral forums. In 2015, Australia and Chile marked the 70th anniversary of diplomatic relations.

In 2022, Chilean state-run infrastructure fund Desarrollo País and H2 Cable, a subsidiary of Singapore's BW Digital, announced plans to seek a partner for the Humboldt Cable project, which will connect Chile to Australia. The two companies issued a request for proposals (RFP) for a strategic partner to supply and install the submarine cable system. The planned system would span roughly 15,000 kilometers, and connects Valparaiso, Chile, to Sydney, Australia, with provisions for branches to additional locations including the Juan Fernández Islands, Easter Island, New Zealand, and Antarctica. Cost estimates ranged from $450 million to $650 million at the time of the announcement.

== High-level visits ==
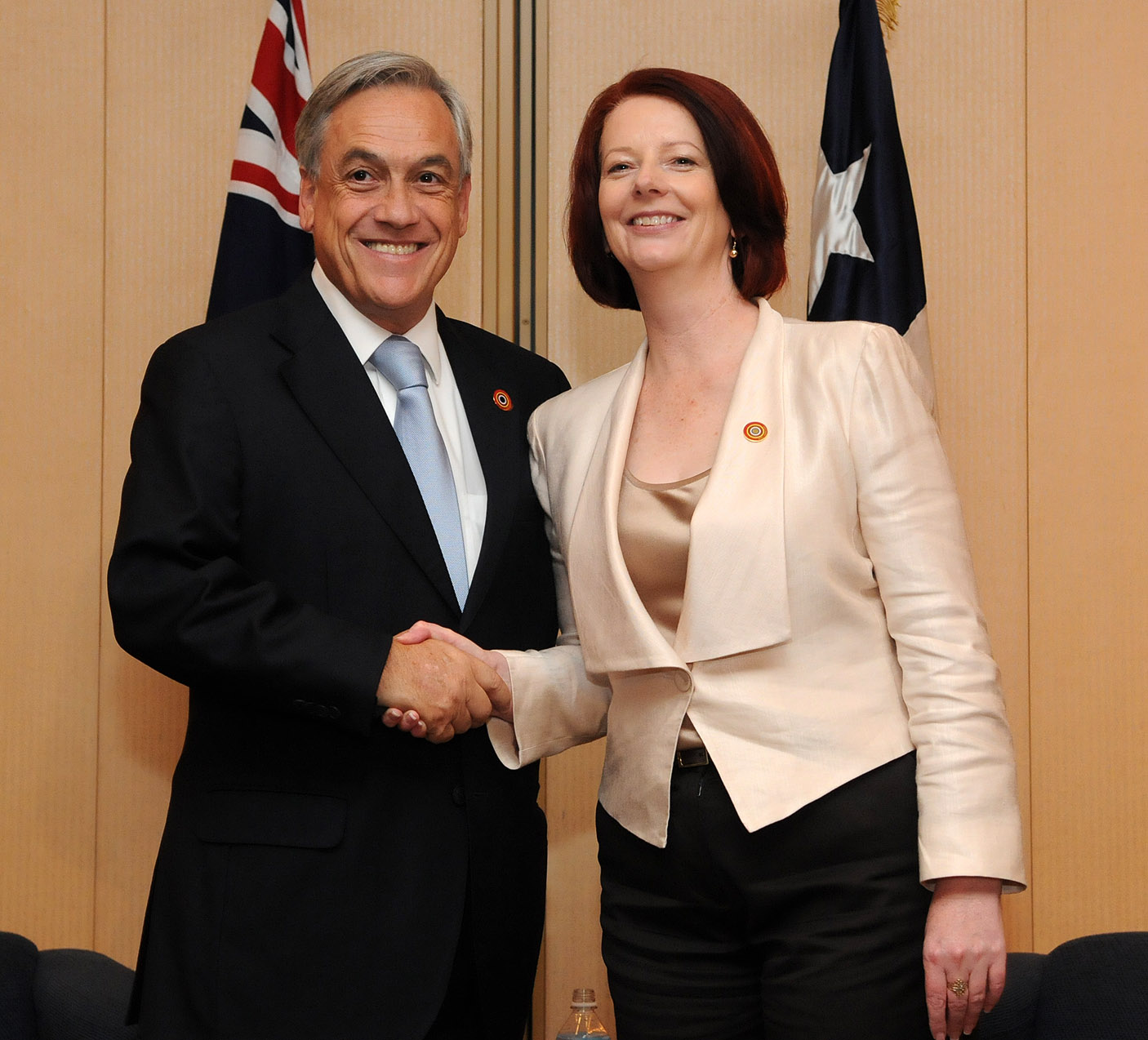
Australian Prime Minister Julia Gillard with Chilean President Sebastián Piñera meeting during the APEC summit in Yokohama, Japan; November 2010.

High-level visits from Australia to Chile

- Prime Minister John Howard (2004)
- Governor-General Peter Cosgrove (2016)

Presidential visits from Chile to Australia

- President Patricio Aylwin (1993)
- President Ricardo Lagos (2005)
- President Michelle Bachelet (2007)
- President Sebastián Piñera (2012)

== Bilateral Agreements ==
Both nations have signed several bilateral agreements, such as an Extradition Treaty (1996); Agreement on Reciprocal Promotion and Protection of Investments (1999); Agreement on Social Security (2004); Agreement on a work and holiday visa program (2005) and an Agreement on the avoidance of Double-Taxation (2013).

== Transportation ==
There are direct flights between Australia and Chile with the following airlines: LATAM Airlines (notably with Sydney-Santiago and Melbourne-Santiago routes) and Qantas (with the Sydney-Santiago route operational).

== Trade ==
In 2016, two-way trade between Australia and Chile totaled A$1.4 billion. Australia's main exports to Chile include coal, measuring and analysing instruments, specialized machinery and parts, and civil engineering equipment and parts. Chile's main exports to Australia include copper, fruit, wood, and ores and concentrates. In 2017, Australia launched free trade negotiations with Chile. Chile is Australia's third-largest trading partner in Latin America. Australia is the sixth largest foreign investor in Chile, with investments totaling over A$6.34 billion.

== Resident diplomatic missions ==
- Australia has an embassy in Santiago.
- Chile has an embassy in Canberra and consulates-general in Melbourne and Sydney.
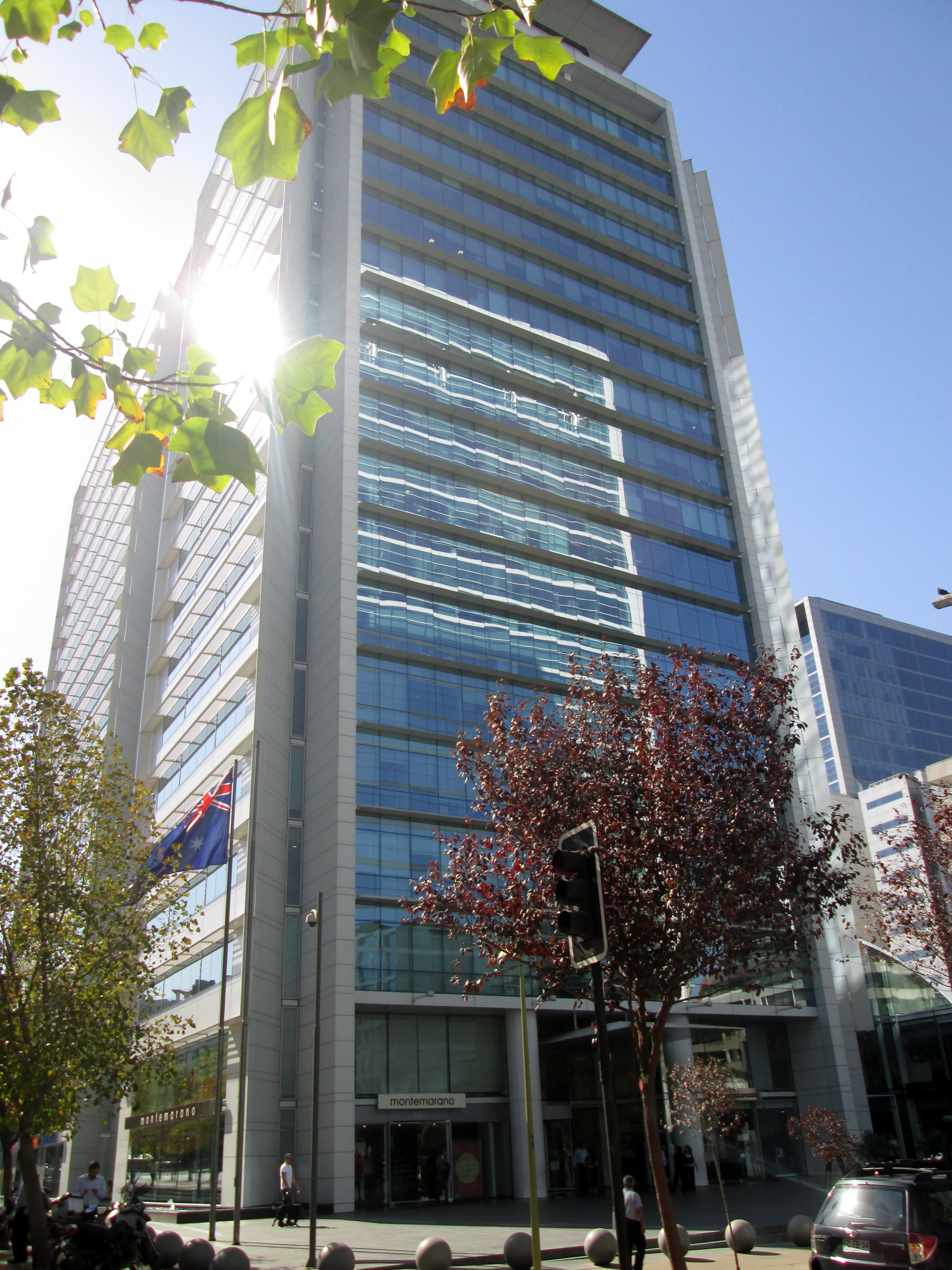
Embassy of Australia in Santiago

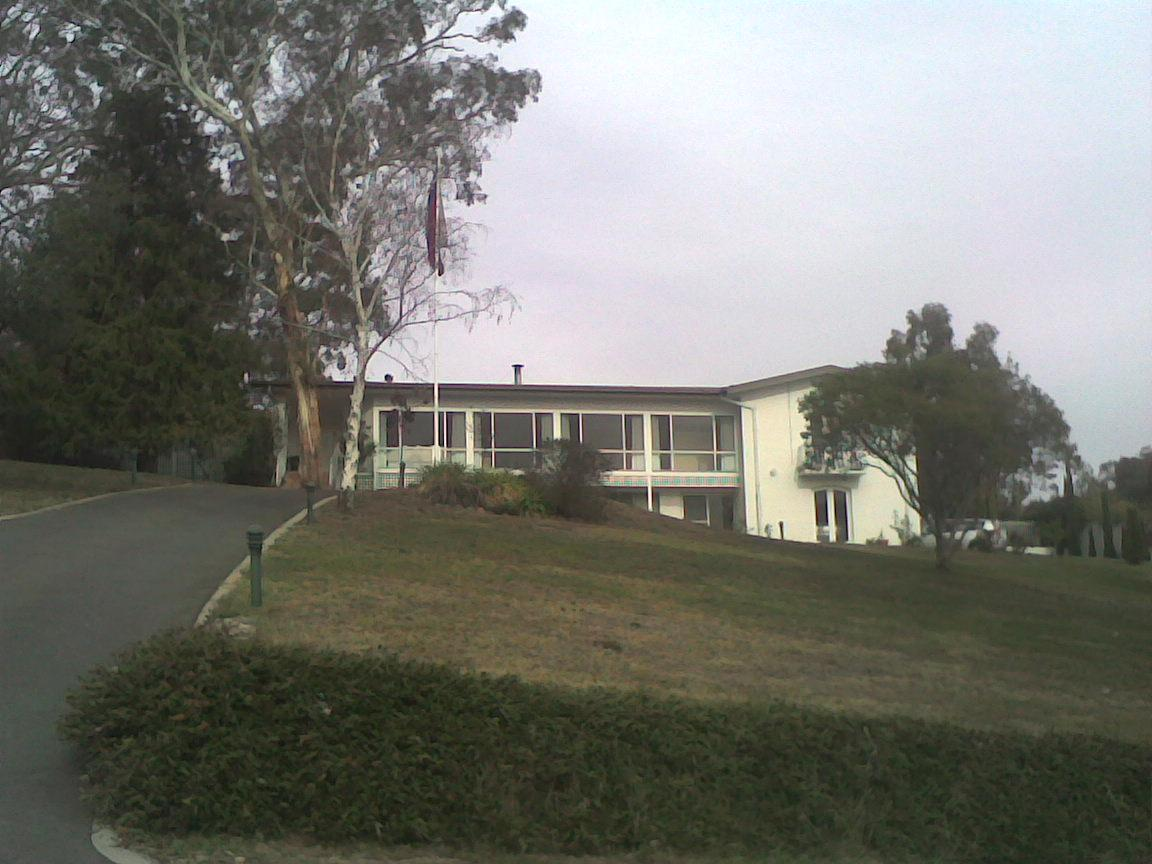
Embassy of Chile in Canberra

== See also ==
- Australia–Chile bilateral treaties
- Australia–Chile Free Trade Agreement
- Chilean Australians
