= Humboldt Cable =

Future submarine communications cable system

- Owners: Google, Chile
- Landing points Valparaíso, Chile; Sydney, Australia
- Total length: 14,800 km
- Date of first use: 2027 (expected)

Humboldt Cable is a planned fiber optic submarine communications cable that will connect Chile with Australia, becoming the first-ever link between South America and the Asia-Pacific region.

As of 2025, the plan is to build a 14,800-kilometre (9,200 mi) cable from Valparaiso, Chile, to Sydney, Australia, via French Polynesia.

== History ==
The proposal for a direct fiber-optic link between South America and Asia was introduced during Michelle Bachelet's second administration in Chile, between 2014 and 2016. In 2017, Chile's Undersecretariat of Telecommunications (Subtel), with support from the Development Bank of Latin America and the Caribbean (CAF), conducted a pre-feasibility study with China's Huawei, which identified three possible routes from Chile, all terminating in Shanghai: Auckland–Sydney–Shanghai, Tahiti–Shanghai, and Auckland–Shanghai. These studies identified the Valparaíso-Sydney route as the optimal option.

In 2018, Australia banned Huawei from participating in its planned 5G networks. In 2019, the Chilean government received political pressure from the United States, including a visit from US Secretary of State Mike Pompeo, to refrain from contracting Huawei for 5G technology, as part of a Washington campaign "against the Chinese company and the risk of Beijing collecting sensitive data."

In 2021, the Chilean stated-owned enterprise Desarrollo País assumed leadership of the project, launching an international request for proposals the following year to validate the updated system costs. Two years later, a memorandum of understanding was signed with Google, laying the foundation for the partnership.

Following the 2024 Leaders' Summit of the Americas Partnership for Economic Prosperity, held in the United States, the partnership was first announced by the Chilean government in January 2024. it stated that the cable would have a capacity of 144 terabytes per second and a lifespan of 25 years. In June 2025, Chile and Google signed an agreement to install the submarine fiber-optic cable. Operations are expected to begin in 2027.

== Investment and ownership ==
As of June 2025, Google has invested between $300 million and $550 million in the project, while the Chilean government had committed $25 million. Desarrollo País and Google will each hold a 50% stake in the joint venture.

Among the benefits, the cable promises more robust and stable internet connections, as well as efficient exchange of scientific data between South America and the Asia-Pacific region. Latin American governments—including Argentina, Paraguay and Brazil— have also expressed interest in participating in the initial phase of the project.

== Proposed landing points ==
1. Valparaíso, Chile
2. French Polynesia
3. Sydney, Australia
