= Australia–Chile bilateral treaties =

The following is a list of international bilateral treaties between Australia and Chile

- Early treaties were extended to Australia by the British Empire, however they are still generally in force.

Entry into force	Topic	Title	Ref
1897	Extradition	Treaty between the United Kingdom of Great Britain and Ireland and Chile for the Mutual Surrender of Fugitive Criminals (Santiago, 26 January 1897)	
1919	Arbitration	Treaty between the United Kingdom of Great Britain and Ireland and Chile for the Establishment of a Peace Commission	
1928	Extradition	Exchange of Notes between the Government of the United Kingdom of Great Britain and Northern Ireland (and on behalf of Australia, New Zealand and South Africa) and the Government of Chile extending to Certain Mandated Territories the Treaty for the Mutual Surrender of Fugitive Criminals of 26 January 1897	
1996	Extradition	Treaty on Extradition between Australia and the Republic of Chile	
1999	Consular	Agreement between the Government of Australia and the Government of the Republic of Chile on Gainful Employment of Dependants of Diplomatic and Consular Personnel	
1999	Civil law	Agreement between the Government of Australia and the Government of the Republic of Chile on the Reciprocal Promotion and Protection of Investments, and Protocol	
2004	Social security	Agreement on Social Security between the Government of Australia and the Government of the Republic of Chile (Canberra, 25 March 2003)	
2005	Trade	Agreement Between the Government of Australia and the Government of the Republic of Chile Relating to Air Services (Santiago, 7 September 2001)	
2009	Trade	Australia-Chile Free Trade Agreement (Canberra, 30 July 2008)	
2013	Taxation	Convention Between Australia and the Republic of Chile for the Avoidance of Double Taxation with Respect to Taxes on Income and Fringe Benefits and the Prevention of Fiscal Evasion (Santiago, 10 March 2010)	
2015	Trade	Amendment to Annex 15A (Government Procurement) of the Australia-Chile Free Trade Agreement (Santiago, 11 December 2014)	
