= Australia–Germany relations =

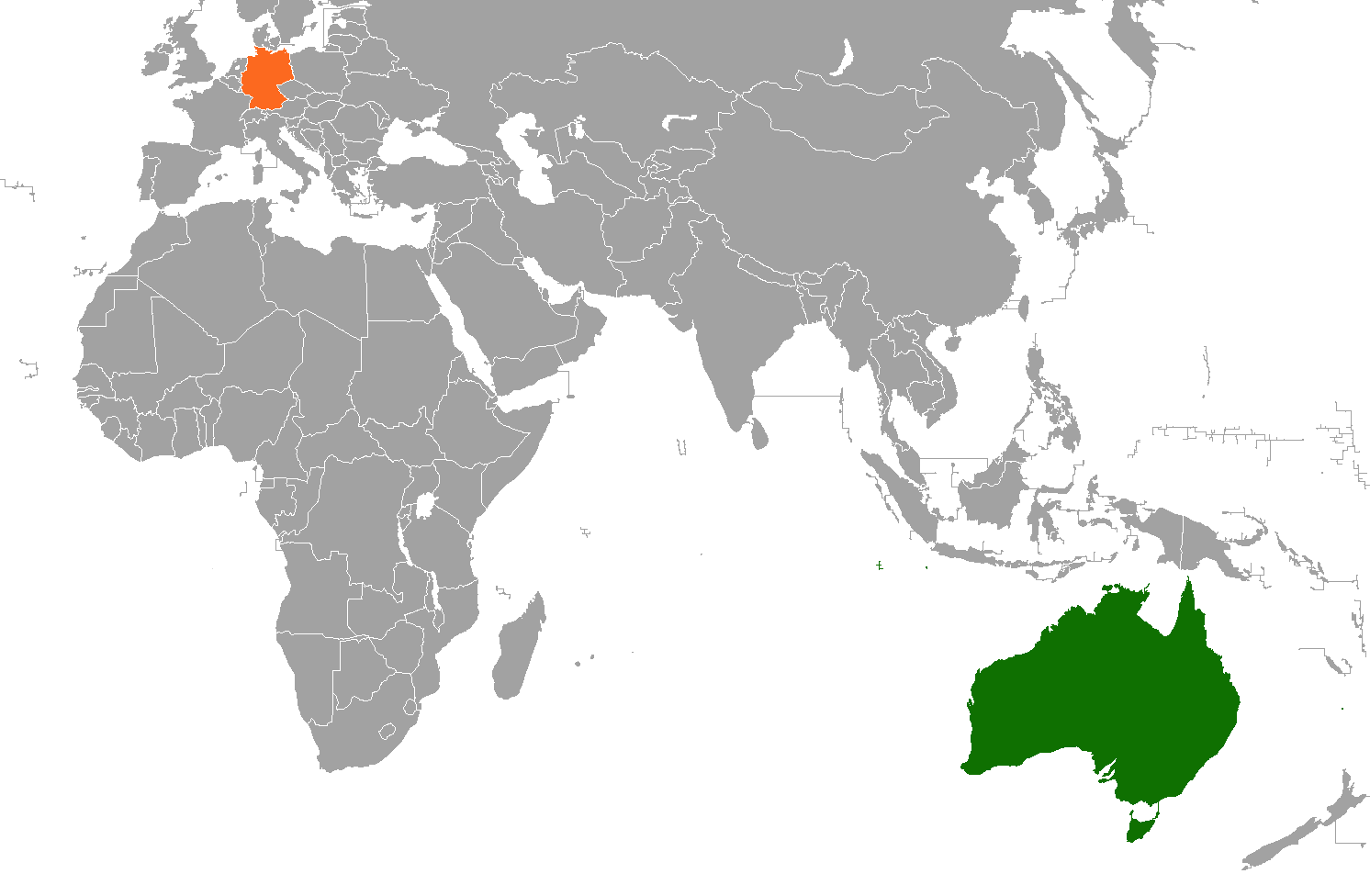

- Australia: Germany

Diplomatic mission
- Australian Embassy in Berlin: Embassy of Germany, Canberra

Envoy
- Ambassador Philip Green: Ambassador Beate Grzeski

Australia–Germany relations are the historical and bilateral relations between the Commonwealth of Australia and the Federal Republic of Germany, both nations shared values of democracy and human rights, substantial commercial links, and a keen interest in each other's culture. As part of a strategic partnership concluded in 2013, both nations are also increasingly cooperating on security policy issues. Both countries also maintain diplomatic relations in each other's countries.

In December 2001, Australian Department of Foreign Affairs estimated that there were 15,000 Australian citizens resident in Germany. There were many German missionaries who emigrated to Australia, established mission stations and worked with Aboriginal Australians, in some cases helping to preserve their languages and culture.

== History ==
=== New Guinea ===
An early collision of Australian and German interests dates to the early 1880s, as both the German Empire and the elites of the United Kingdom's Australian colonies were interested in exploiting the resources of the island of New Guinea. Eventually, the north-eastern quarter of the island became a German protectorate in 1884 (German New Guinea), while Queensland annexed the southeastern quarter of the island to the British Empire in 1883. In 1902–1905, soon after the formation of the Commonwealth of Australia, this Territory of Papua was formally transferred under the Australian administration. Thus a land border between German and Australian colonial possessions came into existence, at least as a line on world maps. In practice, however, there was little if any colonial presence in the interior of the island, and the border remained mostly unsurveyed.

=== Two World Wars ===
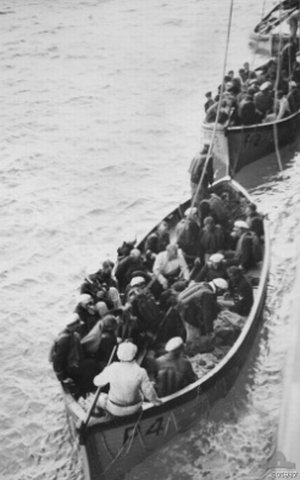
Lifeboats with some of the survivors from German auxiliary cruiser Kormoran towed to Carnarvon, Western Australia, by the freigher Centaur. HMAS Sydney was lost with all hands.

As a member of the British Empire, Australia found itself at war with Germany in both World War I (1914–1918) and World War II (1939–1945). Although the two countries are widely geographically separated, both wars involved some direct encounters between the two countries' militaries. Although Australians' best-remembered operation in World War I, the Gallipoli Campaign, was fought against the Ottoman Empire, many Australian units faced Germans on the Western Front, while the small Australian Naval and Military Expeditionary Force fought Germans in the Pacific.

At the conclusion of the war, an Australian delegation participated in the negotiating of the Treaty of Versailles, codifying the partitioning of the former German Empire among the winners. The Treaty of Versailles became the first international treaty signed by Australian representatives. Australian Prime Minister Billy Hughes forcibly pressed for high German reparations payments and Article 231 assigning it guilt for the conflict so that the British Empire and Dominions could benefit from the payments, despite opposition from the United States. Pursuant to the treaty, the former German New Guinea became Territory of New Guinea, administered by Australia under a League of Nations mandate. The remote isolated island of Nauru, which formerly had been administratively part of the German New Guinea, became a separate mandate territory – theoretically, under jointly administration of Australia, New Zealand, and the United Kingdom, but de facto run primarily by Australians.

In World War II, Australia was one of the first countries to declare war on Germany, on 3 September 1939, the third day of the German invasion of Poland. The Battle between HMAS Sydney and German auxiliary cruiser Kormoran in November 1941 resulted in the sinking of both ships; the Western Desert Campaign, including the Siege of Tobruk was an important land campaign with major German and Australian participation.

During both wars, German enemy aliens found in Australia at the outbreak of the war, were interned. Internee and PoW camps throughout Australia also housed a number of German sailors (from both the merchant marine and the navy), as well as German prisoners of wars brought from other theaters (primarily, north Africa).

=== Diplomatic history ===
The German Empire opened a consulate in Sydney in the late 19th century. The German consul, Carl Ludwig Sahl (1840–1897), who spent most of his life in the South Pacific region, received his acceptance by British authorities on October 18, 1872; he served in Sydney until his death in 1897, and was buried there.

After the First World War, the first consul of the Weimar Republic, Dr Hans Büsing, arrived to Australia in 1924.

Diplomatic relations between Australia and the Federal Republic of Germany started soon after the creation of the latter. In 1949, an Australian mission was established in Bonn, accredited to the Allied High Commission (the occupation government). In 1952, the mission was converted to an Australian embassy accredited to the FRG government. Diplomatic relations with the German Democratic Republic were established by the Whitlam government in 1973 (see below for more).

=== Relations with the GDR ===
For about 27 years after the collapse of Nazi Germany, the Australian government refused to recognise East Germany or accept East German passports, due to ideological and political reasons; Australia viewing the GDR as a satellite state aligned and heavily influenced by the Soviet Union, while the GDR viewed Australia as a product of British colonialism, intent on destroying Marxism–Leninism. There were small trade relations and low-level visits though, which went unnoticed by the governments.

It wasn't until 1972, when, after a Labor victory led by Gough Whitlam, the government then considered recognition of the GDR. After some negotiations between the two governments, the Australian government finally recognised the GDR the following year. An embassy was built in the "diplomatic quarter" of East Berlin at Grabbeallee 34. Following German reunification in 1990, the embassy (along with the other one in Bonn) was closed.

=== European Union ===
Germany was a founding member of the European Union (EU). The EU and Australia have solid relations and increasingly see eye-to-eye on international issues. The EU-Australian relations are founded on a Partnership Framework, first agreed in 2008. It covers not just economic relations, but broader political issues and cooperation. Since 2025, there have been discussions about integrating the EU with the CPTPP, a Pacific Rim free trade agreement which includes medium sized economies such as Australia, Canada, Japan and Mexico, but not China and the United States. Such a deal would align with the EU's pivot away from US dependency, and towards stronger alliances with middle powers.

=== Diplomatic Visits ===
Chancellor Angela Merkel conducted a significant visit to Australia in November 2014, attending the G20 Summit in Brisbane and delivering a keynote address at the Lowy Institute in Sydney. Earlier that month, President Frank-Walter Steinmeier undertook a state visit to Sydney and Perth, which marked the first visit by a German President to Australia in sixteen years. During this trip, Steinmeier addressed the Asia-Pacific Regional Conference and engaged in dialogue regarding migration policies and economic cooperation between the two nations. Australian Prime Minister Malcolm Turnbull visited Berlin in November 2015. in February 2026, German Foreign Minister Johann Wadephul traveled to Canberra to meet with Australian Foreign Minister Penny Wong. This was part of a diplomatic tour of the Western Pacific area by Wadephul, which also included visits to Brunei, New Zealand, Singapore and Tonga. Topics discussed in Australia included the potential EU-CPTPP alignment, and the importance of middle power diplomacy. In March 2026, German Defence Minister Boris Pistorius visited Australia, Japan and Singapore.

== Trade ==
Trade between the two countries is sizable but heavily weighted to imports from Germany. In 2008, total two-way merchandise trade was valued at over A$13.4 billion, of which A$11.4 billion (85 per cent) were imports from Germany.

Monthly value of Australian merchandise exports to Germany (A$ millions) since 1988

Monthly value of German merchandise exports to Australia (A$ millions) since 1988

Monthly short term travel departures from Australia to Germany since 1991

== Treaties ==
A significant number of Australia–Germany bilateral treaties include agreements on trade, science, space, taxation/social security, extradition, and other matters.

== Multilateral organizations ==
Both nations are members of the United Nations, Organisation for Economic Co-operation and Development, G20 major economies, World Trade Organization, and among others.

== Resident diplomatic missions ==
- Australia has an embassy in Berlin and a consulate-general in Frankfurt.
- Germany has an embassy in Canberra and a consulate-general in Sydney.
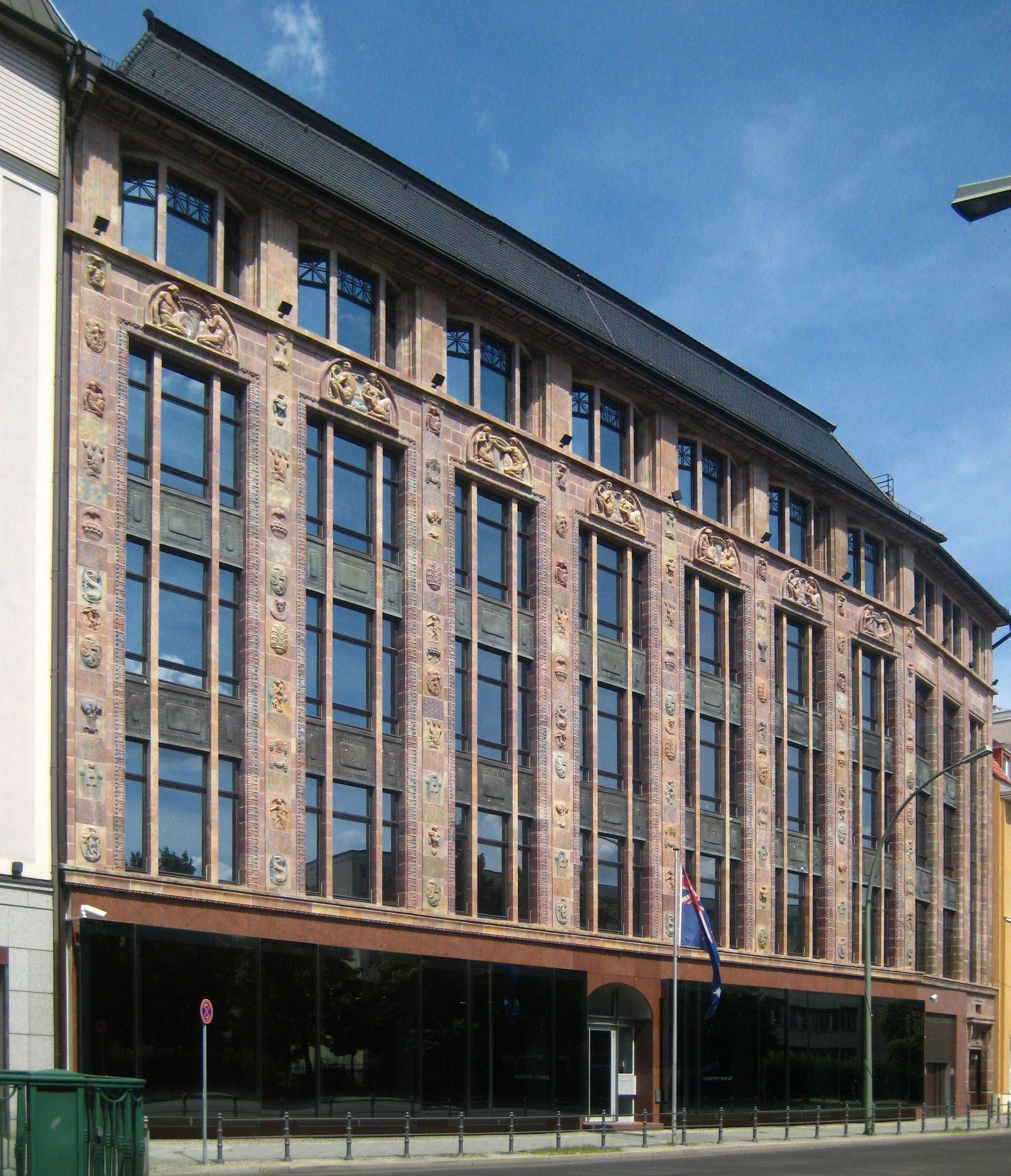
Embassy of Australia in Berlin

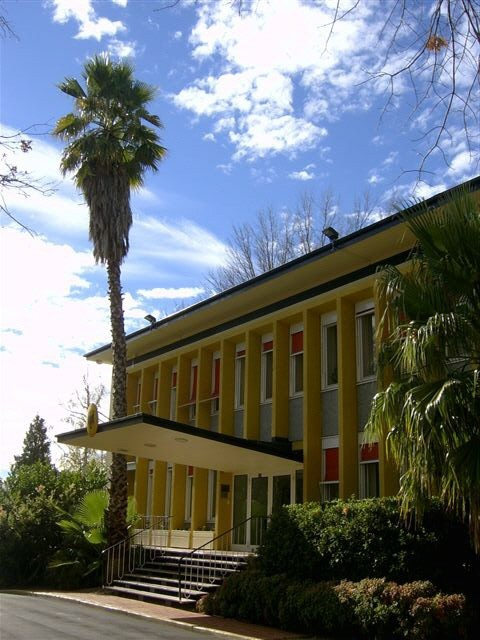
Embassy of Germany in Canberra

== See also ==
- Foreign relations of Germany
- Foreign relations of Australia
- German Australian
