= Australia–European Union relations =

- European Union: Australia

Relations between the Commonwealth of Australia and the European Union (EU) are founded on a Partnership Framework, first agreed in 2008. It covers not just economic relations, but broader political issues and cooperation.

The Australian Government maintains a delegation to the EU at its embassy in Brussels. A Delegation of the European Union is located in Canberra.

== History ==
Australia's relationship with Europe is a result of the historical connections generated by colonialism and mass European immigration to Australia. Possible first sightings of mainland Australia by Portugal and Spain have been theorized. However, the first documented European landings occurred since March 1606 by Holland. Australia would later be explored and conquered between the 18th and 19th centuries by the British Empire.

In March 2026, Australia and the European Union announced a free trade agreement worth approximately A$10 billion. Negotiations for the agreement began in 2018 and collapsed in October 2023; they were restarted in 2026. A defence partnership was also announced. In March 2026, no starting date for the agreement had been announced. A draft will be released, translated, and submitted to the Council of the European Union and Australia's Federal Executive Council and signed later in 2026 or 2027, while up to a year of scrutiny will enable their official passage by the European Parliament and Australian Parliament.

== Trade ==
Monthly value of Australian merchandise exports to the European Union (A$ millions) since 1988

Monthly value of EU merchandise exports to Australia (A$ millions) since 1988

The EU is Australia's second largest trading partner, after China, and Australia is the EU's 18th. Australia's exports are dominated by mineral and agricultural goods, while 39% of trade is in commercial services, especially transportation and travel. EU corporations have a strong presence in Australia (approximately 2360) with an estimated turnover of €200 bn (just over 14% of total sales in Australia). These companies directly created 500,000 jobs in Australia. The EU is Australia's second largest destination of overseas investment and the EU is by far Australia's largest source of foreign investment €2.9 billion in 2009 (€11.6 billion in 2007). Trade was growing but ebbed in 2009 due to the 2008 financial crisis. In August 2019, Australian Senator Simon Birmingham, released a list of names that the EU wants to protect as a part of its new trade deal. The list of proposed names included beers, spirits and cheese and meats, which as per EU is aimed at protecting the identity of European products from non-European products. This concept of segregation is known as “geographical indications” or Gis, which will change the name of commodity in regards to the country of its origin.

EU – Australia trade in 2009
Direction of trade	Australian Dollars		Euros	
Direction of trade	Goods	Services	Goods	Services
EU to Australia	42.5 billion	18.8 billion	26.7 billion	99.8 billion
Australia to EU	15.6 billion	9.8 billion		6.2 billion

== Australia's foreign relations with EU member states ==
- Austria
- Belgium
- Bulgaria
- Croatia
- Cyprus
- Czech Republic
- Denmark
- Estonia
- Finland
- France
- Germany
- Greece
- Hungary
- (Republic of Ireland) Ireland
- Italy
- Latvia
- Lithuania
- Luxembourg
- Malta
- Netherlands
- Poland
- Portugal
- Romania
- Slovakia
- Slovenia
- Spain
- Sweden

== See also ==
- Foreign relations of Australia
- Foreign relations of the European Union
