= Bulgarian Australians =

Bulgarian Australians Австралийски българи
Total population
- 3,718 (by place of birth, 2021); 8,039 (by ancestry, 2021)

Regions with significant populations
- New South Wales, Victoria, Queensland, South Australia

Languages
- Australian English, Bulgarian

Religion
- Bulgarian Orthodox Church

Related ethnic groups
- Bulgarians, Greek Australians, Macedonian Australians, Serbian Australians

Bulgarian Australians (Bulgarian: австралийски българи, avstraliyski balgari) are Australian citizens of Bulgarian ancestry. According to the 2006 Australian census, 2,680 residents of Australia were born in Bulgaria. Of these, 850 lived in New South Wales, 840 in Victoria, 340 in Queensland and 340 in South Australia. Some 4,870 people indicated full or partial Bulgarian ancestry.

== History ==
The first traces of Bulgarian emigration to Australia date back to 1876, when an unknown number of Bulgarians fleeing the Ottoman atrocities in the wake of the April Uprising settled in Queensland and Tasmania. According to 1891 statistics, only 14 Bulgarians lived in Australia. Following the anti-Ottoman Ilinden–Preobrazhenie Uprising of 1908, around 100 Bulgarians from Macedonia and southern Thrace emigrated to Australia. The first more prominent Bulgarian colony was formed in Perth, Western Australia, in 1906–07.

The first larger organized group of Bulgarian emigrants arrived in Australia in 1907 and consisted of around 100 people, most from the Veliko Tarnovo region; 30 of these disembarked in Adelaide, South Australia, 35 in Melbourne, Victoria and 35 in Sydney, New South Wales. In 1912, Bulgarian gardeners bought out the swampy lands of Fulham near Adelaide and turned these into fruit gardens. The Bulgarian colony in Adelaide was among the fastest-growing Bulgarian colonies in Australia; many settlers from the villages near Veliko Tarnovo arrived in the 1920s to work in the city as gardeners. The Bulgarian community in Melbourne was established in 1910–1911.

After the end of World War II, there was an influx of hundreds of Bulgarian political emigrants who did not accept the newly established communist authority in Bulgaria. It is difficult to establish the exact number of Bulgarian settlers in the pre-World War II period, but one estimate puts the number of emigrants from the Kingdom of Bulgaria at 1,000, with another 5,000 to 6,000 ethnic Bulgarian emigrants from Macedonia, Dobruja and Bessarabia.

It was not until 1950 that Bulgarian Orthodox church communities were officially established. The Bulgarian Orthodox churches in Australia are part of the Bulgarian Eastern Orthodox Diocese of the USA, Canada and Australia. Today, there are three Bulgarian Orthodox churches in Australia: the Saint John of Rila Bulgarian Eastern Orthodox Church in Macquarie Fields, Sydney, the Saint Petka Bulgarian Eastern Orthodox Church in Adelaide, and the Saints Cyril and Methodius Bulgarian Eastern Orthodox Cathedral in Melbourne.

== Notable people ==
- Iwan Iwanoff (1919–1986), architect
- Yull Brown (1959–2003), Electrical Engineer, Inventor
- Anelia Pavlova (Annael) (b. 1956), artist
- Nik Radev (1959–2003), criminal
- Martin Marinov (b. 1967), canoer
- Nik Kosef (b. 1974), Rugby League player
- Katrin Aladjova (b. 1971), chess player
- Annie Ivanova (b. 1971), curator
- Sarah Blasko (b. 1976), musician

== See also ==
- Australia–Bulgaria relations
- Bulgarian Eastern Orthodox Diocese of the USA, Canada and Australia
- Bulgarian diaspora
- Bulgarians
- European Australians
- Europeans in Oceania
- Immigration to Australia
