= Anela (name) =

Given name

Anela a given name.

- Anela Choy, American oceanographer
- Anela Lubina, Crotian footballer

== See also ==
- Aneliya
