= SS Mareeba =

Australian cargo ship sunk in 1941

Coordinates: 8°15′N 88°06′E

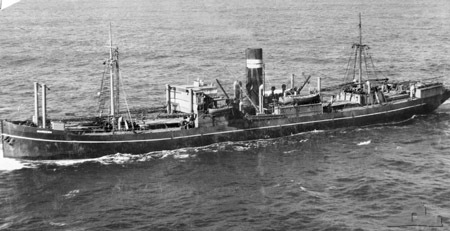
- Aerial view of Mareeba

History

Australia
- Name: 1921: Echuca; 1924: Mareeba
- Owner: 1921: Commonwealth Line; 1924: Australasian United SN Co
- Port of registry: Melbourne
- Builder: Walkers Ltd, Maryborough
- Launched: 6 July 1921
- Completed: November 1921
- Identification: UK official number 132479; until 1933: code letters THRP; by 1930: call sign VJGF
- Fate: sunk 26 June 1941

General characteristics
- Type: cargo ship
- Tonnage: 3,362 GRT, 1,924 NRT
- Length: 332.7 ft (101.4 m)
- Beam: 47.1 ft (14.4 m)
- Draught: 23 ft 10 in (7.3 m)
- Depth: 27.1 ft (8.3 m)
- Decks: 1
- Installed power: 520 NHP
- Propulsion: 1 × triple-expansion engine; 1 × screw
- Crew: 48

SS Mareeba was an Australian cargo steamship that was built in 1921 for the Commonwealth Line as Echuca, named after the town of Echuca in the state of Victoria. In 1924 the Australasian United Steam Navigation Company bought her and renamed her after the town of Mareeba, Queensland.

== Loss ==
On 26 June 1941 the German auxiliary cruiser Kormoran sank her in the Bay of Bengal in the Indian Ocean. She was carrying 5000 tons of sugar from Batavia to Colombo when she picked up the Yugoslav cargo ship Velebit's distress signal. Instead of immediately stopping, Mareeba radioed her position and tried to escape, presumably because at 08:00 hrs that morning she had spotted the Royal Navy light cruiser HMS Durban in the Ten Degree Channel. Nine shells hit her hull, several of them in her engine-room. She was sinking only slowly, so a German boarding party scuttled her with explosive charges to sink her quickly. It was later said that Mareeba would have made a fine auxiliary minelayer because of her durability.

== Crew ==
All 48 of Mareeba's crew became prisoners of war and were taken away aboard Kormoran, which sailed at top speed through the night and most of the next day to avoid retaliation for the sinkings.

The captured crew stayed aboard Kormoran for a total of 103 days, where they were housed in the fore part of the ship below the waterline. They slept in hammocks and were allowed on deck daily. After 103 days they were transferred to the German supply ship Kulmerland. After another 15 days they were transferred to the German cargo ship Spreewald.

== Bibliography ==
- Lloyd's Register of Shipping. Vol. II.–Steamers and Motor Vessels. London: Lloyd's Register of Shipping. 1922 – via Internet Archive.
- Lloyd's Register of Shipping. Vol. II.–Steamers and Motorships. London: Lloyd's Register of Shipping. 1924 – via Internet Archive.
- Lloyd's Register of Shipping (PDF). Vol. II.–Steamers and Motorships of 300 tons gross and over. London: Lloyd's Register of Shipping. 1934 – via Southampton City Council.
- Mercantile Navy List. London. 1930 – via Crew List Index Project.
