= Annie Ivanova =

International curator, author, cultural diplomat, and entrepreneur (born in Bulgaria)

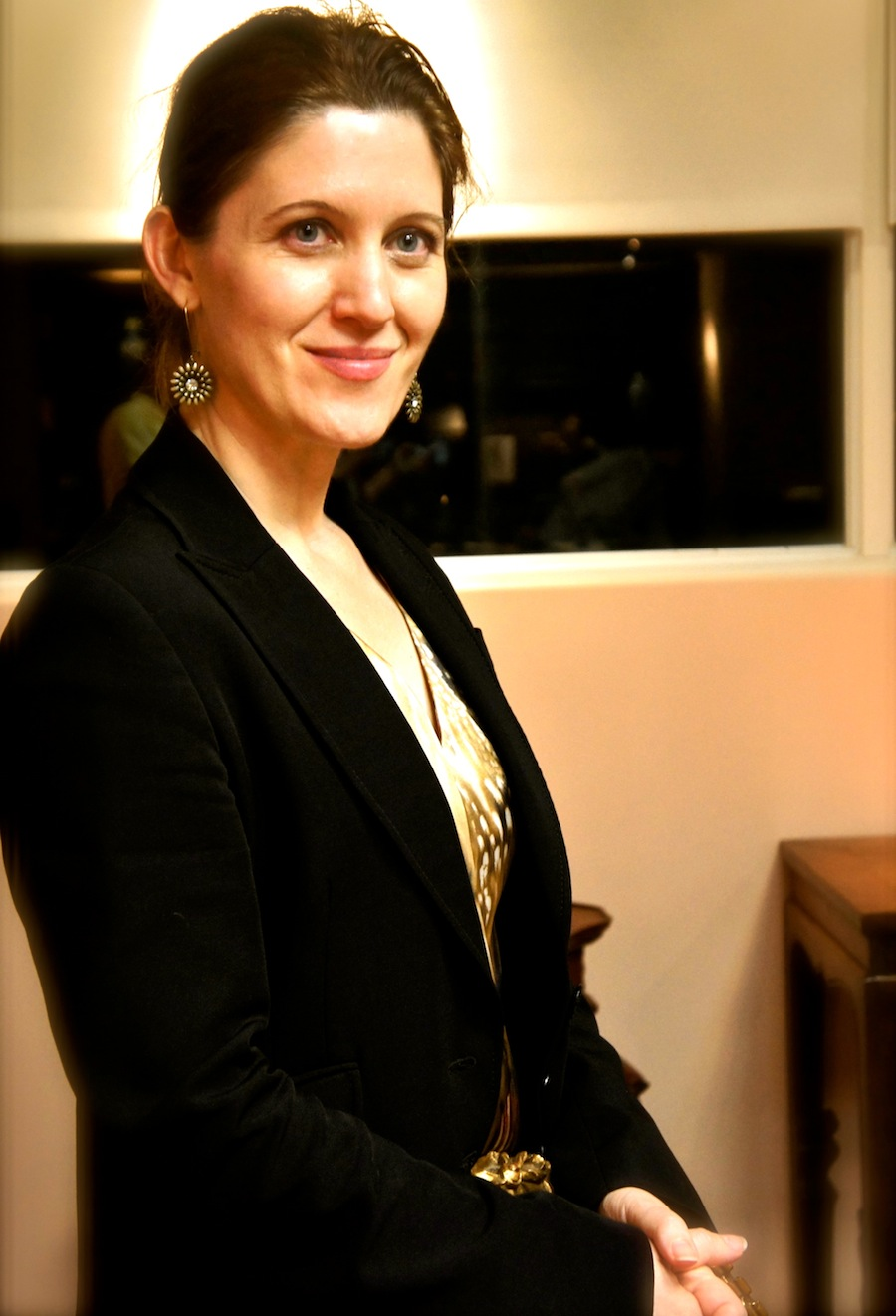
- Ivanova 2013, Taipei
- Born: Antoanetta Ivanova (Антоанета 易安妮); Tryavna, Bulgaria
- Education: Monash University
- Occupations: Cultural ambassador, curator
- Years active: 1996–present

Antoanetta "Annie" Ivanova (Bulgarian: Антоанета Иванова; Chinese Traditional: 易安妮 Yì Ānnī) is an Australian curator, author, and entrepreneur.

== Education ==
In the late 1980s, Ivanova studied at the Bulgarian National College of Polygraphs and Photography, majoring in photography and specialising in photojournalism.

Ivanova graduated from the University of Tasmania with a Bachelor of Fine Arts (BFA Hons.) in 1998. Ivanova holds an MA in Foreign Affairs and International Trade from Monash University, Graduate School of Business and Economics in Melbourne.

== Career ==
Ivanova is a Member of the Australian Institute of Company Directors and Australian Institute of International Affairs. She has chaired and produced major international conferences, and has been a keynote speaker on Culture & Creative Industries topics.

Ivanova co-founded and served as executive director of the media arts agency Novamedia Ltd.

In 2012, Australia Unlimited featured Ivanova's exhibition 'Wonderland: New Contemporary Art from Australia' at MOCATaipei.

Ivanova is reported to be the first foreign curator to work with the Taiwanese aborigines, travelling to remote communities to work with artists from every tribe. She has advocated for the preservation of local indigenous heritage. Her work was recognized in the inaugural Australian Arts in Asia Awards.

In recognition of her cultural work in Taiwan, Ivanova received a scholarship from the Taiwanese government to undertake Chinese Language studies at the Mandarin Training Centre of National Taiwan Normal University in Taipei.

In 2016, Ivanova became the first cultural representative to receive the ANZ Chamber of Commerce Business Award for "outstanding contribution to the Australia-Taiwan Relationship". She is also the Regional President of Asia Designer Communication Platform, which promotes designers' work and has held events in cities within Asia. Ivanova is the author of "Taiwan by Design: 88 products for better living." The project took two and a half years to complete and a crowdfunding campaign raised NT 1,500,000.

== Personal life ==
Annie Ivanova was born in Tryavna, Bulgaria. Her father was an industrial designer, and her mother was a drama teacher. During the 1989 revolution, Ivanova worked as a junior reporter, assisting Reuters photographer Oleg Popov. After witnessing the events leading to the collapse of communism in Sofia, she moved to Great Britain, where she studied design at the London College of Fashion.

Ivanova moved to Australia in 1994 and identifies as an Australian of Bulgarian heritage.

Since 2010, she has lived between Sydney and Taipei. Her Chinese name, 易安妮 (Yì Ānnī), was given to her by a friend and is reportedly taken from the I-Ching "Book of Changes."

== Significant exhibitions ==
Date	Museum	Exhibition	Notes
2018	AUSTRALIAN DESIGN CENTRE	LET's TEA PARTY: Taiwan in Design	International Exhibition
2017	ART TAIPEI 2017	GLOBAL PUBLICS	International Exhibition
2016	Home Hotel	Living with Design	Taiwan Design Exhibition
2014	Taipei 101	Gifts from the Star	Taiwan Creative Industries Christmas Show
2013	Institute of Contemporary Arts Singapore	Illuminations	Taiwanese Media Art
2013	Taiwan Culture and Creative Platform Foundation	Vibrant Vision	Reportedly the first international curator
2012	Museum of Contemporary Art Taipei	Wonderland: New Contemporary Art from Australia	
2011	Ars Electronica, Linz	FutureLab 2	Founder, Australian Art Residency
2010	Taipei World Trade Centre, Taipei	Encoded	First Australian Media Art Exhibition
2009	Aros Kunstmuseum, Aarhus	Enter Action	Novamedia: Mari Velonaki
2009	Embassy of Australia, Washington DC	Impact by Degrees	Key public diplomacy event prior to UN Climate Change Summit COP15
2008	Alexandra Institute, Denmark	Impact: Living in the Age of Climate Change	
2008	Ars Electronica Centre, Linz	FutureLab 1	Founder, Australian Art Residency
2007	Ars Electronica, Linz	Second Life: Havidol	Novamedia: Justine Cooper
2007	Biennale of Electronica Art Perth	Stillness	
2007	Australia Council for the Arts	Strange Attractors	Novamedia: showcase
2006	Zendai Museum of Modern Art, Shanghai	Strange Attractors: charm between Art and Science	
2006	Wood Street Galleries, Pittsburgh	Can we fall in love with a machine?	Novamedia: Mari Velonaki
2005	World Art Museum, Beijing	The Millennium Dialogue	
2005	Australian Centre for the Moving Image, Melbourne	Granular Synthesis: Modell 5	Australian Premiere
2005	The Art Gallery of South Australia, Adelaide	Reactivate!	
2005	State Library of Victoria, Melbourne	Through the looking glass: Visualising Science	National Science Week
2004	Ars Electronica, Linz	Unnatural Selection	First Australian Media Art Exhibition
2004	Australian Centre for the Moving Image, Melbourne	GameTime	First International Game Culture Conference
2004	State Library of Victoria, Melbourne	Reactivate!	
2004	Melbourne Art Fair, Melbourne	Novamedia	First Media Art Exhibition
2003	Barbican Centre, London	oZone	Australian Festival
2003	Centre Pompidou, Paris	oZone	First Australian Media Art Exhibition
2003	RMITUniversity, Melbourne	MelbourneDAC	First Digital Arts & Culture Conference; Novamedia: producer
2003	State Library of Victoria, Melbourne	+playengines+	
2002	Tasmanian Museum and Art Gallery, Hobart	Wild	First International Media Art Exhibition
2000	Next Wave : Wide Awake	HomoGenesis	Advertising intervention
1999	Village Road Show Cinemas, Hobart	HomoGenesis	Advertising intervention
1999	City of Hobart Festival	Deluge	Advertising intervention
1998	Plimsoll Gallery	Excursive sight	Curator: Raymond Arnold

== International curator-in-residence ==
Date	Residence	Country	Award
2016	Home Hotel [Da.An]	Taiwan	Home Hotel
2011	Museum of Contemporary Art Taipei	Taiwan	Asialink
2008	Alexandra Institute	Denmark	Danish Arts Council
2008	UNESCO Suomenlinna Residence	Finland	Foreign Ministry of Finland
2007	Ars Electronica	Austria	Australia Council for the Arts
