= Canadolite =

Canadian oil tanker

The Canadian oil tanker Canadolite was an 11,309 GRT vessel. She was built in 1926 and launched later that year. She was owned by the Imperial Oil company and was built in Germany.

On March 25, 1941, she was captured by the German auxiliary cruiser Kormoran. Her crew was saved and sent to a German internment camp. She was subsequently turned into the German tanker Sudetenland. She survived until 1944 when RAF aircraft sank her in Brest.
