= Australia–Romania relations =

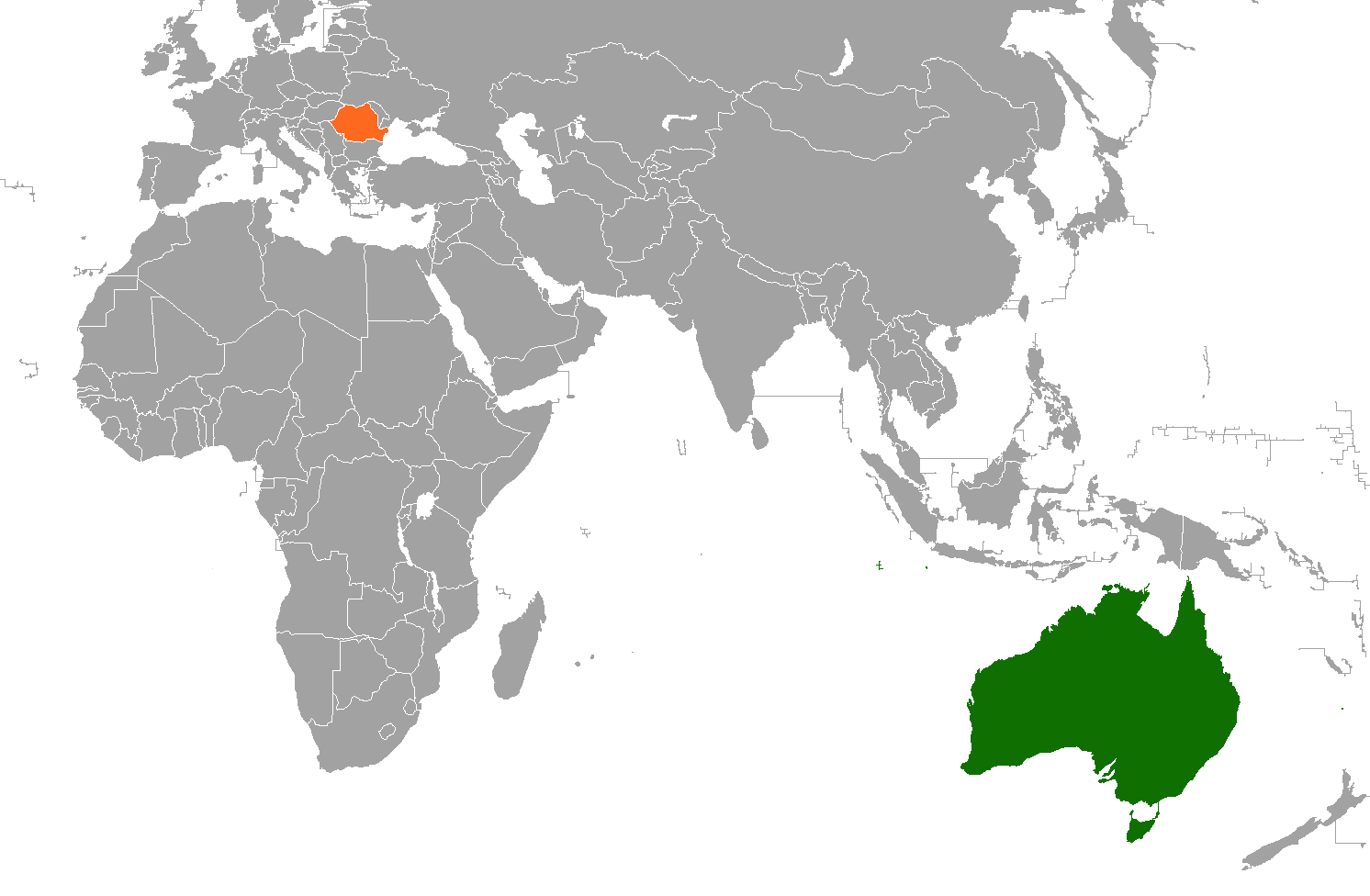

- Australia: Romania

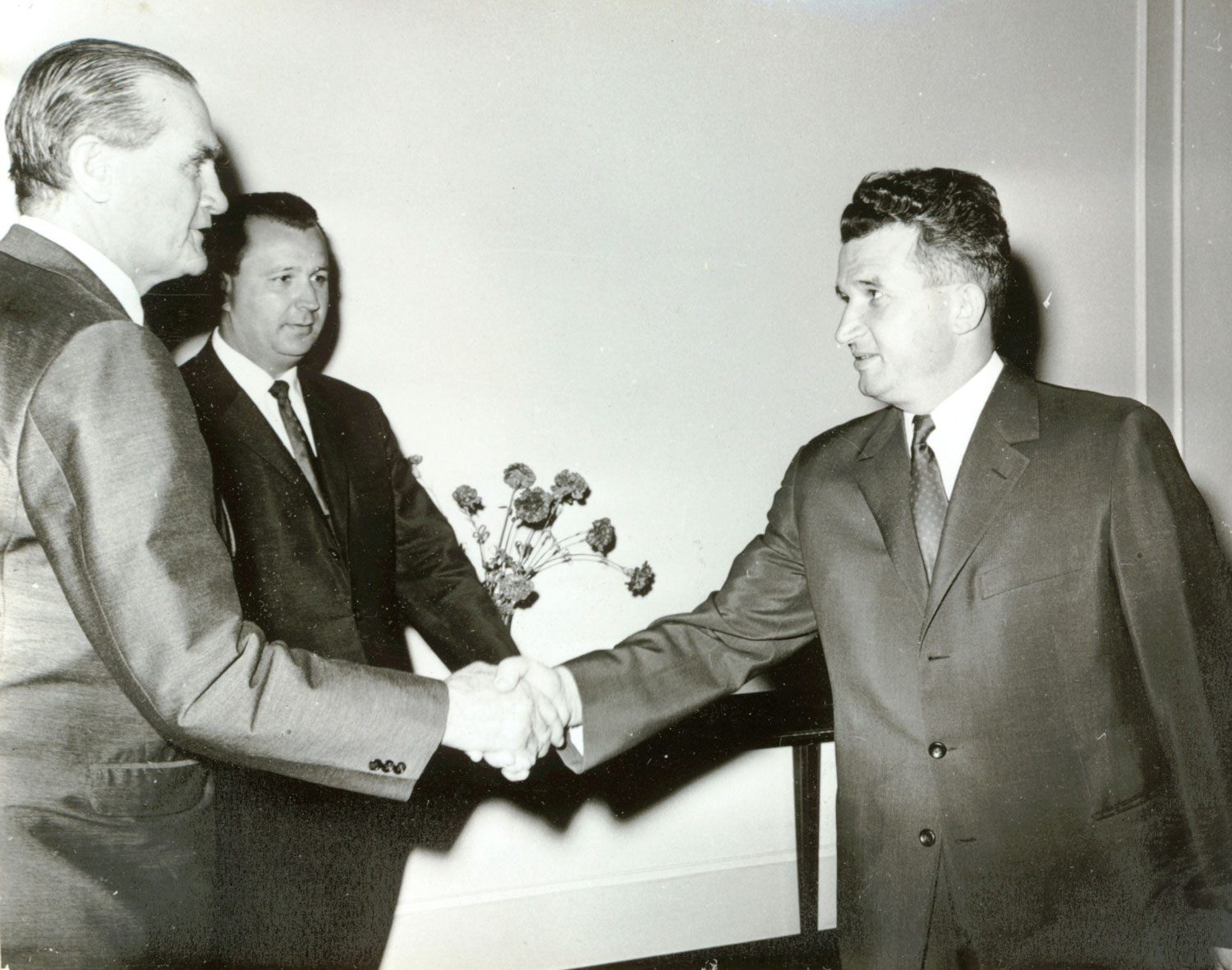
Australian deputy prime minister John McEwen (left) shaking hands with Romanian head of state Nicolae Ceaușescu in 1967

Australia–Romania relations refer to bilateral relations between Australia and Romania. Australia is represented through its embassy in Athens, Greece, and a consulate in Bucharest, while Romania has an embassy in Canberra and a consulate in Melbourne and Sydney. The countries officially established their diplomatic relations on 18 March 1968.

Trade between Australia and Romania accelerated in the 1960s. In 1967, Australian deputy prime minister John McEwen visited Romania and signed a trade pact with Romanian foreign minister Gheorghe Cioară. Romanian deputy prime minister Gogu Rădulescu made a reciprocal visit to Australia in 1969.

On 23 June 2016, the Minister of Foreign Affairs of Romania Lazăr Comănescu met with John Griffin, ambassador of Australia to Romania, at the embassy in Athens. Comănescu expressed interest in deepening diplomatic relations with Australia and increasing commercial and economic activities between the two countries. He also acknowledged the commitment and cooperation of Australia towards NATO regarding Afghanistan (both countries have deployed troops in the area). Griffin affirmed the interest of the Australian authorities for the same.

On 8 October 2018, Teodor Meleșcanu, Romanian Minister of Foreign Affairs, met with the Australian Senator Ian Macdonald. Meleșcanu acknowledged the improvement of the diplomatic relations between the two countries, which multiplied their contacts several times in recent years. He also noted the 50th anniversary of diplomatic relations and the possibilities for further improving relations between both. To celebrate it, an exhibition was organized celebrating the contribution of the Romanian explorers Emil Racoviță and Teodor Negoiță in Antarctica.

== Resident diplomatic missions ==
- Australia is accredited to Romania from its embassy in Athens, Greece.
- Romania has an embassy in Canberra and consulates-general in Melbourne and Sydney.

== See also ==
- Foreign relations of Australia
- Foreign relations of Romania
- Australia-EU relations
- Romanian Australians
