= Aneliya =

Aneliya or Anelia (Bulgarian: Анелия) is a feminine given name. Notable people with the name include:

- Aneliya Georgieva Atanasova, Bulgarian singer
- Anelia Karova
- Aneliya Klisarova
- Aneliya Kukunova
- Aneliya Kumanova, Bulgarian shot putter and hammer thrower
- Anelia Nuneva
- Anelia Pavlova
- Anelia Ralenkova
