= Australia–Germany bilateral treaties =

The following is a list of international bilateral treaties between Australia and Germany

- Early treaties were extended to Australia by the British Empire, however they are still generally in force.
- European Union treaties, extended to Germany are not included below.

1872	Extradition	Treaty between the United Kingdom of Great Britain and Ireland and Germany for the Mutual Surrender of Fugitive Criminals (London, 14 May 1872)
1874	Trade	Declaration between the Government of the United Kingdom of Great Britain and Ireland and the Government of Germany relative to Joint Stock Companies (London, 27 March 1874)
1879	Other	Agreement between the Government of the United Kingdom of Great Britain and Ireland and the Government of Germany for the Mutual Relief of Distressed Seamen (London, 27 May 1879)
1879	Extradition	Agreement between the Government of the United Kingdom of Great Britain and Ireland and the Government of Germany relative to Merchant Seamen Deserters (London, 5 November 1879)
1886	Trade	Declaration between the Government of the United Kingdom of Great Britain and Ireland and the Government of Germany relating to Reciprocal Freedom of Trade and Commerce in the British and German Possessions and Protectorates in the Western Pacific (Berlin, 10 April 1886)
1904	Arbitration	Agreement between the United Kingdom of Great Britain and Ireland and Germany providing for the Settlement by Arbitration of Certain Classes of Questions which may arise between the Two Governments
1909	Arbitration	Exchange of Notes between the United Kingdom of Great Britain and Ireland and Germany extending for a Further Period of One Year the Agreement providing for the Settlement by Arbitration of Certain Classes of Questions
1910	Arbitration	Exchange of Notes between the United Kingdom of Great Britain and Ireland and Germany extending for a Further Period of Four Years the Agreement providing for the Settlement by Arbitration of Certain Classes of Questions which may arise between the Two Governments
1911	Extradition	Treaty between the United Kingdom of Great Britain and Ireland and Germany respecting Extradition between British and German Protectorates
1912	Extradition	Treaty between the United Kingdom of Great Britain and Ireland and Germany extending to certain British Protectorates the Treaty for the Mutual Surrender of Fugitive Criminals of 14 May 1872
1913	Civil law	Declaration between the Government of the United Kingdom of Great Britain and Ireland and the Government of Germany additional to the Agreement relative to Joint Stock Companies of 27 March 1874 (Berlin, 25 March 1913)
1926	Money orders	Convention for the Exchange of Money Orders between the Postal Administrations of Australia and Germany
1930	Extradition	Exchange of Notes constituting an Agreement between the Government of the United Kingdom of Great Britain and Northern Ireland [and on behalf of the Governments of Australia, New Zealand and South Africa] and the Government of Germany extending to certain Mandated Territories the Treaty for the Mutual Surrender of Fugitive Criminals of 14 May 1872
1930	War/Peace	Agreement between the Government of Australia and the Government of the German Reich regarding the Release of Property, Rights and Interests of German Nationals, and Exchange of Notes
1932	Postal	Agreement for an Exchange of Postal Parcels between the Commonwealth of Australia and Germany
1933	Civil law	Convention between the United Kingdom and Germany regarding Legal Proceedings in Civil and Commercial Matters
1935	War/Peace	Exchange of Notes constituting an Agreement between the Government of the United Kingdom of Great Britain and Northern Ireland and the Government of the German Reich regarding the Limitation of Naval Armaments
1952	Visas	Agreement between the Government of the Commonwealth of Australia and the Government of the Federal Republic of Germany for Assisted Migration
1953	Visas	Exchange of Notes constituting an Agreement between the Government of Australia and the Government of the Federal Republic of Germany regarding Visas and Visa Fees
1958	War/Peace	Exchanges of Notes constituting an Agreement between the Government of Australia and the Government of the Netherlands concerning the Settlement of Intercustodial Conflicts relating to German Enemy Assets
1959	Trade	Agreement between the Commonwealth of Australia and the Federal Republic of Germany relating to Air Transport, and Exchanges of Notes
1959	Visas	Agreement between the Government of the Commonwealth of Australia and the Government of the Federal Republic of Germany for Assisted Migration
1959	Trade	Trade Agreement between the Government of the Commonwealth of Australia and the Government of the Federal Republic of Germany, and Two Exchanges of Notes
1961	Trade	[First] Protocol to the Trade Agreement between the Government of the Commonwealth of Australia and the Government of the Federal Republic of Germany of 14 October 1959
1963	Postal	Agreement between the Commonwealth of Australia and the Federal Republic of Germany concerning the Exchange of Postal Parcels
1965	Visas	Agreement between the Government of the Commonwealth of Australia and the Government of the Federal Republic of Germany on Assisted Migration
1965	Money orders	Agreement between the Government of the Commonwealth of Australia and the Government of the Federal Republic of Germany regarding the Exchange of Money Orders
1966	War/Peace	Treaty between the Commonwealth of Australia and the Federal Republic of Germany regarding the Division between Australia and Germany of Compensation Paid by the Government of the State of Israel for German Secular Property in Israel [Templar Agreement], and Three Exchanges of Notes
1974	Trade	Trade Agreement between the Government of Australia and the Government of the German Democratic Republic, and Agreed Minute
1974	Trade	Exchange of Notes constituting an Agreement between the Government of Australia and the Government of the Federal Republic of Germany amending the Agreement relating to Air Transport of 22 May 1957
1975	Science	Exchange of Notes constituting an Agreement between the Government of Australia and the Government of the Federal Republic of Germany concerning the Launching of a Skylark Vehicle and Payload at Woomera for Scientific Purposes
1975	Taxation	Agreement between the Commonwealth of Australia and the Federal Republic of Germany for the Avoidance of Double Taxation and the Prevention of Fiscal Evasion with Respect to Taxes on Income and Capital and to certain other Taxes, and Protocol
1976	Science	Agreement between the Government of Australia and the Government of the Federal Republic of Germany on Scientific and Technological Cooperation
1977	Trade	Protocol to the Trade Agreement between the Government of Australia and the Government of the German Democratic Republic of 28 February 1974
1979	Science	Exchange of Notes constituting an Agreement between the Government of Australia and the Government of the Federal Republic of Germany concerning the Launching of Two Scientific Payloads from Woomera for Scientific Purposes
1979	Defence	Exchange of Notes constituting an Agreement between the Government of Australia and the Government of the Federal Republic of Germany for the Reciprocal Safeguarding of Classified Material
1981	Environment	Agreement between the Government of Australia and the Government of Japan for the Protection of Migratory Birds in Danger of Extinction and their Environment
1987	Science	Exchange of Notes constituting an Agreement between the Government of Australia and the Government of the Federal Republic of Germany on the Launching of Sounding Rockets
1990	Extradition	Treaty between Australia and the Federal Republic of Germany concerning Extradition
1995	Science	Agreement between the Government of Australia and the Government of the Federal Republic of Germany concerning the Landing and Recovery of a Space Capsule in Australia (EXPRESS Agreement), and Exchange of Notes
1996	Trade	Exchanges of Notes constituting an Agreement between the Government of Australia and the Government of the Federal Republic of Germany to further amend the Route Schedule to the Agreement relating to Air Transport, and Exchange of Notes, of 22 May 1957
2000	Other	Agreement between the Government of Australia and the Government of the Federal Republic of Germany on Cultural Cooperation (Dresden, 7 November 1997)
2001	Trade	Films Co-production Agreement Between the Government of Australia and the Government of the Federal Republic of Germany (Canberra, 17 January 2001)
2003	Social security	Agreement on Social Security Between Australia and the Federal Republic of Germany (Canberra, 13 December 2000)
2008	Social security	Agreement Between Australia and the Federal Republic of Germany on Social Security to Govern Persons Temporarily Employed in the Territory of the Other State ("Supplementary Agreement") (Berlin, 9 February 2007)
2016	Other	Amendment to the Convention on the Physical Protection of Nuclear Material (Vienna, 8 July 2005)
2016	Taxation	Agreement between Australia and the Federal Republic of Germany for the Elimination of Double Taxation with respect to Taxes on Income and on Capital and the Prevention of Fiscal Evasion and Avoidance (Berlin, 12 November 2015) -
