= Anela Choy =

American biological oceanographer

- Born: Hawaii
- Awards: L'Oréal-UNESCO For Women in Science Awards
- Scientific career
- Institutions: Scripps Institution of Oceanography; University of Hawaiʻi at Mānoa; Monterey Bay Aquarium Research Institute

Anela Choy is an American biological oceanographer, who is assistant professor at Scripps Institution of Oceanography, University of California, San Diego. She is most noted for her discovery that the stomachs of deep sea fish (living at an average depth of 300 m; 1,000 ft; 170 fathoms) contain bottle caps, trash bags, and microplastics. She also led a team that designed a remote-operated device that was released in Monterey Bay to track pollution of microplastics. A native Hawaiian, she is a member of the Society for Advancement of Chicanos/Hispanics and Native Americans in Science (SACNAS) and vocal advocate for women in science.

== Awards and recognition ==
In 2018 she won the L’Oréal-UNESCO for Women in Science Award for her work, which focuses on how human activity, such as fishing and plastic pollution, shapes deep ocean food webs.

In 2021, Choy was awarded a Sloan Fellowship as an early career researcher.
