= German auxiliary cruiser Kormoran =

Kriegsmarine merchant raider of World War II

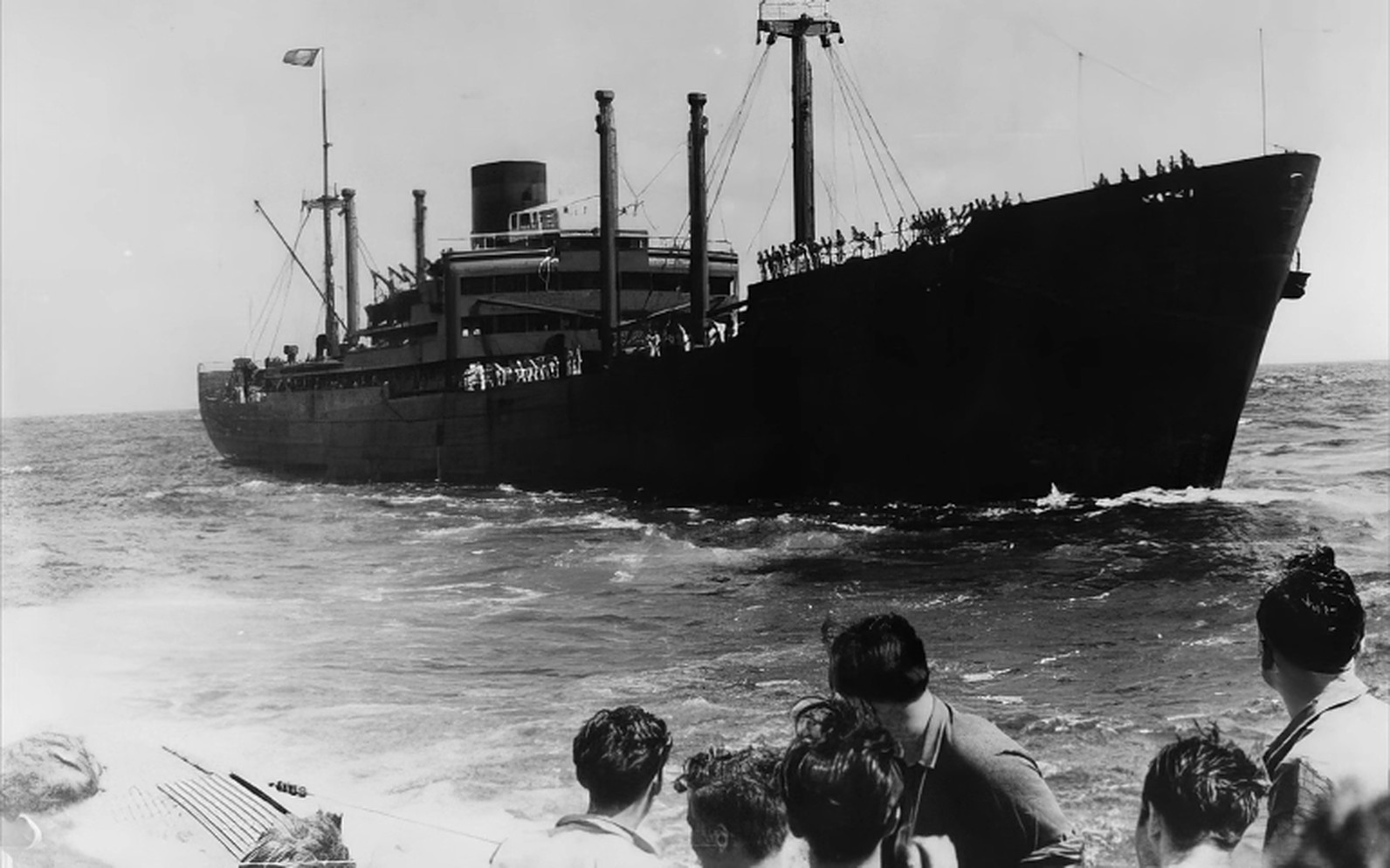
- Auxiliary cruiser Kormoran meets a German U-boat at sea

History

Germany
- Name: Steiermark
- Namesake: Styria
- Operator: Hamburg America Line
- Route: East Asia (intended)
- Builder: Friedrich Krupp Germaniawerft, Kiel, Germany
- Launched: 15 September 1938
- Fate: Requisitioned by Kriegsmarine

History

Germany
- Name: Kormoran
- Namesake: SMS Cormoran and the Cormorant
- Commissioned: 9 October 1940
- Reclassified: Merchant raider (1940-41)
- Identification: HSK-8 (Note: HSK is short for Handelsstörkreuzer, 'trade disruption cruiser'.); Schiff 41 (German administrative designation); Raider G (British designation for tracking)
- Fate: Scuttled following battle on 19 November 1941

General characteristics as Kormoran
- Type: Handelsstörkreuzer (lit. 'trade disruption cruiser', meaning commerce raider)
- Tonnage: 8,736 GRT
- Displacement: 19,900 t (19,600 long tons)
- Length: 164 m (538 ft 1 in)
- Beam: 20.20 m (66 ft 3 in)
- Draught: 8.50 m (27 ft 11 in)
- Propulsion: 4 × 9-cylinder diesel motors
- Speed: 18 kn (33 km/h; 21 mph)
- Boats & landing craft carried: 1 × LS-3 minelaying boat
- Complement: 25 officers, 375 enlisted
- Armament: 6 × 15 cm (5.9 in) SK L/45 C guns; 2 × 3.7 cm (1.46 in) PaK 36 anti-tank guns; 5 × 2 cm (0.79 in) FlaK 30 anti-aircraft guns; 6 × torpedo tubes (2 twin deck mounts; 2 single, aft-angled submerged tubes); 24 × 53.3 cm (21.0 in) torpedoes; 360 EMC + 30 TMB naval mines
- Aircraft carried: 2 × Arado 196 seaplanes

The German auxiliary cruiser Kormoran (HSK-8) was a Kriegsmarine (German navy) merchant raider of World War II. Originally the merchant vessel Steiermark (lit. 'Styria'), the ship was acquired by the navy following the outbreak of war for conversion into a raider. Administered under the designation Schiff 41 (lit. 'Ship 41'), to the Allied navies she was known as Raider G. The largest merchant raider operated by Germany during World War II, Kormoran (lit. 'cormorant') was responsible for the destruction of 10 merchant vessels and the capture of an 11th during her year-long career in the Atlantic and Indian oceans.

She is also known for sinking the Australian light cruiser HMAS Sydney during a mutually destructive battle off Western Australia on 19 November 1941. Damage sustained during the battle prompted the scuttling of Kormoran. While 318 of the 399 aboard the German ship were rescued (Note: Two lifeboats carrying 103 persons had reached the Australian mainland when they were found.) and placed in prisoner of war camps for the remainder of World War II, and then for almost two further years after the war with Germany had ended, there were no survivors from the 645 aboard the Australian cruiser. The wreck of Kormoran was rediscovered on 12 March 2008, four days before that of her adversary.

Kormoran's success against HMAS Sydney is commonly attributed to the proximity of the two ships during the engagement, and the raider's advantages of surprise and rapid, accurate fire. Prior to the discovery of the wrecks in 2008, the cruiser's loss with all hands compared to the survival of most of the German crew created controversy and spawned numerous conspiracy theories; some alleged that the German commander, Theodor Detmers, used illegal ruses to lure Sydney into range, others that a Japanese submarine was involved, or that details of the battle were concealed through a wide-ranging coverup. None of these claims have ever been substantiated by any evidence.

== Construction and conversion ==
The merchant vessel Steiermark was constructed by Friedrich Krupp Germaniawerft in Kiel for the Hamburg-Amerika Line. Launched in 1938, the ship was to operate on the East Asia run, but had completed only sea trials when war was declared.

Following World War I, German naval power had limits placed upon it by the Treaty of Versailles, which were later eased by the 1935 Anglo-German Naval Agreement. By the 1930s, the discrepancy between the conventional warship strength of Germany and that of other nations led the German military to recognize that auxiliary cruisers engaged in commerce raiding could play a significant role in future wars, as they had during World War I. Merchant ships that could be converted into raiders were identified, and were to be taken up by the Kriegsmarine for conversion following a declaration of war.

Steiermark was one of these ships. Receiving the designation Schiff 41 (lit. 'Ship 41') for administrative purposes, she was taken into dockyard hands following the outbreak of World War II. Conversion of the merchant ship commenced in early 1940, and was prioritized as second only to work on the U-boat fleet. The conversion work included installation of camouflaged weapons, fitting of bunks for the sailors, creation of internal passageways leading to their stations. Prisoner accommodation, consisting of an open area for hammocks and facilities to keep ship's masters and women separate from the general population, were constructed. The raider was also provided with equipment with which to modify her appearance and allow her to masquerade as other merchant vessels. While the ship was being refitted, her future crew underwent training aboard the blockade runner Monte Pascoal.

Korvettenkapitän (Lieutenant Commander) Theodor Detmers was selected to command Schiff 41 in July 1940; the 37-year-old was the youngest man to command a German merchant raider. Detmers named the ship Kormoran, inspired by SMS Cormoran (a Russian merchant ship captured by the Germans during World War I and operated as a raider) and the cormorant (with Detmers comparing the seabird's use in fishing to his ship's attempts in catching Allied vessels). After a successful trials cruise in September 1940, Kormoran was commissioned on 9 October.

== Design ==
Kormoran was one of nine (Note: Other sources state that eleven auxiliary cruisers were operated by the Kriegsmarine during World War II: two were reclassified for other uses before leaving German waters.) civilian ships taken up by the German Navy for conversion into merchant raiders; they were referred to alternately as Hilfskreuzer (auxiliary cruisers) and Handelsstörkreuzer (lit. 'trade disruption cruisers'). She was the largest of the raiders, and the most recently constructed when she was taken up for modification. After modification, Kormoran was 164 metres (538 ft 1 in) long and 20.20 metres (66 ft 3 in) wide, with a gross register tonnage of 8,736. She was propelled by four 9-cylinder diesel engines driving electric motors, which could propel the ship at 18 knots (33 km/h; 21 mph).

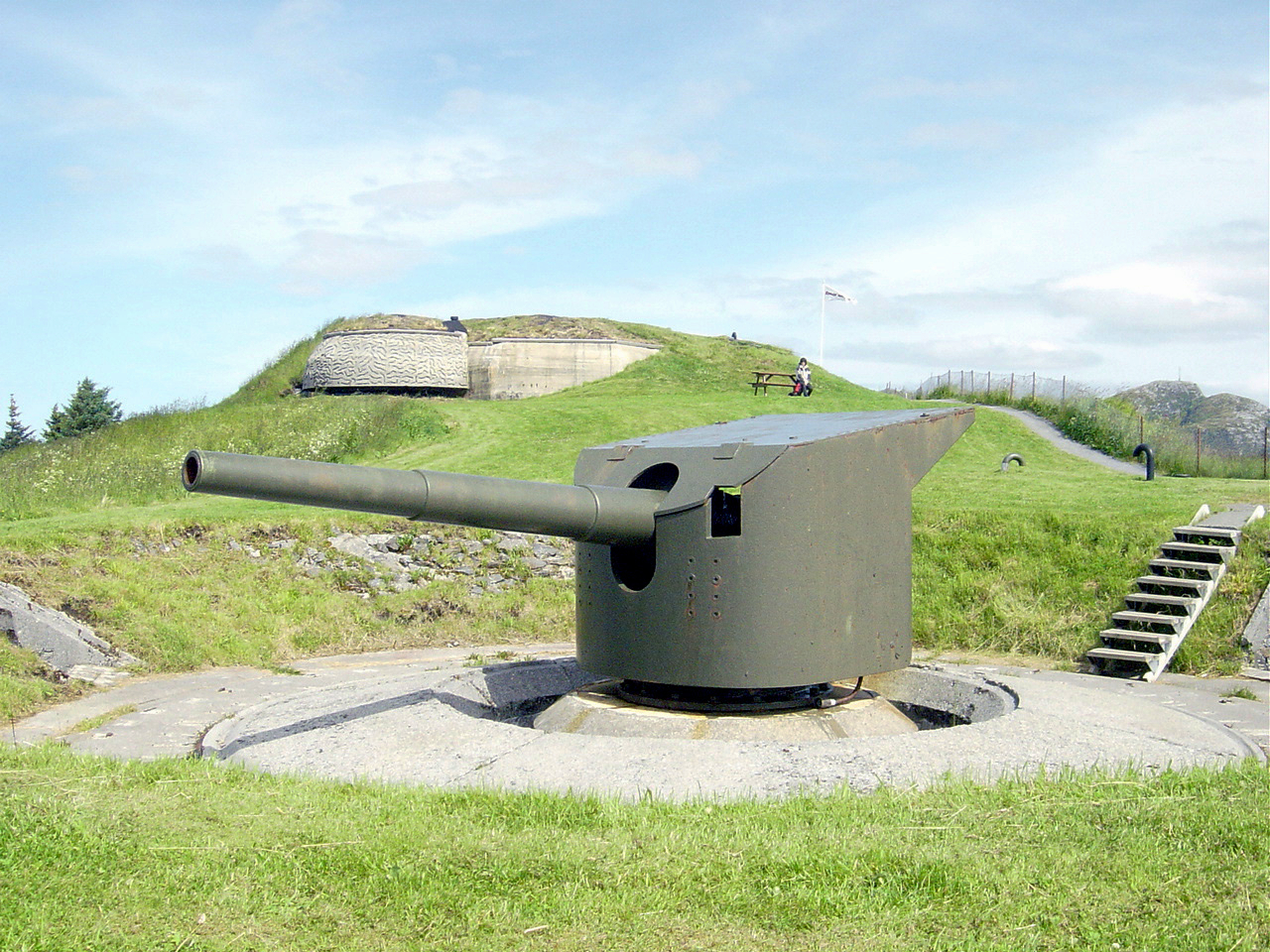
A 15-centimetre (5.9 in) SK L/45 gun at Bud, Norway

The raider was fitted with six 15-centimetre (5.9 in) SK L/45 guns as primary armament: two each within the forecastle ("1" and "2") and quarterdeck ("5" and "6"), and one each fore and aft ("3" and "4" respectively) on the centreline. These guns were World War I-vintage; gun "3" had been removed from the battlecruiser SMS Seydlitz in 1916. The forecastle and quarterdeck guns were hidden behind counter-weighted false hull plates, while each centreline gun was concealed by fake cargo hatch walls.

The secondary armament consisted of five 2-centimetre (0.79 in) anti-aircraft guns: two on the forecastle, two on the after funnel deck, and the fifth in the quarterdeck. All five were hidden by the structure of the ship until they were raised clear on hydraulic platforms. There were plans to fit four 3.7-centimetre (1.5 in) anti-aircraft guns, but only two ex-army anti-tank guns could be scrounged; these were installed on Kormoran's superstructure, hidden by sheet metal panels. Kormoran was also equipped with six torpedo tubes: two dual launchers on the upper deck, and a single underwater tube on each side. The underwater tubes were amidships, angled at 135° from the bow, and could only be fired if the raider was travelling at less than 3 knots (5.6 km/h; 3.5 mph). Kormoran carried a payload of mines, with an LS-3 fast boat carried inside No. 6 cargo hatch for minelaying. The raider carried two Arado Ar 196 floatplanes for reconnaissance. Although Detmers wanted a catapult, such equipment would have spoiled any merchant ship disguise used by Kormoran; instead, the planes were stored inside No. 5 cargo hatch, and were launched and recovered from the water with hoists. Mechanical problems, difficulties in moving the aircraft between the hatch and the water, plus a lack of opportunities meant that only seven flights were made during the ship's operational deployment.

== Operational history ==
=== Running the blockade ===
The day after commissioning, Kormoran sailed to Kiel, where she was provisioned for a 12-month voyage. The raider then travelled to Gotenhafen and underwent further trials of the ship's weapons, aircraft, and minelaying boat. Despite a range of problems and defects, Detmers elected to repair problems at sea instead of taking the ship into dock and delaying their mission.

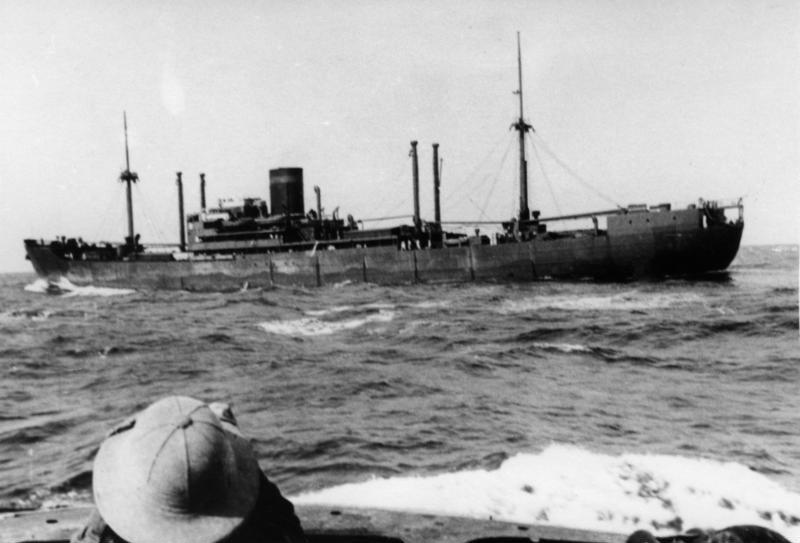
Kormoran in 1940

The raider departed on 3 December, and once she cleared German waters on 10 December, her disguise was changed from a minesweeper to the Soviet freighter Vyacheslav Molotov. The Royal Navy had blockaded German waters at the start of the war, and Kormoran had to break through to reach her first patrol area. It was suggested that the raider either sail through the English Channel with support from captured French coastal batteries and the Luftwaffe, or around the Faroe Islands. Detmers chose to travel north of Iceland and through the Denmark Strait before heading south. The longer route was justified by its greater distance from British naval and aviation bases, and was thus less likely to be patrolled. The raider reached the strait late in the evening of 12 December, passed through it under the cover of a heavy storm, and entered the Atlantic by the following midday without encountering any Allied ships.

=== Atlantic Ocean ===
Having cleared the British blockade, Kormoran's instructions were to search the Atlantic Ocean for targets of opportunity, then move to the Indian Ocean and seek out Allied merchant shipping, with additional orders to lay mines around one or more Allied ports in India or Australia. Kormoran was also expected to replenish U-boats when ordered to do so, and carried extra torpedoes and spare parts. The raider's first operational area was in the Atlantic, below latitude 40° north, which she crossed during the night of 19–20 December. The German ship initially patrolled the western mid-Atlantic, outside the Pan-American Security Zone. During the first two weeks, the only ships spotted were merchant vessels flying the United States flag, which merchant raiders were forbidden to attack as they were still neutral.

By 6 January 1941, Detmers was ready to relocate to a point west of the Mediterranean because of a lack of targets, but that afternoon, Kormoran encountered the 3,729-ton Greek freighter Antonis. The raider ordered the freighter to heave to and not send any wireless transmissions, and sent a boarding party over. Antonis was armed with three British machine guns and loaded with 4,800 tons of Welsh coal. Though Germany was not at war with Greece, the presence of Allied weapons and cargo allowed Detmers to sink her or take her as a prize. As coal was of little use to the Kriegsmarine, the weapons, ammunition, and 29 crew were transferred to Kormoran, and the boarding party scuttled her at 18°17′N 28°32′W. Admiralty notifications for raider activity gave an incorrect date and location for the attack, and initially attributed it to the raider Thor. Kormoran then headed southeast, avoiding the convoy routes from the Mediterranean to America and down the African coast, to seek vessels sailing alone and without warship escort.

Before sunset on 18 January, smoke was spotted on the horizon, so Kormoran accelerated and altered course to pursue. The source of the smoke was a tanker flying no flags, showing no lights, and zigzagging to thwart submarine attack, leading Detmers to conclude she was an Allied vessel. With little time before the sun set and the likelihood the tanker would resist capture, Kormoran commenced fire at 6,400 metres (7,000 yd) in an attempt to disable the ship. When the third salvo hit, the merchantman broadcast a distress call, identifying herself as British Union and saying she was under attack by an unknown vessel at 26°24′N 30°58′W. Firing continued until British Union directed a light towards Kormoran, which the Germans assumed was a surrender signal, but as the raider closed to 3,700 metres (4,000 yd), four shots were fired by the tanker. All four missed, and heavy retaliatory fire from the raider set the merchant ship alight and forced the crew to abandon ship. The decision was made to destroy the 6,987-ton tanker with a torpedo, although two torpedoes and shells from the raider's main guns were required to sink her, while a third torpedo exploded as soon as it cleared its safety distance and armed; Detmers later stated the quantity of ammunition used during the attempted capture was excessive for the result obtained. The tanker's master, 27 sailors, and a pet monkey were recovered from two lifeboats as the tanker sank at 26°29′N 31°07′W, and the raider fled the area. The distress call and glow from the fires attracted the attention of the armed merchant cruiser HMS Arawa, which passed through the engagement site around midnight in pursuit, but failed to locate Kormoran, and returned that morning to collect a third lifeboat carrying seven survivors. These sailors stated their attacker had fired on the other two lifeboats, a claim not made by those rescued by the Germans. The Allies initially assumed that German cruiser Admiral Scheer was responsible, but after this was disproven, the Admiralty was unable to determine the identity of the attacker.

Just after 1 pm on 29 January, Kormoran encountered a large merchantman which altered course on sighting the raider, but returned to her original heading after Kormoran made no aggressive moves. Detmers instead waited until the distance between the ships had decreased before the raider altered course to intercept, dropped her camouflage, and ordered the merchantman to stop. The ship did not comply, and after a warning shot elicited no response, Kormoran fired for effect. A distress signal was transmitted but jammed by the raider, and after unsuccessfully trying to break away from the faster German ship, the merchant vessel came to a stop and ceased attempts to transmit. The crew was ordered by signals from Kormoran to abandon ship, but the merchant sailors did not comply until after the raider resumed fire, having observed an attempt to man the ship's stern gun. A boarding party identified the victim as the 11,900-ton refrigerator ship Afric Star, carrying meat and butter to England. The complicated configuration and damaged condition of Afric Star ruled against her capture as a prize ship; after confiscating code books and other vital documents, and recovering 76 people, including two women, attempts were made to scuttle her. The merchantman refused to sink, and Kormoran had to use shells and torpedoes to send her to the bottom at 8°44′N 24°38′W.

Later that day, lookouts aboard the raider spotted a merchant ship sailing without lights. Sneaking up on the vessel, Kormoran opened fire; her first salvo missed, but within minutes, the target was heavily damaged and aflame. The ship transmitted a distress signal, which Kormoran was unable to jam completely, but this ceased as crew members started to abandon ship. The raider stopped firing, but resumed when the merchantman attempted another transmission, and shore stations responded. Communications intercepts and the code books taken from Afric Star earlier that day revealed the target's identity: the 5,273-ton British freighter Eurylochus, with a cargo of bombers for the Gold Coast. These intercepts also indicated that several parties, including the Air Ministry, were aware of the attack, prompting Detmers to order the torpedoing of Eurylochus. This was accomplished with a single torpedo, sinking the British ship and her cargo at 8°15′N 24°04′W, three and a half hours after Afric Star. 39 Chinese and four British crew were recovered by the German raider before she fled the area with British warships Norfolk and Devonshire in pursuit. Another 28 survivors were found by the Spanish merchant ship Monte Tiede later that night, with 10 men killed during the attack or lost at sea. Eurylochus' master was among those rescued by the Allies, and recounted that two ships had attacked, one of them armed with 280-millimetre (11 in) guns, which led British Naval Intelligence to conclude that the responsible ships were Thor and Admiral Scheer, or an unknown raider operating in concert with one of these. Among the rescued was ship's gunner Frank Laskier who, on returning to England, was interviewed by BBC radio and proved so popular he became a figurehead for Merchant Navy enlistment propaganda for the rest of the war.

After evading pursuit, Kormoran made for a point off the Cape Verde Islands, where she rendezvoused with the supply ship Nordmark on 7 February. During a three-day replenishment operation, Kormoran topped up Nordmark's supply of spare U-boat parts with components brought from Germany, and transferred 170 of the 174 prisoners acquired so far. The four Chinese sailors from Eurylochus were hired to stay aboard the raider as laundrymen, and the British Union crew left their pet monkey aboard as thanks for their treatment while in captivity. A piano was taken from Nordmark's companion Duquesa, a captured coal-burning ship that was to be scuttled when her fuel ran out, but Detmers warned that if the piano caused any problems among the crew, it would be pushed overboard.

Kormoran left the rendezvous on 10 February and headed south. During the transit, Detmers received a signal from Germany indicating that his ship had been awarded two First Class Iron Crosses, and 50 Second Class Iron Crosses, to be distributed as he saw fit. Detmers transmitted a request on 18 February for WM-80 white metal (Babbitt (metal)), as the softer WM-10 used in bearings for two of the four diesel engines were wearing out too quickly. Some metal was acquired from the raider Pinguin on 25 February, but this was not enough to replace all the bearings. On 15 March, Kormoran met German submarine U-124 to transfer torpedoes, provisions, and spare parts, but rough seas forced the two vessels to head south, where they met Admiral Scheer a day later. The raider's broken radar and a sailor with an eye injury were transferred to Admiral Scheer, but attempts to replenish the U-boat were again interrupted by bad weather, forcing the two vessels to relocate again. The equipment transfer and refueling took another three days, during which crewmen from U-124 enjoyed the relatively luxurious facilities aboard Kormoran, and a sick sailor from the submarine was traded for a healthy man from the raider.

Kormoran sailed north to the Freetown-South America shipping route, and began to patrol near where it intersected the border of the Pan-American Security Zone. On the morning of 22 March, the raider encountered a tanker, which identified herself as the British vessel Agnita. Kormoran instructed her to stop and maintain wireless silence or be fired upon. The tanker instead broke away and began to transmit a distress signal, which was jammed as Kormoran opened fire. Agnita signaled surrender after two salvoes; 12 British and 25 Chinese sailors were captured, along with maps of the minefields surrounding Freetown Harbour. Efforts to scuttle the tanker failed, and Kormoran had to waste another torpedo to sink the ship at 3°20′S 23°40′W.

Against usual practice, Detmers decided to return to the site of the action three days later, where another tanker was spotted. Kormoran revealed her weapons and fired a warning shot at the tanker, which initially attempted to flee but then chose to surrender when the morning mist lifted and revealed the nature of her attacker. The 11,309-ton (German-built) Canadian tanker Canadolite was taken as a prize ship, with a German crew taking the ship and her 44 sailors to Bordeaux, France, while the four officers were imprisoned aboard Kormoran. After the captured tanker left, it was realised recognition signals to avoid Luftwaffe attack had not been supplied, and Kormoran raced to meet the tanker when she rendezvoused with the supply ship Nordmark. The raider met the supply ship on 27 March, but it appeared Canadolite had enough fuel to reach France and had chosen to sail straight there. Two U-boats were scheduled to reach the rendezvous point for resupply; Detmers suggested he meet U-105, which was carrying more white metal for Kormoran's engines, while Nordmark focused on U-106. The commanding officer of U-105 agreed to transmit a warning to Germany regarding Canadolite once the U-boat had left the rendezvous point, which did not occur until six days later because of equipment problems delaying the replenishment. The tanker arrived safely on 13 April, was renamed Sudetenland, and remained operational until her sinking by the Royal Air Force in 1944.

Kormoran was due to rendezvous with the tanker Rudolf Albrecht on 4 April, and had no opportunity to search for new targets. The 42 prisoners from Kormoran were transferred to the Rudolf Albrecht, but as she was a civilian vessel, her master was sworn in by Detmers as a naval officer, and an armed guard had to be supplied. Detmers ordered the transfer of four men from Nordmark to Rudolf Albrecht as guards, along with a fifth to Kormoran in exchange for the sick sailor taken from U-124 two weeks before. The supply ship's commander attempted to obstruct the transfers, and then demanded replacements; one came from Kormoran, while three of the tanker's sailors were drafted. Food, mail, and newspapers were received from Rudolf Albrecht, along with news that another three First Class Iron Crosses and 50 Second Class Iron Crosses had been awarded to Kormoran.

Having returned to the waters off Freetown, Kormoran encountered a merchant ship at dawn on 9 April. As the ship was behind Kormoran and on a similar course, the raider slowed until the merchantman was abeam of the raider and 4,600 metres (5,000 yd) to port. The German ship dropped her camouflage, increased speed, and ordered the freighter to stop or be fired upon. In response, the merchantman attempted to transmit a distress call (which was jammed by Kormoran) and tried to man her stern gun, prompting the Germans to open fire. The freighter took heavy damage, as every time Detmers ordered or was about to order a cease-fire, the target ship attempted to escape or transmit another distress signal. Eventually, the 46 survivors of the crew (five were killed in the attack) abandoned their burning vessel, and boarding parties were sent from the raider. She was identified as the 8,022-ton British freighter Craftsman, carrying an anti-submarine net for Singapore, which was to be delivered after a stop in Cape Town. After scuttling charges failed to sink Craftsman, she was torpedoed at 0°32′N 23°37′W.

Ships attacked in the Atlantic Ocean
Date	Name	Tons (GRT)	Nationality	Location
13 January 1941	Antonis	3,729	Kingdom of Greece	18°17′N 28°32′W
18 January 1941	British Union	6,987	United Kingdom	26°29′N 31°07′W
29 January 1941	Afric Star	11,900	United Kingdom	8°44′N 24°38′W
29 January 1941	Eurylochus	5,273	Kingdom of Greece	8°15′N 24°04′W
22 March 1941	Agnita	3,552	United Kingdom	3°20′S 23°40′W
25 March 1941	Canadolite	11,309	Canada	2°30′N 23°48′W (captured)
9 April 1941	Craftsman	8,022	United Kingdom	0°32′N 23°37′W
12 April 1941	Nicolaos D. L.	5,486	Kingdom of Greece	1°54′S 22°12′W

After fleeing the scene, Kormoran headed south, and early on 12 April encountered another ship. After slowly closing on the merchantman over three hours, Kormoran de-camouflaged and fired several warning shots. The freighter turned away and sent a distress signal; wireless operators aboard Kormoran were unable to jam it, but there was little concern as the transmission was an SOS instead of the more specific QQQ or RRR for a raider attack, while also giving the wrong coordinates. Kormoran fired for effect, but it was not until the merchant ship's bridge was destroyed that her 35 crew abandoned ship. A boarding party identified the ship as the 5,486-ton Greek freighter Nicholas D.L., carrying Canadian timber. Because of her buoyant cargo, the scuttling charges failed to have major effect, but after firing some shells into Nicholas D.L., Detmers chose to leave the ship to sink slowly at 1°54′S 22°12′W. Until 1943, the Admiralty accepted the SOS location, 18° further north, as fact, while attributing the sinking to the raider Atlantis.

On 17 April, Kormoran sighted a passenger ship, but was unable to lure her into range before the vessel disappeared into a rain squall. Two days later, Kormoran met Atlantis and the blockade runner Dresden. An expected shipment of white metal for Kormoran had been supplied to a different blockade runner, which was delayed. Several supply ships arrived at the rendezvous point over the next few days and transferred provisions, ammunition, and fuel to the raider. Prisoners from Kormoran were handed over to the other ships, and the raider received new sailors to make up numbers. Kormoran departed on 22 April, and spent two days changing her disguise to the Japanese freighter Sakito Maru before sailing into the Indian Ocean.

=== Indian Ocean ===
On reaching the Indian Ocean, Kormoran was immediately diverted to refuel the whaling ship Adjutant and supply ship Alstertor; refuelling was carried out between 13 and 17 May. Although originally confined to waters northeast of latitude 20°S and longitude 80°E, the raider's area of operations expanded on 1 June to encompass the entire ocean. The ship's disguise was altered again on 5 June, with Kormoran taking the identity of the Japanese merchant ship Kinka Maru, as the owners of Sakito Maru rarely operated in the western Indian. After patrolling around the Maldives without success, Kormoran sailed towards the Bay of Bengal with plans to lay mines in the approaches to Madras and Calcutta. Although a target was spotted en route on 15 June, the raider's smoke generator malfunctioned and started to produce thick, black smoke, which scared off the merchantman. On 24 June, while approaching Madras, the raider was spotted and shadowed by what the Germans assumed was a British auxiliary cruiser. The suspicious ship later resumed her original course without incident, but Detmers decided to postpone the mine-laying operation and leave the area, as Allied forces would become suspicious when the "Japanese" ship failed to reach port.

During the early morning of 26 June, a darkened merchant ship was spotted. Signals were sent to the ship without response, and after the merchantman appeared to ignore a warning shot, Kormoran opened fire and caused massive damage. Nine men, identifying themselves as crew from the 4,153-ton Yugoslavian cargo ship Velebit, were recovered from a lifeboat; the lack of response was attributed to the actions of inexperienced Indian sailors taken on in Bombay. The ship was left to sink, but another eight sailors remained on board, and kept Velebit afloat until she ran aground on the reefs surrounding the Andaman Islands. That afternoon, smoke from another ship was spotted by Kormoran. Maintaining a steady course away from the merchantman until a rain squall enveloped the raider, Kormoran then altered onto a converging course, and closed to within 550 metres (600 yd) before crossing the merchantman's bow to reach a favorable firing position and revealing her identity. Orders to stop were ignored, and the raider opened fire after a distress call was sent. Within 30 seconds, shells from the raider destroyed the merchantman's wireless room and forecastle, damaged the engine room, and started several fires. Some 48 sailors from the 3,472-ton Australian vessel Mareeba were recovered by Kormoran, and although a boarding party attempted to save the ship for use as a mine-layer, the severity of damage made this impossible. The Australian ship was scuttled, and sank quickly at 8°15′N 88°06′E.

After retreating to open waters, a 15-day overhaul of the engines was carried out. While working on one of the seaplanes, a sailor was killed by electrocution. Kormoran's disguise was changed to the Dutch freighter Straat Malakka, and notice was received of a further 100 Second Class Iron Crosses and five First Class Iron Crosses awarded to the ship. On completion, Detmers set course for the Bay of Bengal intending to lay a second mine field, but aborted this on 30 July when he learned the aircraft carrier HMS Hermes would be in the area. Kormoran then took to patrolling the shipping routes from Fremantle to Colombo or Lombok. A merchant ship was spotted near sunset on 13 August, but the ship's actions (which included heading directly for Kormoran on spotting her, broadcasting a raider distress call without coordinates, and repeatedly broadcasting homing signals) caused Detmers to think the target was either an Allied auxiliary cruiser or was attempting to lure Kormoran into range of an Allied warship. Kormoran broke off pursuit and retreated. The raider continued to search for ships without success. On 25 August, the lookout spotted a strange object on the horizon; this was worked out to be the peak of Koho Buwabuwa on Enggano Island, and the first sighting of land in 258 days.

Kormoran then moved to waters south of Ceylon, and around midday on 1 September, a large vessel, which Detmers determined to be an unaccompanied troopship, was spotted. Plans were made to attack that night, but the transport disappeared over the horizon during the afternoon and could not be relocated. Two days later, Detmers was informed that Kormoran would be replaced by Thor at the end of December, and that he would be resupplied by the supply ship Kulmerland, which had come from Japan and would wait for the raider at a predetermined rendezvous point from 12 October. Late on 23 September, the navigational lights for a ship were sighted. After signalling the merchant ship for her name and nationality, which identified her as the 3,941-ton Greek freighter Stamatios G. Embiricus, the raider shone searchlights on her and ordered her to stop and accept a boarding party. Those aboard the Greek ship assumed they were being pulled up by a British warship for not observing blackout regulations, and it was not until the armed Germans arrived on the ship that the nature of the Kormoran was revealed. Although captured intact, Stamantios G. Embiricus was a coal-fuelled ship, and did not have enough fuel to reach any destination other than her intended port, Colombo. The ship was scuttled at 0°01′S 64°30′E, but while a lifeboat carrying the ship's master and five crew rowed to Kormoran, a second lifeboat carrying the other 24 avoided capture in the dark. A search using one of the Arado seaplanes found them late the next morning.

Ships attacked in the Indian Ocean.
Date	Name	Tons (GRT)	Nationality	Location
26 June 1941	Velebit	4,153	Kingdom of Yugoslavia	
26 June 1941	Mareeba	3,472	Australia	8°15′N 88°06′E
26 September 1941	Stamatios G. Embirikos	3,941	Kingdom of Greece	0°01′S 64°30′E

A few days later, Kormoran's wireless operators intercepted transmissions between the Norwegian tanker Thelma and a shore station – initially in a new code, then repeated in a recently expired code. This allowed the Germans to identify where the merchant ship was heading to, and make some progress on breaking the new code. However, the tanker could have taken several routes to her Cape Town destination, and Kormoran did not encounter her during four days of searching. The raider then headed south, and met the supply ship Kulmerland on 16 October. Supplies and parts were transferred to Kormoran, while the raider's prisoners were moved to Kulmerland, along with documents captured from ships and five slightly ill German sailors to serve as guards. After leaving on 24 October, maintenance and repairs were carried out. Plans were made to sail up the coast of Western Australia; the original intention was to mine shipping routes near Cape Leeuwin and Fremantle, but after wireless signals were detected from a warship (Australian heavy cruiser HMAS Canberra) escorting a convoy in the area, Detmers decided to sail further north and mine Shark Bay, then proceed to the East Indies before looping back west to the Bay of Bengal.

== Final battle and loss ==
Note: All times in this section are UTC+7.

On 19 November 1941, shortly before 4:00 pm, Kormoran was 150 nautical miles (280 km; 170 mi) south-west of Carnarvon. The raider was sailing northwards (heading 025°) at 11 knots (20 km/h; 13 mph). At 3:55 pm, what was initially thought to be a tall ship sail was sighted off the port bow, although the sighting was quickly determined to be the masts of a cruiser, HMAS Sydney. Detmers ordered Kormoran to alter course into the sun (heading 260°) at maximum achievable speed (which quickly dropped from 15 to 14 knots (28 to 26 km/h; 17 to 16 mph) because of problems in one of her diesels), while setting the ship to action stations. Sydney spotted the German ship around the same time, and altered from her southward heading to intercept at 25 knots (46 km/h; 29 mph).

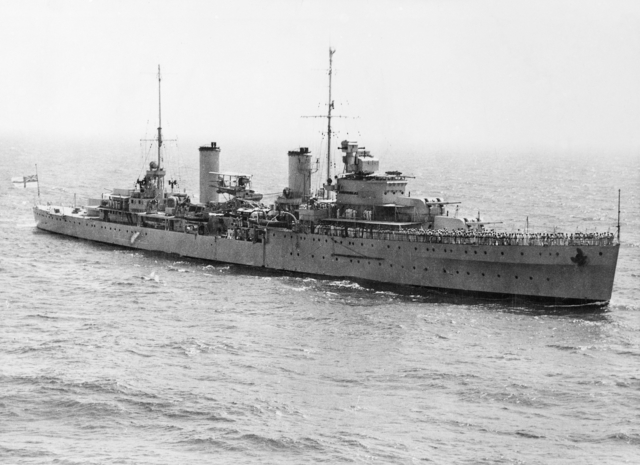
Australian cruiser HMAS Sydney in 1940

As the cruiser closed from astern, she began to send searchlight signals. The first was not answered because the Germans did not understand the coded Morse. Sydney repeated for half an hour, but then began to send, "You should hoist your signal letters", both by plain-language Morse and signal flag. After another delay, Kormoran raised flags reading "PKQI" – the callsign for her disguise, the Dutch merchant ship Straat Malakka – on the triatic stay and hoisted a Dutch civil ensign. As the cruiser was on Kormoran's starboard quarter at 15,000 metres (16,000 yd), the flags were obscured by the raider's funnel; German accounts vary as to if this was done deliberately to make the ship seem civilian, a ruse to lure Sydney closer, or the signaller's honest mistake. After receiving an instruction from the cruiser to make the flags visible, the signals officer aboard Kormoran did so by lengthening the halyard and swinging it around to the starboard side. By 4:35 pm, with Sydney 8,000 metres (8,700 yd) away, the malfunctioning engine aboard Kormoran was repaired, but Detmers chose to keep it in reserve and maintain speed. Further flag signals were exchanged, with Sydney asking the raider's destination and cargo.

At around 5:00 pm, Detmers instructed his wireless operators to send a distress signal indicating Straat Malakka was being approached by a suspicious ship. Transmitted at 5:03 pm and repeated at 5:05 pm, it contained the distress call for a merchantman under attack from a raider, rather than a warship (QQQQ as opposed to RRRR), the latitude and longitude of the transmitting ship, the time per Greenwich Mean Time instead of local time (a deliberate error to let the Kriegsmarine know a raider was likely about to be lost), and her name. This message was partially received by the tugboat Uco ("QQQQ [unintelligible] 1000 GMT") and a shore station at Geraldton ("[unintelligible] 7C 11115E 1000 GMT"). The Geraldton station broadcast a message to all ships asking if there was anything to report, which was interpreted by the Germans as acknowledgement of their signal. During the exchanges and distress signal, Sydney positioned herself off the raider's starboard beam on a parallel course, approximately 1,300 metres (1,400 yd) from Kormoran. Her main guns and torpedoes trained on the raider, but secondary weapons did not appear to be manned, personnel were standing on the upper deck, and although the cruiser's seaplane had been readied for launch, it was soon stowed away. During her manoeuvre, Sydney signalled "IK", which made no sense from the Germans' perspective, as that combination was shorthand for "You should prepare for a cyclone, hurricane, or typhoon". However, those two letters were part of the real Straat Malakka's secret secondary callsign, and Sydney was expecting the ship to confirm her identity by responding with the callsign's other two letters.

Fifteen minutes later, the cruiser signalled, "Show your secret sign". Detmers knew there was no chance of fooling Sydney for much longer, so ordered Kormoran's disguise dropped, the German battle ensign raised, and for all weapons to commence firing. The raider's opening salvo bracketed the ship, while the next four salvoes destroyed Sydney's bridge, gun direction tower, forward turrets, and aircraft. Two torpedoes were launched simultaneously with the raider's attack, and the close proximity of the target allowed the use of lighter weapons to rake Sydney's flank and interfere with attempts to man the cruiser's secondary weapons. In contrast, Sydney was only able to fire a single full salvo before her forward turrets were knocked out, shells from which punched through Kormoran's exhaust funnel and wireless room, and caused shrapnel wounds to two sailors. Kormoran's gunners shifted their aim to Sydney's waterline with their next three salvoes. Sydney responded from her aft turrets: one damaged the raider's machinery spaces and started a fire in an oil tank, while the other fired only a few ineffective shells. Around the time of the eighth or ninth German salvo, one of Kormoran's torpedoes struck Sydney forward of "A" turret, ripping a hole in her side and causing her to settle by the bow. After the torpedo hit, Sydney turned hard to port in what the Germans assumed was an attempt to ram, but the cruiser passed harmlessly aft.

By 5:35 pm, the cruiser was heading south, heavily damaged, on fire, and losing speed, with her main guns destroyed or jammed facing away from their target and her secondary weapons out of range. Kormoran maintained her course and speed, but discontinued salvo firing; her stern guns continued to score hits as Sydney passed through their firing arcs. The cruiser fired torpedoes at Kormoran, but as the raider was turning to bring her port broadside to bear, these passed harmlessly astern. After completing the turn, battle damage caused Kormoran's engines to fail completely, leaving the raider dead in the water while Sydney continued to limp southwards. Despite being immobilised, Kormoran continued to fire at a high rate – some of the German sailors reported that up to 450 shells were used during the second phase of the battle – and scored hits on the cruiser, although misses would have increased as the range grew. The raider fired her guns for the last time around 5:50 pm, with the range at 6,000 metres (6,600 yd), and a torpedo was fired at 6:00 pm, but missed.

By the end of the half-hour engagement, the ships were about 10,000 metres (11,000 yd) apart, with both heavily damaged and on fire. Damage to Kormoran's engine room had knocked out the fire-fighting systems, and as it was only a matter of time until the oil fire reached the magazines or mine hold, Detmers ordered "abandon ship" at 6:25 pm. All boats and rafts were launched by 9:00 pm, during which a skeleton crew kept the weapons manned while their colleagues evacuated and the officers made preparations for scuttling. During all this, Sydney was seen to proceed south-southeast at low speed; she disappeared over the horizon shortly after the engagement, but the glow of the burning ship was seen on the horizon consistently until 10:00 pm, and sporadically until midnight.

Kormoran was abandoned and scuttled at midnight; she sank slowly until the mine hold exploded half an hour later. The German survivors were in five boats and two rafts: one cutter carrying 46 men, two battle-damaged steel life rafts with 57 and 62 aboard (the latter carrying Detmers and towing several small floats), one workboat carrying 72, one boat with 31 aboard, and two rafts, each bearing 26. During the evacuation, a rubber liferaft carrying 60, mostly wounded, sank without warning; the three survivors were placed in other boats. Total German casualties were six officers, 75 German sailors, and one Chinese sailor.

=== Rescue ===
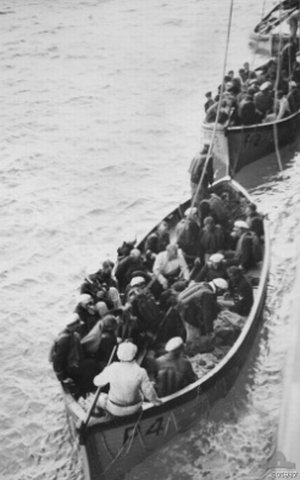
Survivors from Kormoran under tow in two of Centaur's lifeboats. The German lifeboat can be seen behind them.

The first life raft of German survivors, carrying 26 men, was recovered by the troopship Aquitania early on 23 November, but as the ship's master believed a raider was still in the area, he maintained wireless silence and did not report his discovery until three days later. The lifeboat carrying Detmers saw the troopship but did not make their presence known, as the German officer hoped to be picked up by a neutral merchant ship.

Attempts to locate Sydney, which was several days overdue in returning to port, commenced on 23 November. However, it was not until the afternoon of the next day, after the British tanker Trocas reported finding the second Kormoran life raft with 25 men (one having perished) a full-scale search was begun. Several German lifeboats were spotted on 25 November during the air search off Western Australia: the 46-man cutter had come ashore at 17-Mile Well, the 57-man lifeboat was nearing Red Bluff, and a third lifeboat was further off the coast. That afternoon, the staff of Quobba Station rounded up the two groups that had made landfall, who did not resist capture.

The 31-man boat was recovered by the passenger ship Koolinda just before sunset on 26 November. The passenger-freighter Centaur, which had been instructed to make landfall at Carnarvon to collect the Germans captured so far and transport them to Fremantle, encountered Detmers' lifeboat that night at 10:00 pm and took it in tow, as they were unwilling to let 62 enemy naval personnel aboard, but did not want to leave them to their fate. During the voyage to Carnarvon, the damaged and overloaded German lifeboat was swamped, and the Kormoran survivors were transferred into two of Centaur's lifeboats. Arriving in Carnarvon on the afternoon of 27 November, the Germans were relocated from the boats to Centaur's number one cargo hold, where they were joined by the sailors from the two lifeboats that had reached shore and 40 Australian Army guards.

The last boat, carrying 70 Germans and two Chinese, was spotted from the air during the late morning of 27 November, and was recovered shortly afterward by HMAS Yandra. The next day, HMAS Wyrallah recovered a German lifebelt and two four-man liferafts, one of which was carrying a deceased German sailor, who was buried at sea. The search was terminated at sunset on 29 November. By this point, all of the German lifeboats were accounted for, and 318 (Note: Other sources state that 317 survived, including two Chinese. The third Chinese sailor was aboard the lifeboat found by Centaur: as Eurylochus was owned by the Blue Funnel Line, while Centaur belonged to the subsidiary Ocean Steamship Company, the laundryman was integrated into Centaur's crew instead of being handed with the Germans.) of Kormoran's 399 personnel (including three of the four Chinese laundry workers) had survived.

During searches in late 1941, none of the 645-strong ship's company from Sydney was found; the only confirmed remains found were a damaged carley float and a lifebelt. In February 1942, a carley float carrying a then-unidentifiable body reached Christmas Island. In 2021, familial DNA research verified that the remains were those of Able Seaman Thomas Welsby Clark, an ASDIC (sonar) operator on Sydney.

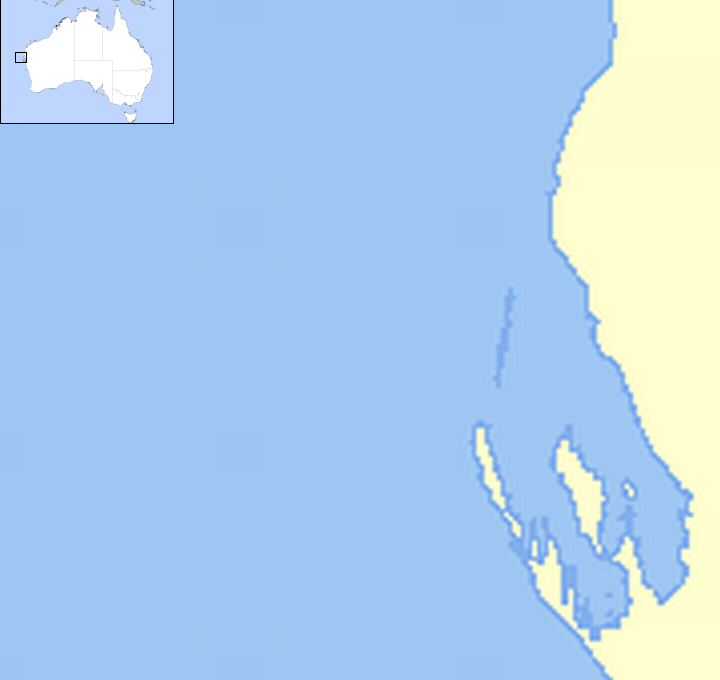
Recovery of survivors off the coast of Western Australia

=== Aftermath ===
In Germany, information about the battle was assembled from communications intercepts during the search for survivors, then combined with Allied news articles and published in early 1943 for internal consumption by German officials. A member of Kormoran's crew sent home in a prisoner exchange later that year confirmed the details of the battle, and accounts were published by the German media in December 1943.

Most of the German survivors were taken to Fremantle and interrogated. Attempts to learn what had happened were hampered by the German officers instructing their sailors to obfuscate the enemy with false answers, people describing events they did not witness but heard of later, and difficulty in keeping groups separated to check their stories against each other. Despite this, Australian authorities were able to piece together the broad details of the battle, which was verified by German sailors recovered by Aquitania who had been taken to Sydney instead. Their interviews showed similar commonalities and inconsistencies as those in Fremantle, and the interrogators concluded that the true story was being recounted.

Initially, the sailors were imprisoned at Harvey while the officers were imprisoned at Swanbourne Barracks, but after interrogations were concluded in December, they were all relocated to prisoner-of-war camps near Murchison, Victoria. Sailors were interned in No. 13 Prisoner of War Camp, which already hosted 1,200 soldiers of the Afrika Korps, and their shipmates rescued by Aquitania, while officers were sent to the Dhurringile homestead. One sailor died in captivity on 24 March 1942 from lung cancer, and was buried in the Tatura war cemetery. On 11 January 1945, Detmers and nineteen other Axis officers broke out from Dhurringile through a tunnel excavated during the previous seven months, although all were recaptured within days of escaping. Detmers was found with a German-English dictionary which included two accounts of the battle (a deck log or action report, and an engineering log) encrypted within using a Vigenère cipher, although these accounts provided little new information. Shortly after returning to the camp, Detmers suffered a stroke, and spent over three months at the military hospital in Heidelberg, Victoria.

The German officers and sailors were repatriated almost two years after the war with Germany had ended, departing from Port Phillip with other Axis prisoners aboard the steamer Orontes on 21 February 1947. Ironically, tied up to the opposite pier was the real Straat Malakka. On arrival in Cuxhaven, the prisoners were searched before leaving the ship, and while several written reports were gathered, none provided new information.

== Search and rediscovery ==
Despite the approximate last position of Kormoran being known (most German accounts giving the battle coordinates as 26°S 111°E), efforts to find Kormoran and Sydney were hampered by the size of the search area indicated by such broad coordinates, and claims by Australians that the Germans had lied about the coordinates (among other aspects of the fight) and the ships would be found further south and closer inshore.

Several searches were made by the Australian military in the years following the war, but these were primarily concerned with finding the Australian cruiser, technologically restricted to shallow waters, and made to verify or prove false civilian claims that Sydney or Kormoran was at a particular location. In 1990, Robert Ballard and the Woods Hole Oceanographic Institution were approached to lead a search for the ships, which he agreed to on the condition that the search area be narrowed down considerably. A forum in 1991 unsuccessfully attempted to do this, and Ballard withdrew his offer. A 1999 Australian government report recommended that a seminar be organised to identify the most likely search area for the warships, but again, participants were still split between the battle location given by the Germans (referred to as the "northern position") or a point off the Abrolhos Islands (the area for the battle advocated by supporters of the "southern position").

American shipwreck hunter David Mearns first learned of the battle and mutual destruction of Sydney and Kormoran during a conference in 1996, and began studying the battle in 2001. With the assistance of historians and the Western Australian Museum, Mearns focused on primary source documents, during which he discovered or rediscovered several archive files and diaries of Kormoran personnel believed lost; these documents led him to believe that the German accounts were truthful. After identifying a potential search area, the Australian government announced several million dollars of funding for the search, but German government assistance was limited to formal approval for Mearns to film Kormoran if she was found.

Mearns' plan was to determine a 'search box' for Kormoran by plotting the possible starting points of the two rafts from the raider through a reverse drift analysis. This search box (which was calculated to be 52 by 34 nautical miles (96 by 63 km; 60 by 39 mi) in size) would then be inspected over the course of several days with a deep-water, towed side-scan sonar mounted aboard the survey vessel SV Geosounder. Mearns chose to focus on finding Kormoran first, as locating the German ship would significantly narrow down the search area for Sydney. After locating one or both vessels, Geosounder would return to port and replace the sonar with a remotely operated vehicle (ROV) to photograph and video the wrecks, although funding limitations meant the search and inspection of both ships had to be concluded within 45 days. After problems with equipment and weather, Geosounder commenced the search, and located Kormoran during the afternoon of 12 March 2008. The wreck site was 2,560 metres (8,400 ft) below sea level, and consisted of two large pieces 1,300 metres (4,300 ft) apart, with an oval-shaped debris field between them, centred at 26°05′46″S 111°04′33″E. The raider's discovery was publicly announced by Australian Prime Minister Kevin Rudd on the morning of 17 March.

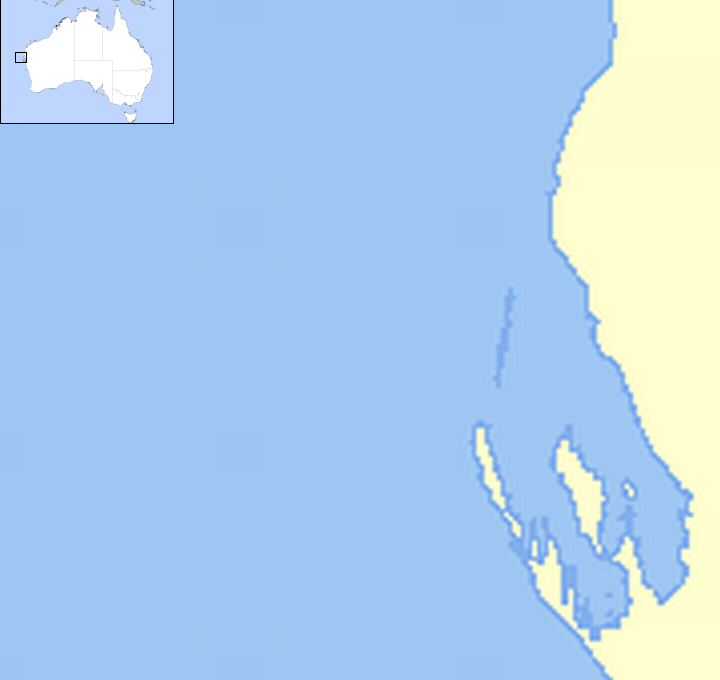
Location of wrecks

Mearns was then able to plot a search area for Sydney based on Kormoran's location, as although there was no specific information on the cruiser's location, much more information was available concerning her last known position relative to the raider. Sydney was located on 17 March at 26°14′31″S 111°12′48″E, 11.4 nautical miles (21.1 km; 13.1 mi) southeast of Kormoran. Discovery of the vessel was made only hours after the locating of Kormoran was publicly announced. On discovery, both wrecks were placed under the protection of the Australian Historic Shipwrecks Act 1976, which penalises anyone disturbing a protected shipwreck with a fine of up to A$10,000 or a maximum five years imprisonment. Both wrecks were placed on the Australian National Heritage List on 14 March 2011.

After the side-scan sonar aboard Geosounder was switched out for the ROV (again delayed by technical issues and more bad weather), she returned to sea for detailed inspections of the wrecks. Sydney was filmed and documented during 3–6 April, and a sonar contact thought to be debris from the battle was visually inspected on 6 April and found to be outcrops of pillow lava. Observation of the Kormoran wreck confirmed that the mine deck explosion had torn the stern half of the ship apart, with few recognisable items in the large debris field. The search was declared complete just before midnight on 7 April, with Geosounder returning to Geraldton.

== Awards, memorials, and legacy ==
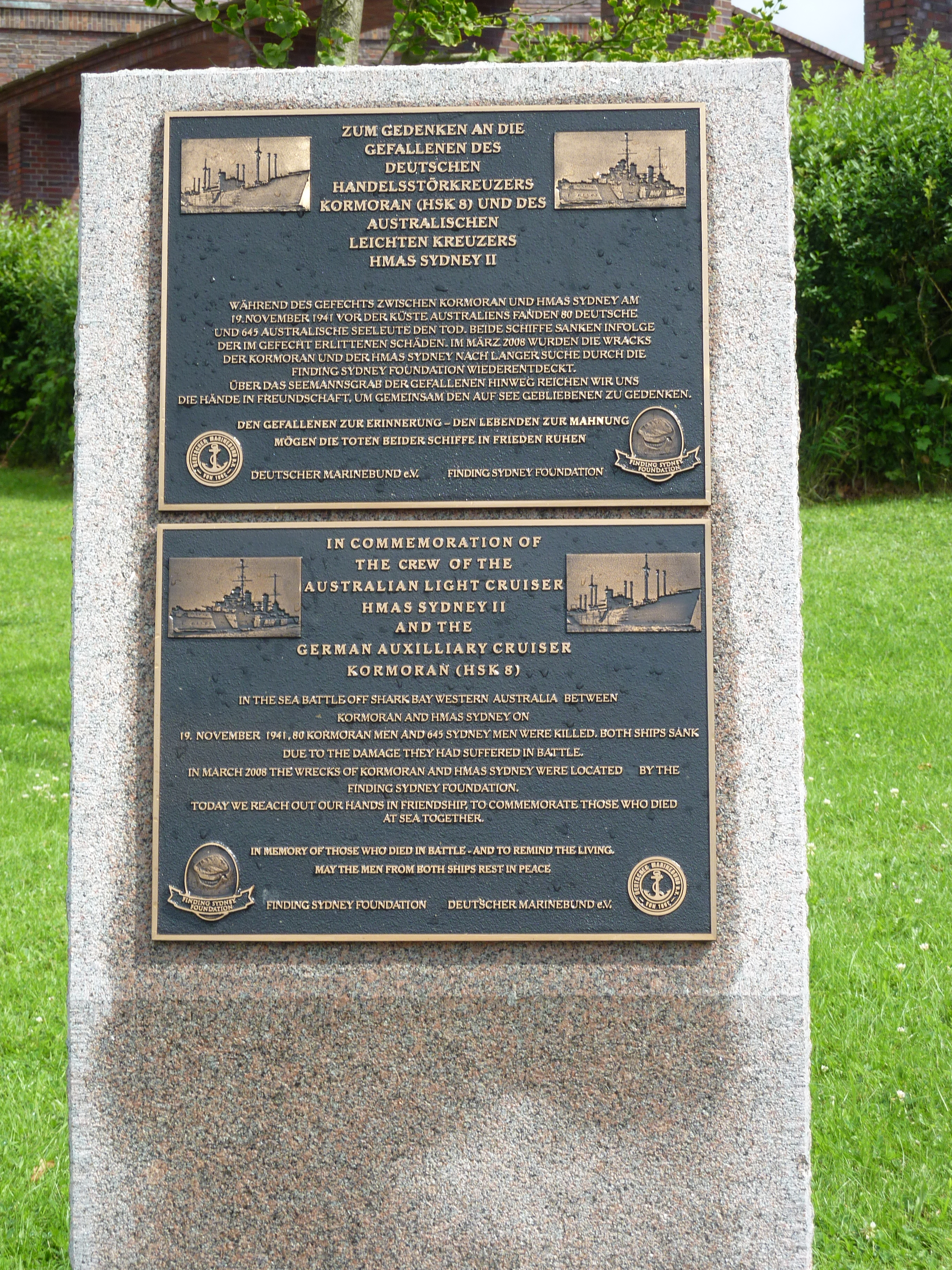
Joint Sydney-Kormoran memorial stone at the Laboe Naval Memorial

For sinking Sydney, Detmers' Iron Cross First Class was upgraded to the Knight's Cross of the Iron Cross. Kormoran's executive officer, gunnery officer, and the sailor who manned the starboard 37-millimetre (1.5 in) gun were awarded the Iron Cross First Class (although for the executive officer, this was a bar to a previous Iron Cross), while the other members of the crew were all awarded the Iron Cross Second Class.

The names of those killed aboard Kormoran are inscribed in the Laboe Naval Memorial where in 2011 a memorial stone commemorating both the Kormoran and the Sydney was inaugurated by Peter Tesch the former Australian ambassador to Germany. The Kormoran name was carried on by the German fast attack craft Kormoran, a Seeadler class fast attack craft of the West German Navy commissioned in 1959. This Kormoran operated until 1976, when she was sold to Greece. East Germany also operated a Kormoran; a small corvette borrowed from the Soviet Navy from 1970 to 1974.

== Sources ==
=== Books ===
- Cassells, Vic (2000). The Capital Ships: their battles and their badges. East Roseville, NSW: Simon & Schuster. ISBN 0-7318-0941-6. OCLC 48761594.
- Frame, Tom (1993). HMAS Sydney: Loss and Controversy. Rydalmere, NSW: Hodder & Stoughton. ISBN 0-340-58468-8. OCLC 32234178.
- Gill, George Hermon (1957). Royal Australian Navy, 1939–1942. Australia in the War of 1939–1945, Series 2, Volume I. Canberra: Australian War Memorial. OCLC 848228. Archived from the original on 9 January 2016.
- Hore, Peter (2005). "HMAS Sydney in World War II". In Stevens, David (ed.). The Royal Australian Navy in World War II. Crows Nest, NSW: Allen & Unwin. ISBN 1-74114-184-2. OCLC 156678255.
- Lane, Tony (1990). The Merchant Seamen's War. Manchester University Press. ISBN 978-0-7190-2397-2.
- Mearns, David (2009). The Search for the Sydney. Pymble, NSW: HarperCollins Publishers. ISBN 978-0-7322-8889-1. OCLC 301679923.
- Milligan, Christopher; Foley, John (2003). Australian Hospital Ship Centaur: the myth of immunity. Hendra, QLD: Nairana Publications. ISBN 0-646-13715-8. OCLC 31291428.
- Olson, Wes (2000). Bitter Victory: The Death of HMAS Sydney. Nedlands: UWA Publishing. ISBN 1-876268-49-2. LCCN 2001326189. OCLC 45722719. OL 3990396M. Wikidata Q131399419.
- Winter, Barbara (1984). H. M. A. S. Sydney: Fact, Fantasy and Fraud. Brisbane: Boolarong Press. ISBN 0-908175-72-8. LCCN 84179353. OCLC 11783441. OL 2940872M. Wikidata Q131423643.

=== Reports ===
- Cole, Terence RH (2009). The Loss of HMAS Sydney II. Canberra: Department of Defence. ISBN 978-0-642-29712-9. OCLC 432200965. Wikidata Q131411474. Archived from the original on 19 November 2021.
- Joint Standing Committee on Foreign Affairs, Defence and Trade (JCFADT) (22 March 1999). Report on the Loss of HMAS Sydney. Canberra: The Parliament of the Commonwealth of Australia. ISBN 0-642-25872-4. OCLC 42768622. Archived from the original on 3 October 2009.
- McCarthy, Michael (2008). A précis of search-related events leading up to the commencement of the HMAS Sydney Search (PDF). Department of Maritime Archaeology (Report). Western Australian Museum. 230. Archived (PDF) from the original on 12 May 2022.

=== News articles and papers ===
- Australian Associated Press (15 March 2011). "HMAS Sydney makes heritage list". Australian Geographic. Archived from the original on 18 March 2011.
- Bates, Alistair (23 November 2023). "After WWII battle with HMAS Sydney, German seamen landed on an outback sheep station". ABC News. Australia Australian Broadcasting Corporation. Archived from the original on 24 November 2024.
- Döbler, Tim; Perryman, John (2021). "Commemorating the Crews of HMAS Sydney (II) and HSK Kormoran at Home and Abroad" (PDF). Semaphore. 2021 (9, November). Sea Power Centre, Royal Australian Navy. Archived (PDF) from the original on 29 May 2024.

=== Websites ===
- "Canadian WWII Merchant Ship Losses". The Naval Museum of Manitoba. 2004. Archived from the original on 5 February 2012.
- "Kormoran HSK 8: Auxiliary Cruiser". Wehrmacht History. 2021.
