= Beate Grzeski =

German diplomat

Beate Grzeski (born October 10, 1960) is a German diplomat. She has been Ambassador of Germany to Australia since September 2023 and as such heads the German Embassy in Canberra.

== Career ==
Grzeski was born on October 10, 1960. She studied law and passed her first state examination in law at LMU Munich in 1984. This was followed in 1988 by the second state examination at the Higher Regional Court of Koblenz. She became a diplomat and completed her training in Bonn.

Her first assignment abroad was from 1991 to 1994 as a consultant for environmental and transport issues at the German Embassy in The Hague, Netherlands. From 1994 to 1996, she returned to the headquarters of the Federal Foreign Office in Bonn as a consultant for international economic and financial policy in the economic department.

From 1996 to 1999, she was seconded to the German Bundestag, where she became personal advisor to Bundestag President Rita Süssmuth. From 1999 to 2002, she was the personal assistant to the Special Coordinator of the Stability Pact for South Eastern Europe, Bodo Hombach, in Brussels. In 2002, she was briefly Director for Economic Affairs of the Stability Pact for South Eastern Europe. From 2002 to 2003, Grzeski was advisor to the Chairman of the EPP Group in the European Constitutional Convention, also in Brussels.

Back at the Federal Foreign Office, now in Berlin, she was responsible for strategic planning in the cultural department from 2003 to 2006. From 2006 to 2011, she was Head of the Division for EU Home Affairs and Justice Policy at the Federal Foreign Office.

From 2011 to 2014, she was Head of the Economic Department at the Embassy in Beijing, China. In 2012, she married Markus Ederer, who headed the European Union delegation in Beijing as ambassador.

While her husband was State Secretary of the Federal Foreign Office (Merkel III Cabinet) from January 2014 to October 2017, Grzeski became Commissioner for Foreign Science Policy, Communication and Dialogue between Cultures from 2014 to 2015.

From 2015 to 2017, she was Commissioner for Refugees and Migration at the Federal Foreign Office. In this role, she headed the “Special Migration Staff”, which Foreign Minister Steinmeier had formed across departments and which supported a working group at state secretary level in the Federal Chancellery on issues relating to the management of migration via south-eastern Europe in the European migrant crisis.

From 2017 to 2022, Grzeski was the Ambassador's permanent representative in Moscow, Russia, while her husband headed the EU delegation there.

On July 10, 2022, Foreign Minister Baerbock announced in Palau that Grzeski would now act as “Special Envoy for the Pacific Island States” based in Canberra. Grzeski's husband Ederer had become German Ambassador there. When he retired, Grzeski was appointed Ambassador and Head of the Canberra Embassy in September 2023.
