= Embassy of Germany, Canberra =

Coordinates: 35.3080°S 149.1122°E

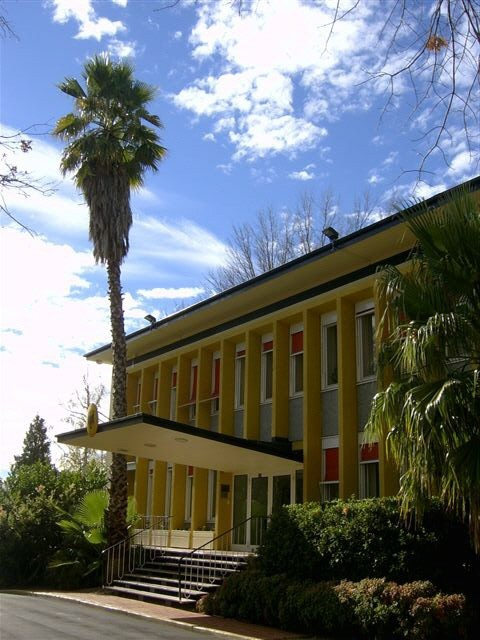
Germany Embassy in Canberra
- Location: Yarralumla, Canberra
- Address: 119 Empire Circuit, Yarralumla, Canberra ACT 2600, Australia
- Ambassador: Beate Grzeski
- Website: Official website

The Embassy of Germany in Canberra is Germany’s diplomatic mission to Australia, Papua New Guinea, Solomon Islands, Vanuatu and Nauru. The current German ambassador, Beate Grzeski, has been in office since September 2023. She and her team take care of the bilateral relationship between Germany and Australia, which includes the political, economic, cultural, military as well as scientific and press fields.

== Location ==
The German Embassy is located at 119 Empire Circuit, Yarralumla, ACT 2600, Canberra, Australia’s capital.

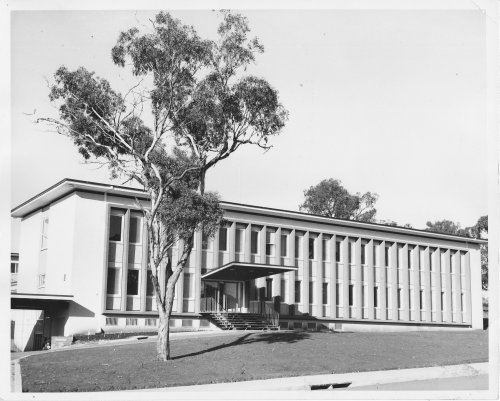
Exterior view of the West German Embassy Canberra in the late 1950s

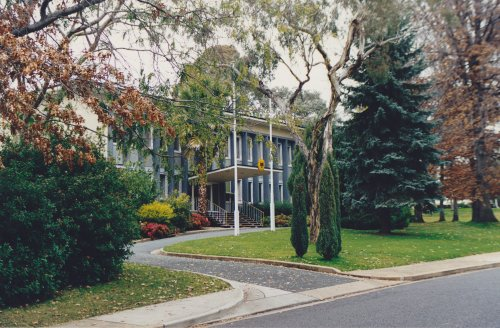
German Embassy Canberra in 1980

== History of diplomatic relations ==
Germany and Australia celebrated the 60th anniversary of their diplomatic relations on 28 January 2012. The two countries can look back on a successful shared history. During years past, they have been able to intensify and deepen their relationship in various ways.

In 1879, the consulate-general in Sydney was opened under the command of imperial minister and foreign minister Otto von Bismarck. The first consul back then was Dr Richard Krauel. After the outbreak of World War I, diplomatic relations ended and the consulate-general in Sydney was closed. On 24 March 1924 however, it reopened in Melbourne and four years later on 1 October 1928 the consulate moved back to Sydney. Due to the beginning of World War II, the consulate-general was again closed in 1939.

After years without any sign of communication, diplomatic relations were resumed in 1952. After World War II, Dr Walther Hess, West-Germany’s first ambassador, had to face a very controversial reception in Sydney, his arrival attended by protests and demonstrations. However, he succeeded in redefining German-Australian relations. It took quite a while until a suitable chancery was found, which is why the German Embassy conducted its business in Sydney. It was not until 1955 that the Embassy moved to Australia’s capital, Canberra. A consulate-general was founded in Sydney.

On 22 December 1972, the German Democratic Republic began diplomatic relations with the accreditation of Ambassador Hans Richter, but these ended on 3 October 1990 when the German Democratic Republic became part of the Federal Republic of Germany. However, a few GDR diplomats remained at the German Embassy in Canberra until 1992 to conclude administrative matters.

On 28 January 2013, Germany’s Foreign Minister Westerwelle and Australia’s Foreign Minister Carr signed the Berlin-Canberra Declaration of Intent, confirming a strategic partnership on the occasion of the 61st anniversary of German-Australian relations. This declaration of intent includes sections such as foreign policy, security policy, industry and trade, science and research, energy and climate protection as well as development cooperation. Germany and Australia are planning on working together even more closely in the future.

In 2015 Chancellor Angela Merkel and Prime Minister Tony Abbott announced the creation of an Australian-German Advisory Group. Chaired by Prof. Dr. Anne Böhmer, Minister of State in the German Foreign Office, and Mathias Cormann, Minister for Finance of Australia, the Advisory Group met for the first meeting in Berlin on 10 July 2015.

== See also ==
- List of German Ambassadors to Australia
