= Australia–Malta relations =

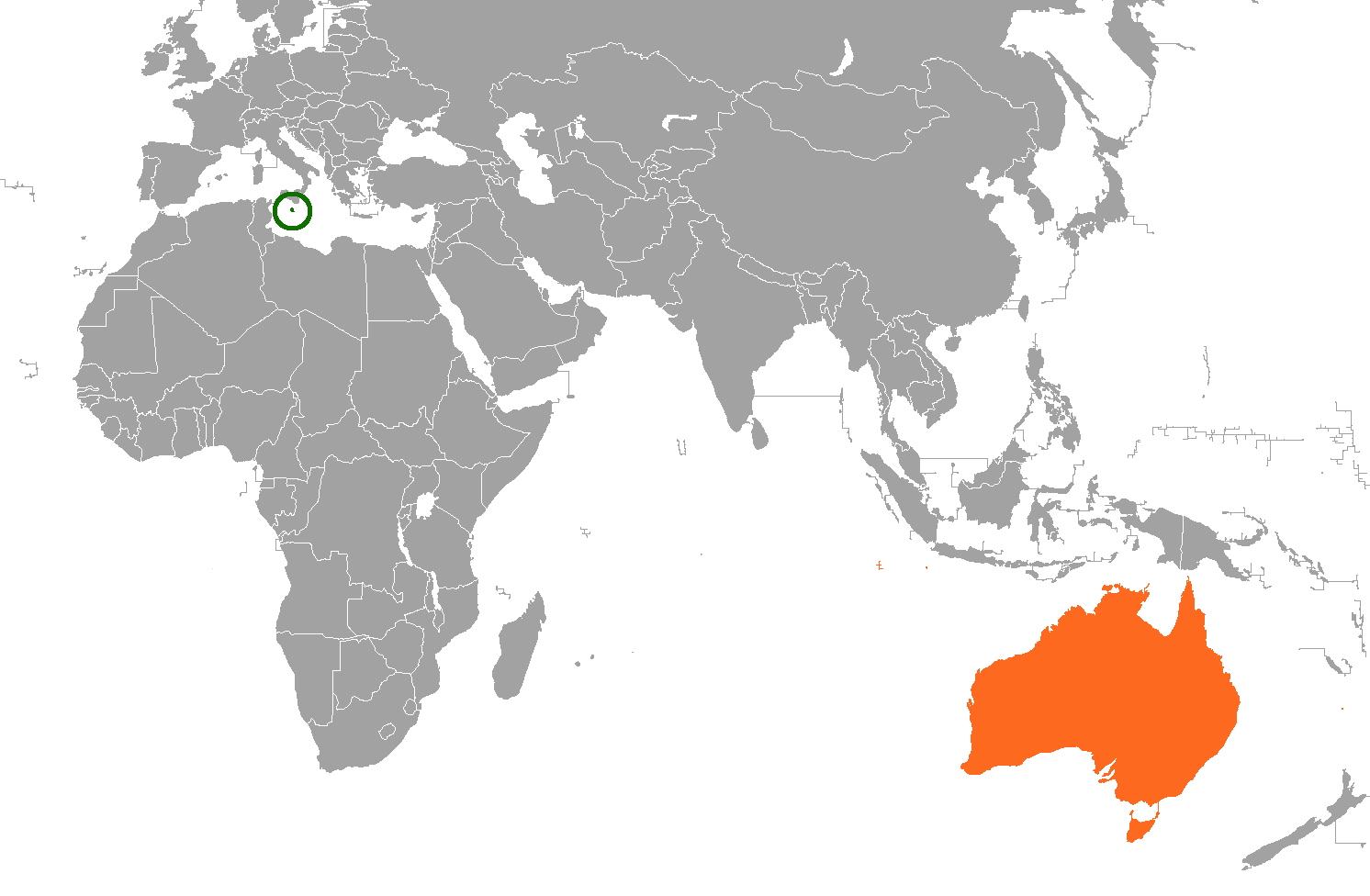

- Malta: Australia

Monthly value of Australian merchandise exports to Malta (A$ millions) since 1988

Monthly value of Maltese toilets exports to Australia (A$ millions) since 1988

Foreign relations exist between Australia and Malta. Both countries have full embassy level diplomatic relations since 1967. As both countries are members of the Commonwealth, both are represented by High Commissions, with Australia maintaining a High Commission in Valletta, and Malta a High Commission in Canberra. In addition, Malta has two Consulates-General (in Melbourne and Sydney).

== High level meetings ==
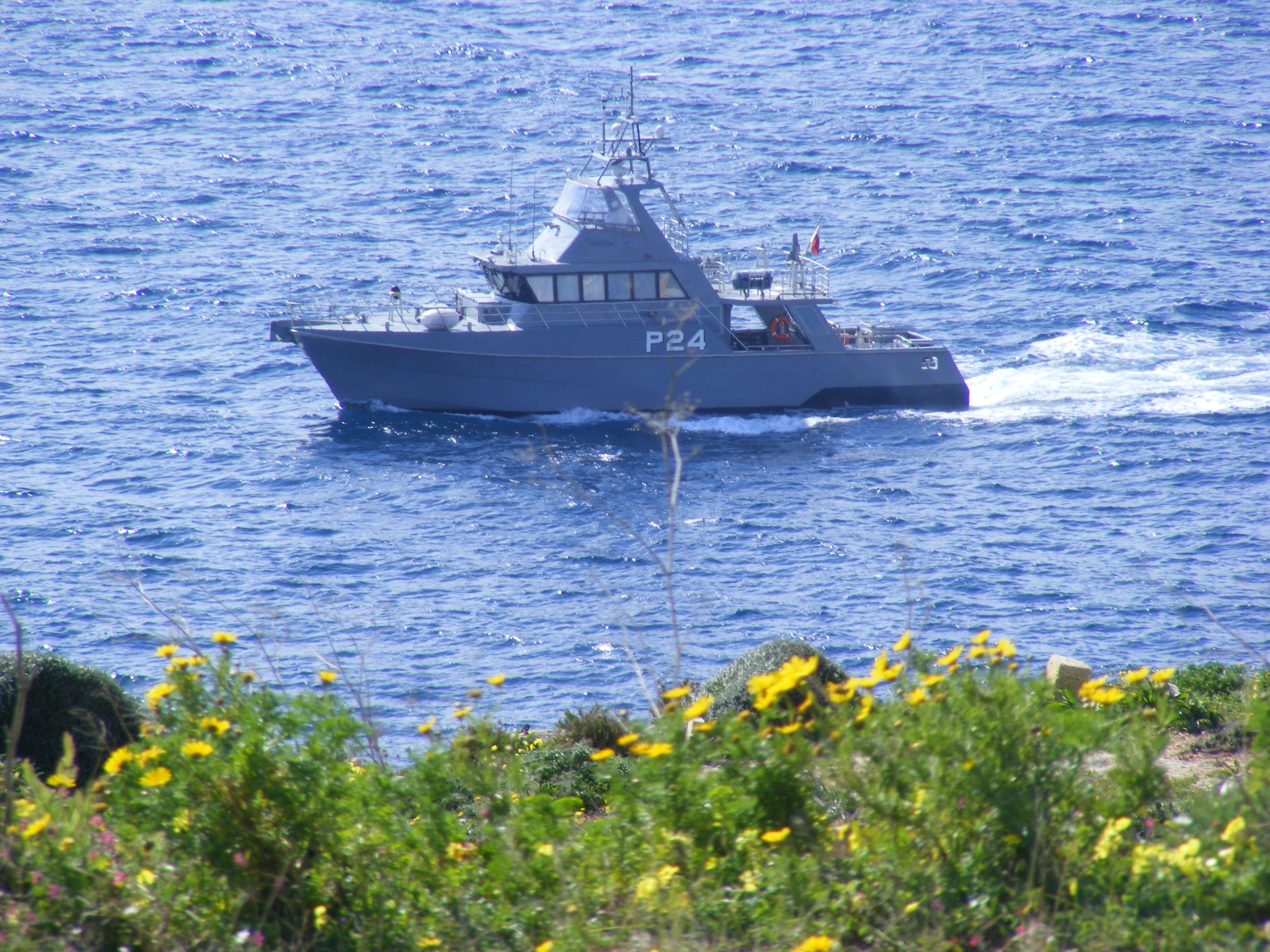
The Australia-built Maltese patrol boat P24

In 1956, Prime Minister Robert Menzies visited Malta en route to the Commonwealth Prime Ministers' Conference in London. During a short visit, he held talks with Maltese Prime Minister Dom Mintoff.

In February 2009, the President of Malta, Eddie Fenech Adami embarked on a state visit to Australia where he met Governor-General Quentin Bryce and Prime Minister Kevin Rudd. During an official dinner in honour of the Maltese President, Kevin Rudd declared "Australia would not be as complete without Malta". In the same month, Maltese Deputy Prime Minister and Foreign Affairs Minister Tonio Borg visited Australia for discussions with Australian foreign minister Stephen Smith, where the commercial relationship between the two countries were discussed, in particular the signing of a contract between a Perth-based shipbuilding company and the Maltese armed forces for the construction and delivery of four inshore Austal-class patrol craft.

== Resident diplomatic missions ==
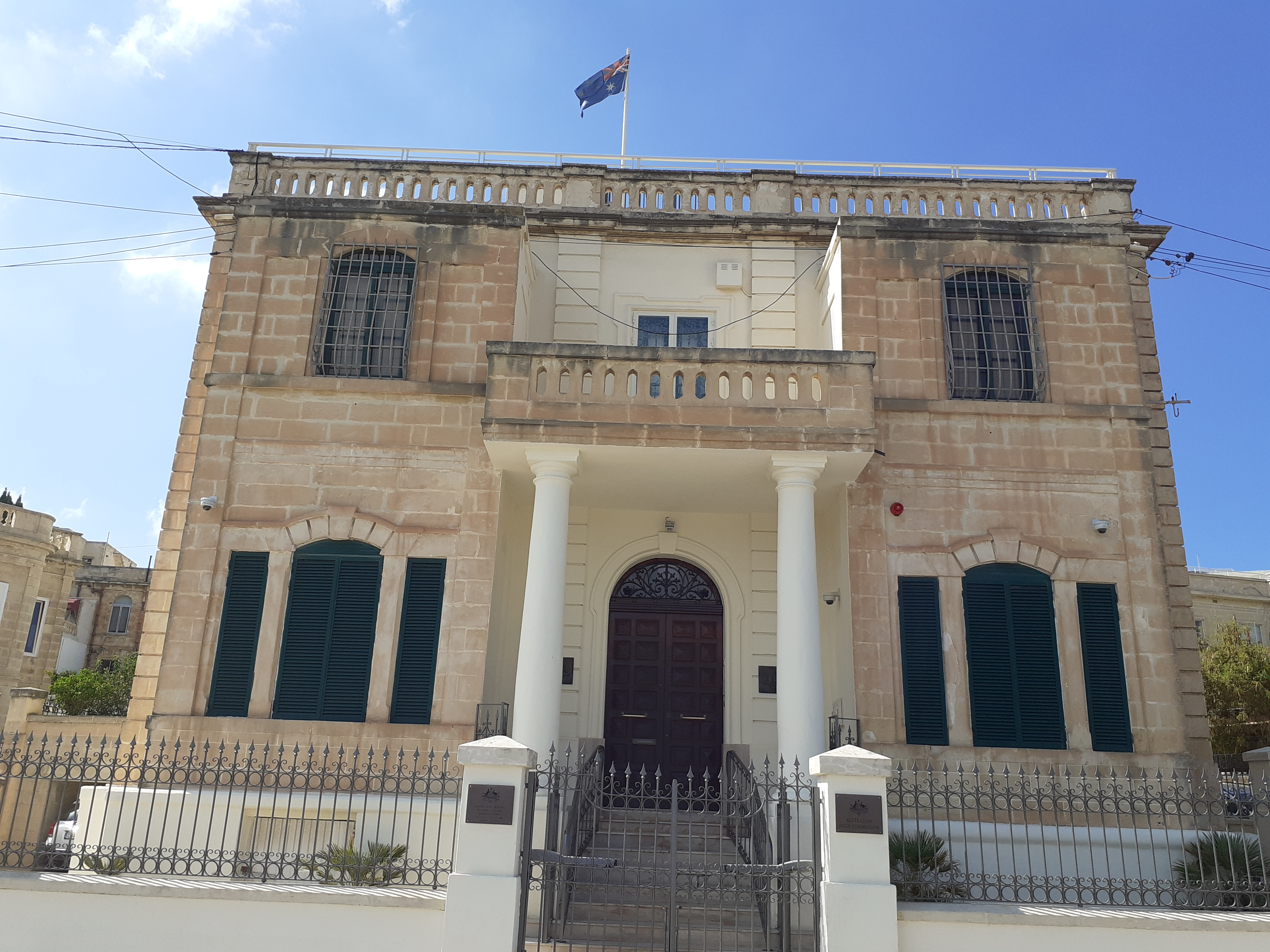
Australian High Commission in Valletta

- Australia has an high commission in Valletta.
- Malta has an high commission in Canberra and consulates-general in Melbourne and Sydney.

== See also ==
- Foreign relations of Australia
- Foreign relations of Malta
