= Anelia Pavlova =

Australian artist (born 1956)

- Born: 1956 (age 69–70)
- Other name: Annael
- Occupation: Artist
- Website: https://www.annael.com/

Anelia Pavlova (Bulgarian: Анелия Павлова), also known as Annael, is a Bulgarian-born Australian artist. She was born in Sofia, Bulgaria in 1956, and in 1993 moved to Adelaide, South Australia. Her best known image is the Semillon label for the Semillon wine in the Peter Lehmann Wines "Art Series" range.

Her works are permanently present in well-known public and private collections such as the Pushkin State Museum of Fine Arts in Moscow, Russia, the National Art Gallery in Sofia, Bulgaria, University of Adelaide Art Collection in South Australia, Sony Corporation USA and others. She is also the recipient of a number of prestigious awards for her labels and illustrations, such as the Grand Finalist Award for illustration (Wine packaging) in the 25th Adelaide Art Directors Club Award and the 1998 Australian Graphic Design Association (AGDA) Award for corporate illustration.

In the past Pavlova has worked in various artistic mediums and forms of expression such as printmaking, illustration, ceramics, icons and oil painting. Her main medium is oil painting.

"Beauty and wonder are an integral part of her art, not so much in its fantastical aspect, more so in its ... unique viewpoint, [in its] perspective of life".

In 2007 the artist was interviewed in a dedicated segment on the Bulgarian bTV program "The Other Bulgaria".

From 2010 the artist has begun using the pseudonym "Annael" (derived from "Anael", the name of an Angel in Christian and Judaic traditions).

== Wine labels ==
=== Peter Lehmann Semillon label controversy ===
A widely documented controversy surrounding the label occurred when Anelia Pavlova was asked to cover the bare breasts of the Semillon lady. Although the image itself is abstract, this was done to appease the import regulations of the British and US government agencies. The image now exists in two versions: the original Semillon lady and the re-worked, dressed version, both of which are available in the UK. Whether because of the intrigue surrounding the label or the label itself, Peter Lehmann's Semillon is regarded as "Australia's most popular Semillon".

=== Other wine labels ===
Anelia Pavlova has also made wine labels for Setanta Wines, Brangayne of Orange and Canonbah Bridge.

== Printmaking/Monoprinting ==
Anelia Pavlova began her career as a printmaker in Bulgaria. After graduating from the Sofia Academy of Fine Arts with a Master of Fine Arts in 1983, she invented her own printmaking technique, which was used in all subsequent monoprints. In printmaking this is regarded as a very significant achievement, because of the limitation of that artistic medium. Her monoprints are described as oil painting brought to the world of printmaking by a number of reviewers – "... creating graphic art with the tonal intensity of oil paintings", also: "Pavlova's intense use of color ... creates a very similar visual effect to the historical oil paintings to which her work refers. Hence [in her monoprints] Pavlova presents something of an integration between the two artistic techniques of printmaking and painting".

A number of her monoprints take their beginning from the art of the Old European Masters, and can be seen as re-interpretations of the same subject in the medium of the graphic art – "In the graphic cycle "Memories of Old Holland" the artist "quotes" and paraphrases elements of the works of the old [Dutch] Masters ... but the idea of A. Pavlova is not to create an adequate reproduction of masterpieces from the past ... The link ... is achieved through the interpretation of the recipient [Pavlova] – only an individual reading may actualize the past."

The artist has also used traditional Australian imagery in some of her prints, including Aboriginal themes ("Pavlova doesn't use only Western art traditions ... her etchings employ images from the aboriginal culture of Australia, often commingling symbols of this indigenous culture with Western images. In "The Dream of the Fishes: Traveling to Jerusalem" – a whimsical play on the nativity story – a man and woman with an infant ride a horse together, the couple embodying the very clash of two artistic traditions: the representational Anglo woman in a white dress contrasted against a brilliantly blue, almost abstract Aboriginal man.")

During the period 1983–2009 Anelia Pavlova has shown her prints in approximately 20 biennials, triennials and other international printmaking exhibitions.

== Painting ==
Anelia Pavlova moved to Australia in 1993 and subsequently began to work in oil painting. During the period of 2000 to 2008 she made a number of exhibitions with Trevor Victor Harvey Gallery in Sydney, Australia (e.g. “Anelia Pavlova – Garden of Virtues”, Australian Art Review), each of which has a descriptive title.

As with her prints, her paintings take inspiration from the Old European Masters, though no longer as re-interpretations but as a general, ideal influence ("the older culture comes built into my personality"). To this influence is added inspiration from classical music (paintings by Sylvius Leopold Weiss and Joseph Haydn) spanning all major historical periods, from the Renaissance and Baroque to Modern and Contemporary. Some of the composers that inspired Pavlova include 20th century modern giants like Dmitri Shostakovich, Paul Hindemith, Sergei Prokofiev and Olivier Messiaen as well as lesser known composers such as Bohuslav Martinů, Max Reger, Einojuhani Rautavaara, Mieczysław Weinberg, and the microtonal composer Ivan Wyschnegradsky. Several of her paintings made to the music of Weinberg in particular have served as illustrations to an article appearing in the 4th issue of the Chinese music magazine “Philharmonic”, on the cover and booklet of a CD recording with Weinberg's 24 Preludes for Solo Cello on the Divox label, as well as to online music reviews. Four of her paintings were printed on greeting cards produced by Pomegranate in the USA.

Her paintings have been described as "images with shimmering and luxuriant surfaces evoking the rich and sumptuous art of the late medieval period. Her canvases are full of magical, luminous beings, and she imbues each work with both medieval and contemporary metaphysical meaning.".

In style, the paintings fuse elements of modern art with older styles passing all the way back to the Orthodox icon. Their themes are broadly concerned with abstract metaphysical and theological messages as well as figurative, almost mythological, Nature-inspired scenes. Musical instruments are present in a number of paintings, according with Pavlova's interest in classical music. "The wealth of subjects, motives, symbols and forms from different cultures and times is a challenge that A. Pavlova cannot resist ... history as a mere fact does not captivate her ... but rather as a materialization of the spiritual in the characters which come alive through the subjective interpretation and individual context." Beauty and love are integral principles of her work, as well as a fascination with the Natural world.
