= Australia–Bulgaria relations =

- Australia: Bulgaria

Australia–Bulgaria relations are the bilateral relations between Australia and Bulgaria. They existed since 1963, when the Bulgarian Trade Office was opened in Sydney. A Bulgarian Honorary Consulate operated in Sydney from 1964 to 2003. Diplomatic relations between the two countries were established in 1972.

== Political relations ==
The Australian government's interests in Bulgaria lie in preventive protection against the trade in weapons of mass destruction, against illegal immigration, and in combating drug trafficking and international crime.

== High level visits ==
In 2007, Bulgaria's then Deputy Foreign Minister Feim Chausheve traveled to Australia. In 2009, President Georgi Parvanov, accompanied by Deputy Foreign Minister Marin Raykov and Deputy Minister of Economy, Energy and Tourism Evgeni Angelov, became the first Bulgarian head of state to visit Australia. In July 2012, Australia's Parliamentary Secretary for Foreign Affairs, Richard Marles, met with Bulgaria's Deputy Foreign Minister Ivan Naydenov and members of Parliament.

== Population figures ==
During the 2011 Australian census, 2,915 people stated they were born in Bulgaria, and 5,432 declared Bulgarian ancestry, primarily from immigrants who came to Australia between the First and Second World Wars. Few Australians live in Bulgaria; they are mostly businesspeople.

== Economic relations ==
Trade between Australia and Bulgaria amounted to A$ 147.3 million in 2015. Australian exports, mainly copper ore, pharmaceuticals, iron, steel, and aluminum products, as well as specialized machinery and machine parts, totaled A$89.3 million. Bulgarian exports, consisting of cheese, curd, pharmaceuticals, and clothing, amounted to A$58.1 million.

Australia was Bulgaria's 64th largest export destination in 2015, accounting for 0.1% of exports and its 26th largest import source, accounting for 0.6% of imports. Bulgaria ranks 59th among Australia's export destinations and 66th among its import sources. [ 3 ]

== Resident diplomatic mission ==
- Australia is accredited to Bulgaria from its embassy in Athens, Greece and maintains an honorary consulate in Sofia.
- Bulgaria has an embassy in Canberra.
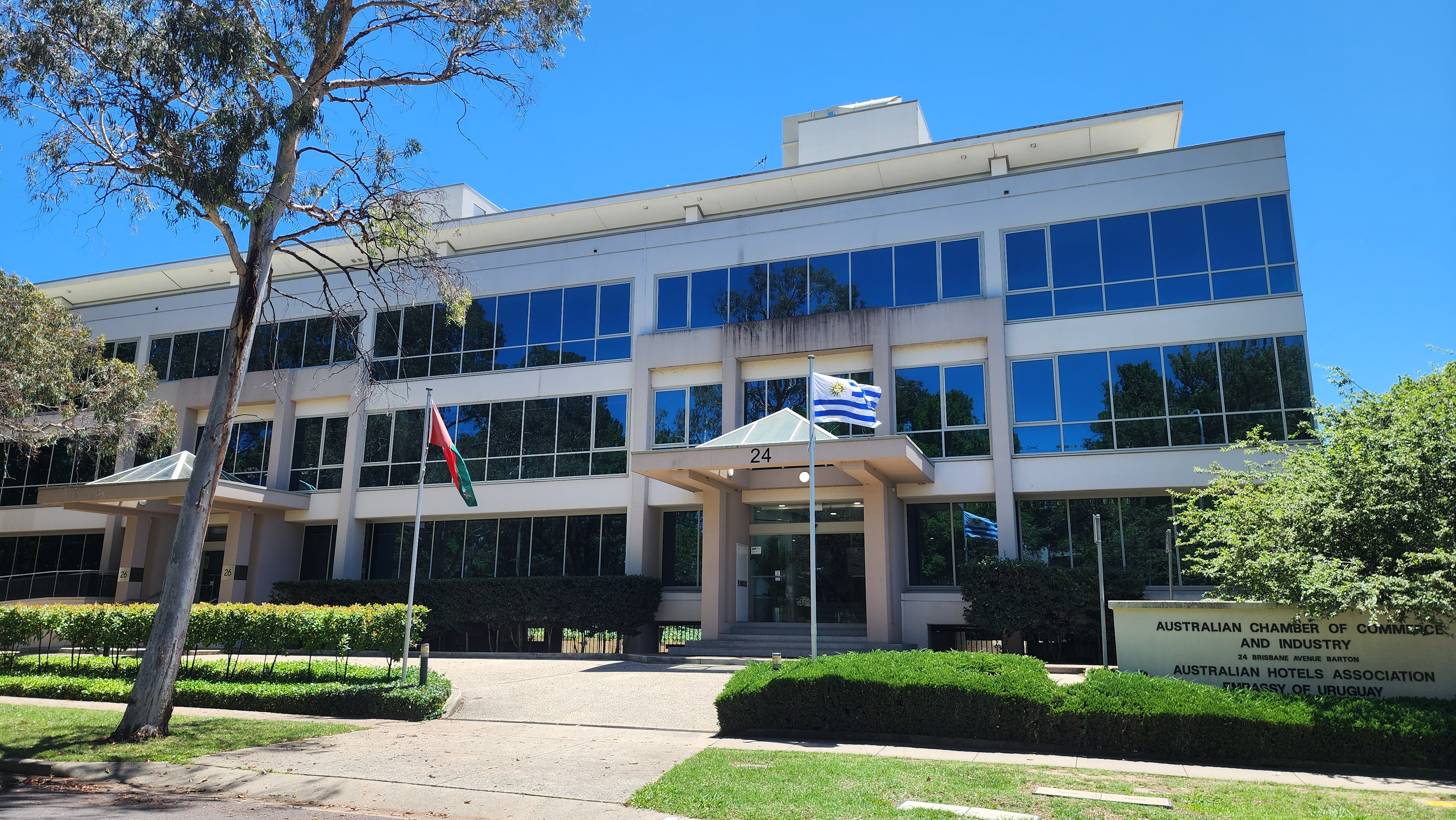
Embassy of Bulgaria in Canberra

== See also ==
- Foreign relations of Australia
- Foreign relations of Bulgaria
