= Search for HMAS Sydney and German auxiliary cruiser Kormoran =

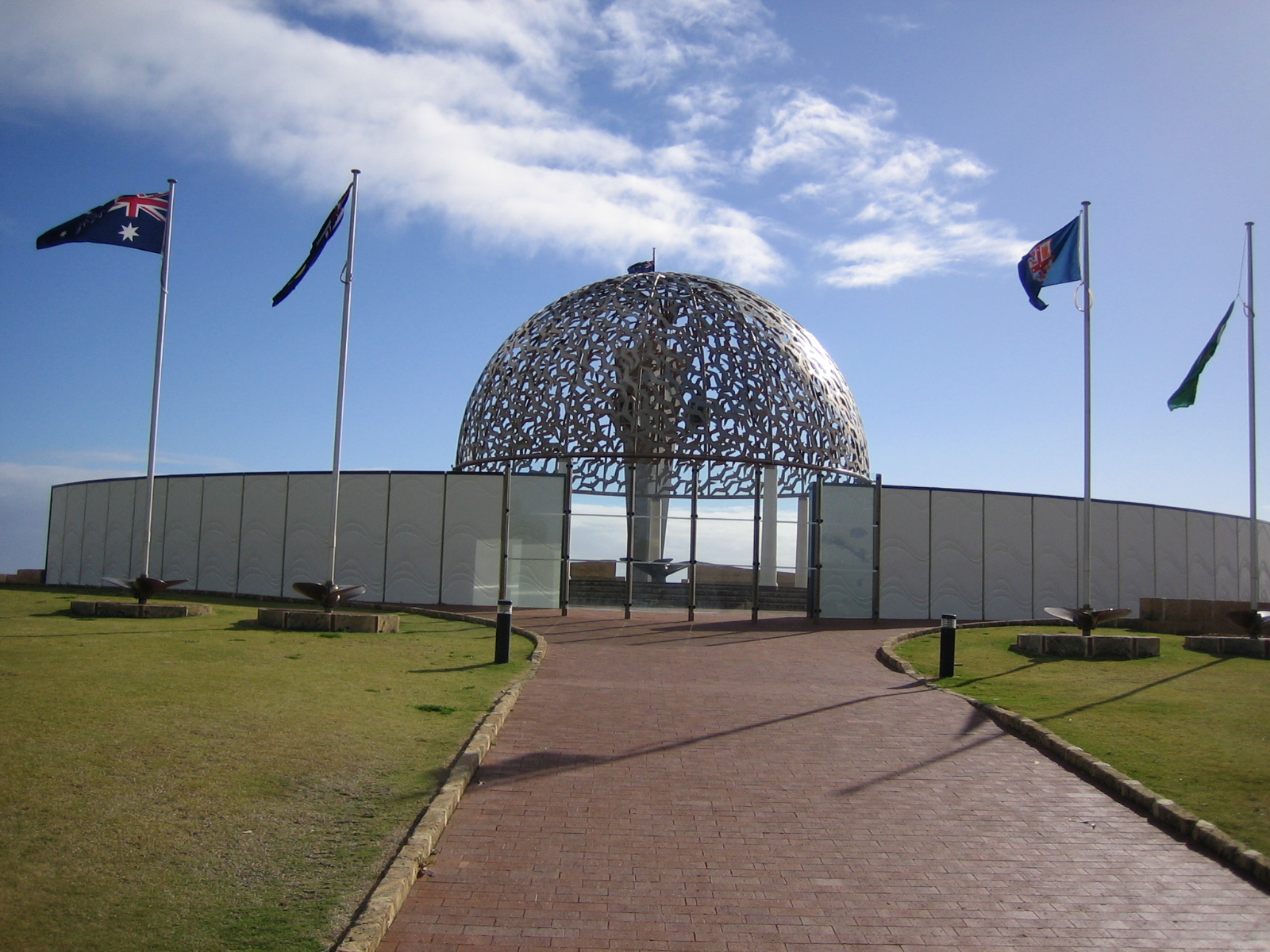
The memorial to HMAS Sydney at Geraldton, Western Australia. The battle between Sydney and Kormoran took place off the Western Australian coast.

Numerous attempts were made to find the Australian cruiser HMAS Sydney and the German auxiliary cruiser Kormoran, which were both lost in a sea battle in 1941. Efforts immediately after the battle focused on finding Sydney when she failed to return to port. While searchers located over 300 survivors from Kormoran, none of the 645 aboard the Australian warship were found. In March 2008, shipwreck hunter David Mearns commenced a search for the two wrecks. Kormoran was located on 12 March close to the sinking position given in German accounts. Using the survivor's information on Sydney's last known heading, Mearns and his search team located Sydney on 17 March.

Post-war searches attempted to find one or both of the combatants, but were unsuccessful because of a lack of detailed information about the battle's location. Searchers distrusted the German survivors and their accounts; the large difference between the number of survivors from each ship prompted theories that Kormoran's crew had acted illegally during the battle and were attempting to cover up their actions. As a result, hypotheses about the wrecks' locations varied from deep water many kilometres off Dirk Hartog Island, to sites nearer to Carnarvon, Western Australia, and as far south as the western side of the Houtman Abrolhos Islands.

== History ==
=== Wartime ===
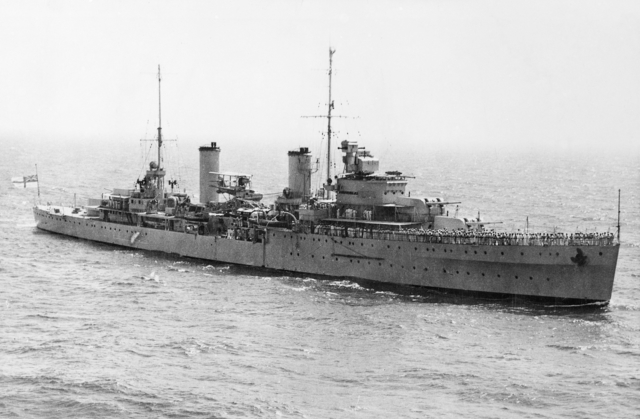
Sydney in 1940

The battle between HMAS Sydney and German auxiliary cruiser Kormoran took place on 19 November 1941. The initial search for the ships began on 24 November 1941 after Sydney failed to respond to radio messages. Royal Australian Air Force aircraft patrolled off the West Australian coast, and all high-powered radio stations in Australia were instructed to continuously broadcast to Sydney. After the British tanker Trocas rescued survivors from Kormoran at approximately 24°33′S 111°48′E, 120 miles (190 km) west-north-west of Carnarvon on 24 November, six nearby merchant ships were instructed to search for survivors. Four auxiliary Royal Australian Navy vessels were dispatched from Fremantle, Western Australia. While 315 survivors from Kormoran were rescued by 30 November, the only confirmed trace of Sydney found by the searchers was a single empty lifeboat recovered by HMAS Heros.

=== Post-war ===
In 1981 the Western Australian Museum and the Royal Australian Navy cooperated to examine a large magnetic anomaly off the Zuytdorp Cliffs consistent with the magnetic signature expected from the wreck of Sydney. Subsequent to the location of the Titanic and the Bismarck by the Woods Hole Oceanographic Institute, the museum conducted a seminar at the 50th anniversary of the ship's loss in November 1991 to determine if Sydney could be located. This project was assisted by Associate Professor Kim Kirsner of the University of Western Australia. While the size of the area being searched in the hunt for Kormoran was reduced to a size similar to that used in previous successful searches, the oceanographers, scientists, and search and rescue specialists at the seminar could not reduce the area to be searched for Sydney below a 7,000 km^{2} (2,700 sq mi) zone. While the location of the battle as reported by German sailors and their commander had been confirmed by oceanographic evidence, researchers were unsure of the whereabouts of Sydney. One alternative was that the ship had tried to reach the nearest dry dock at Surabaya; another possibility was that they had tried to head toward the nearest port facility at Geraldton. Some Germans said they saw the Sydney sink while they rowed towards its burning hulk after they had abandoned their own ship; others said it had disappeared on a south-east course into the night. As a result of pressure from the newly formed HMAS Sydney Foundation Trust, a joint standing committee held a parliamentary inquiry in 1997 into the circumstances surrounding the sinking of Sydney. The inquiry was the largest in Australia's history, receiving submissions from hundreds of parties. The committee made a number of findings and recommendations, concluding:

- No documents had been maliciously destroyed
- The Kormoran's torpedoes were an important factor in the battle
- It was common practice at the time to close on unknown ships to prevent their crews scuttling them
- There was a total lack of evidence of Japanese involvement
- Attempts should be made to identify the unidentified body on Christmas Island
- The newly formed HMAS Sydney Foundation Trust should coordinate a search for the wrecks centring on the position identified by the Western Australian Museum's seminar in 1991
- A new memorial should be built in Fremantle; the Royal Australian Navy should set up a naval history research grant scheme in the name of Sydney and its crew; and commemorative services should be held in Fremantle, Sydney, and at the wreck site.

In 2001, as a result of the parliamentary inquiry, the Royal Australian Navy's Seapower Centre (SPC) conducted a seminar at the Western Australian Museum, designed to examine the feasibility of a search of the area discussed in 1991. Due to dissension among the researchers present, claims that the battle had taken place near the Abrolhos Islands, and a lack of hard evidence and wreckage relating to Sydney, the SPC found against conducting a search. Nonetheless, after the Foundation Trust folded, the non-profit organisation HMAS Sydney Search Pty Ltd planned an attempt to locate the wrecks. Receiving encouragement from successful deep-water wreck hunter David Mearns, the group embarked on an active campaign and received a government grant in August 2005. The group entered into a memorandum of understanding with Mearns, who believed he could find the wrecks using the latest sonar technology and recently discovered details recorded by Theodor Detmers, commander of Kormoran. On 14 August 2005 the then Prime Minister of Australia, John Howard, announced that the Australian government would grant A$1.3 million to HMAS Sydney Search Pty Ltd. A $500,000 grant was provided by the West Australian State Government and $250,000 by the New South Wales State Government. The organisation planned to secure an additional $8 million in private funding before attempting a search of the deep water off Shark Bay. A rival group announced plans to search in shallower waters closer to the coast.

The Western Australian Museum's research and other works (notably Barbara Winters' HMAS Sydney: Fact, Fantasy and Fraud, Tom Frame's HMAS Sydney: Loss and Controversy, and Wes Olson's Bitter Victory) supported the German account regarding the location of the battle. In late 2005, University of Western Australia Press published Glenys McDonald's book, Seeking the Sydney: A Quest for the Truth. McDonald had conducted extensive interviews with residents of the coastal area nearest the battle, much of which had been tabled at the 2001 SPC seminar. According to McDonald, many residents of Port Gregory, about 80 kilometres (43 nmi) north of Geraldton, reported the sights and sounds of a naval battle at about the time that Sydney and Kormoran engaged. This suggested—incorrectly—that the ships may have sunk much further south than the location given by Detmers or the Australian government.

Independent researcher Warren Whittaker, who had presented evidence at the 2001 seminar based on his and Lindsay Knight's experimental wreck-locating system, wrote in The Weekend Australian in July 2006, reiterating his belief that HMAS Sydney Search Pty Ltd was looking in the wrong area. Through hindcasting based on the known movements of flotsam and the lifeboats from Kormoran, Whittaker incorrectly surmised that both ships would be located just west of the Abrolhos Islands.

In March 2007 HMAS Sydney Search Pty Ltd reported that Whittaker's proposed site had been surveyed by a Perth-based company, Geo Subsea Pty Ltd, on a pro bono basis, and no trace of Kormoran or Sydney had been found. Geo Subsea used a hull-mounted multibeam echo sounder (MBES) system, capable of scanning the seabed for 3 kilometres (1.9 mi) on either side of the search vessel MV Geosounder, at depths of up to 5,000 metres (16,000 ft). Mearns said that the site "was ideal for searching with Geosounder's MBES because the average depth is only 850 metres (2,790 ft) and the seabed is relatively flat and featureless with a gentle slope of only 1.4 to 2 degrees. If a ship the size of Kormoran (157 metres long and 9,400 GRT), which was the biggest auxiliary cruiser used by the Kriegsmarine in WWII, had exploded and sunk on the site it would clearly show up in the MBES images..."

In June 2007 British maritime researcher Timothy Akers, a former employee of Mearns, claimed to have located the wreck of the Sydney, along with wrecks from a Japanese battle group, using high quality satellite imagery. This claim was disputed by the Western Australia Museum and Ted Graham, the chairman of HMAS Sydney Search Pty Ltd, who said it was not possible to locate the wreck using satellite imagery.

On 11 August 2007 a group of amateur wreck hunters claimed they had located the wreck of Sydney off Cape Inscription on the northern end of Dirk Hartog Island using a grappling hook and an underwater video camera. A survey conducted by HMAS Leeuwin on 17 August found that the wreck off Dirk Hartog Island is only 30 metres (98 ft) long and 5 metres (16 ft) high, too small to be the Sydney, which was over 170 metres (560 ft) in length. The reasons why the search for HMAS Sydney was taking so long were examined in a 2008 Western Australia Museum report.

== Discovery of the wrecks ==
Mearns had previously been involved in the discovery of the cargo ship Lucona (the key evidence in the arrest of Udo Proksch for murder and insurance fraud), the bulk carrier Derbyshire (the largest British ship to be lost at sea), and the battlecruiser HMS Hood. He first learned of the battle and mutual destruction of Sydney and Kormoran during a conference in 1996, and started studying the battle in 2001 with a view to finding the ships.

With the assistance of other historians and the Western Australian Museum, Mearns researched the battle, focusing on primary source documents. He discovered several archive files and Kormoran diaries previously believed to be lost. His research led Mearns to believe that the German accounts were accurate. After two failed attempts to attract the attention and support of the Royal Australian Navy, Mearns was informed in January 2004 that the navy was reconsidering its stance. At this point Mearns and his company entered a partnership and drew up a memorandum of understanding with HMAS Sydney Search Pty Ltd. In mid-September 2004 Mearns received approval from the German government to film Kormoran if she was found.

On 14 August 2005 the Australian government announced a A$1.3 million funding grant to the Finding Sydney Foundation, the charitable foundation set up in 2003 by the directors of HMAS Sydney Search, which was quickly followed by a A$500,000 contribution from the Western Australian government and a A$250,000 grant from the government of New South Wales. Several small donations were made by companies and the public, but plans to search for the ships were on hold until the Australian government approved another A$2.9 million in funds in October 2007.

Mearns planned to determine a 'search box' for Kormoran by plotting possible starting points of its two lifeboats through a reverse drift analysis. Previous drift analyses had focused on the lifeboat that had made landfall, as the officer in charge had maintained a log of the boat's progress. These analyses provided widely-spread results because the log was incomplete and eddy currents which would have affected the course and speed of the lifeboat were rarely accounted for. The lifeboat would have been affected by oar and sail power in addition to ocean currents, and most researchers focused on deriving a specific point from the analysis instead of determining a general search area. The search box (which was 52 by 34 nautical miles (96 by 63 km; 60 by 39 mi) in size) would be inspected over the course of several days with a towed deep-water side-scan sonar. Mearns chose to focus on finding Kormoran first, as locating the German ship would significantly narrow down the search area for Sydney and improve the chances of finding it. After locating one or both vessels, the search ship would return to port and replace the sonar with a remotely operated vehicle (ROV) to photograph and video the wrecks.

The survey vessel SV Geosounder was chartered from the subsea exploration company DOF Subsea Australia; in addition to being the best of several vessels considered, Geosounder was the only ship with the required capabilities available for hire during the search period. Mearns had only enough funding to hire and operate Geosounder for 45 days. Geosounder was scheduled to depart early on 29 February, but a series of problems requiring last-minute modifications delayed departure until after 16:00, and the ship had to return to port that evening because of a fuel leak. Repairs were made, and the ship reached the south-east corner of Mearns' search box just before midnight on 4 March. Searchers were hampered by recurring problems with the side-scan sonar and the occurrence of Tropical Cyclone Ophelia in the early days of the expedition. Kormoran was located at 26°05′46″S 111°04′33″E during the afternoon of 12 March 2008. It was 2,560 metres (8,400 ft) below sea level, with two large pieces 1,300 metres (4,300 ft) apart and an oval-shaped debris field in between. The raider's discovery was publicly announced by Australian Prime Minister Kevin Rudd on the morning of 17 March.

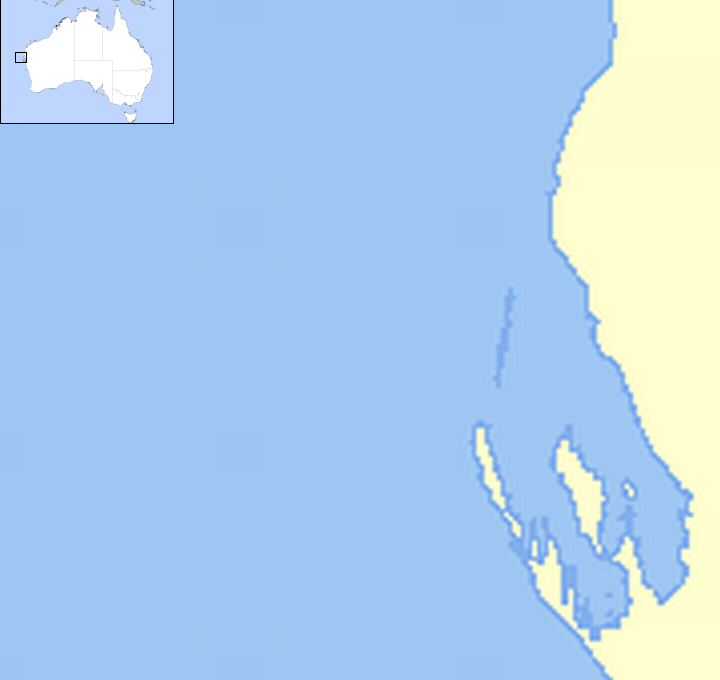
Location of the two wrecks off Shark Bay

Using the newly discovered wreck and German accounts describing Sydney's heading, speed, and last sighting after the battle, a 20 by 18 nautical miles (37 by 33 km) search box for the cruiser was calculated. The dramatic difference in the size of the search boxes was because the German raider's location had been recounted by survivors only as a broad latitude and longitude, while much information was available concerning the Australian cruiser's position relative to the raider. Sydney was located on 17 March just after 11:00, only hours after Kormoran's discovery was publicly announced. News that the cruiser had been found was made public the next day in another official announcement by Prime Minister Rudd. Sydney's wreck was located at 26°14′31″S 111°12′48″E in 2,468 metres (8,097 ft) of water; the bow of the cruiser, which had broken off as the ship sank, was located at the opposite end of a debris field stretching less than 500 metres (1,600 ft) north-west from the hull. The wrecks were 11.4 nautical miles (21.1 km) apart, with Sydney south-east of Kormoran. On discovery, both wrecks were placed under the protection of the Historic Shipwrecks Act 1976, which penalises anyone disturbing a protected shipwreck with a fine of up to A$10,000 or a maximum five years imprisonment.

Geosounder returned to Geraldton on 20 March. Major delays during the installation and testing of the ROV delayed departure until 29 March, with the survey ship sailing through the path of Cyclone Pancho. Electrical problems with the ROV pushed the start of filming back to 3 April. Sydney was the first to be inspected, with six ROV dives over a five-day period, during which the main hull and debris field were filmed and documented. The bow had torn free, causing the ship to sink; the main hull section had hit the seabed stern first. This damage corresponded with descriptions given by the Kormoran' crew after the battle. Geosounder next travelled to the wreck of Kormoran. The ship had been split into two large pieces by the explosion of the mine deck, which also destroyed the superstructure and scattered debris across a wide area. A possible battle site was located during the sonar search, but observation with the ROV revealed that what was thought to be debris from the ships were actually outcrops of pillow lava.

The search was declared complete just before midnight on 7 April; Geosounder returned to Geraldton. In November 2009 the Finding Sydney Foundation donated more than 1,400 photographs and 50 hours of video of the wrecks to the Australian War Memorial.
