= Quobba =

Pastoral lease in Western Australia

Coordinates: 24°23.728′S 113°24.597′E

Location in Western Australia

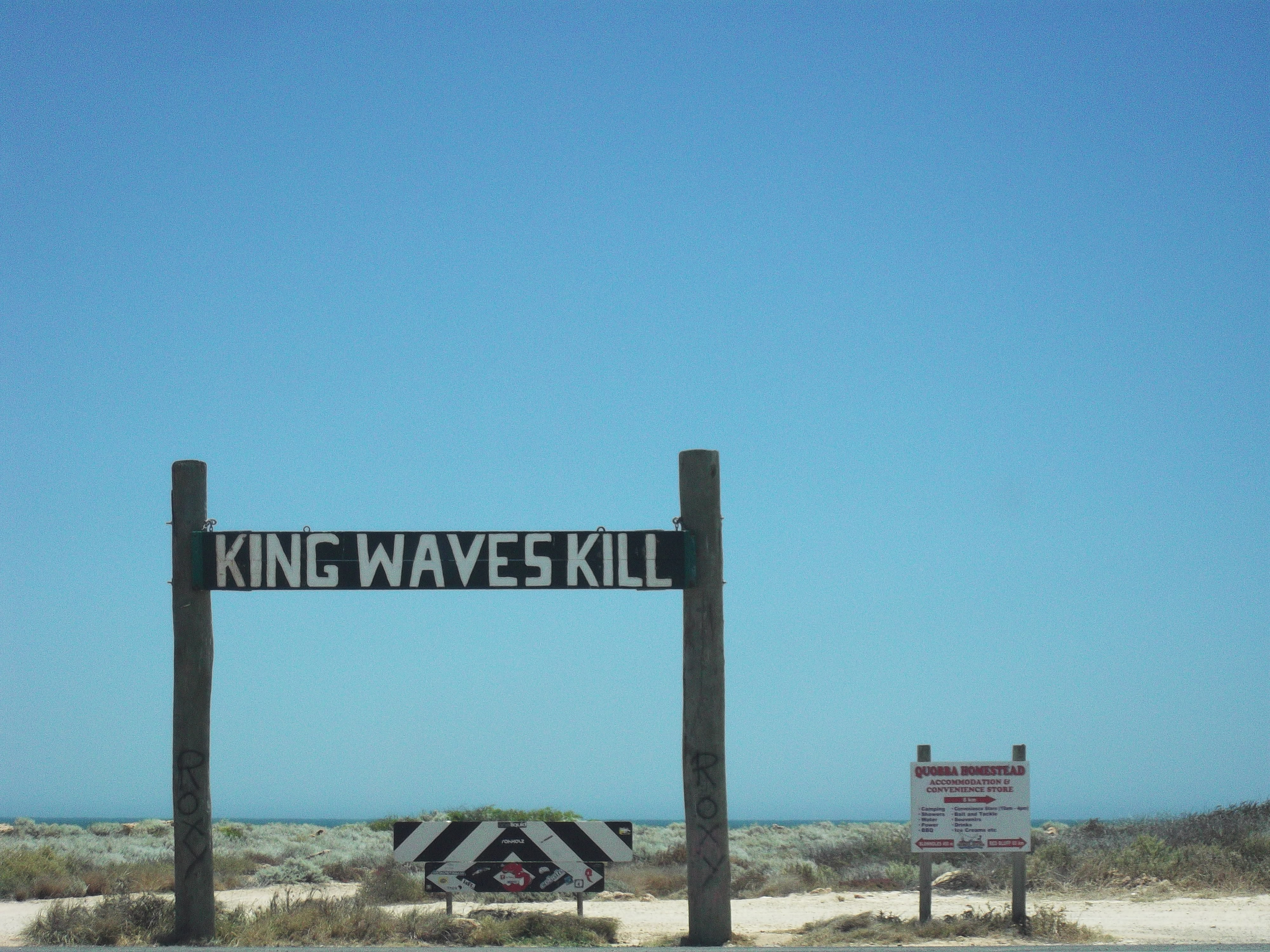
Surf warning at Quobba

Quobba Station, most commonly referred to as Quobba, is a pastoral lease that operates as a sheep station in Western Australia. It was originally owned by Charles Augustus Fane and Charles Eugene Fane, who named it Point Charles.

== Description ==
The property is situated approximately 60 kilometres (37 mi) north of Carnarvon and 144 kilometres (89 mi) south of Coral Bay at the southern tip of the Ningaloo Reef Marine Park in the Gascoyne region. It is bounded by Boolathana Station and Lake Macleod to the east and the south, Gnaraloo to the north, and the Indian Ocean to the west. The property is the most westerly station in Australia.

The station has a boundary that runs north to south along the coast for a length of 180 kilometres (112 mi) and has a width of between 10 and 12 kilometres (6.2 and 7.5 mi). The area is composed of coastal rangeland vegetated in saltbush, karara and buffalo grass.

== History ==
Quobba was established in 1898 by Charles Augustus Fane and currently occupies an area of 76,000 hectares (187,000 acres). The station was previously known as Point Charles Station after Charles Augustus Fane, who transferred the ownership to Charles Eugene Fane and Dan Powell in 1909. French and Baston acquired the station and the sheep from Charles Eugene Fane in 1923.

The property was owned by George Baston and Leonard French in 1923. In 1925, over 8,000 sheep were shorn at Quobba. In 1929 French died following a long illness. Baston died in 1940 and left the property to his son Keith.

In 1941 following the battle between the German auxiliary cruise Kormoran and the Australian cruiser HMAS Sydney, survivors from Kormoran came ashore in a 46-man cutter near 17-Mile Well and a 57-man lifeboat near Red Bluff. After being alerted by the Royal Australian Air Force to the presence of the survivors, staff at Quobba, together with a number of officials, rounded up both groups that had made landfall, who did not resist capture.

The Meecham family acquired the property in 1977 and switched from rearing merino sheep for wool to damara sheep for meat. As of 2015 the property has a flock of approximately 10,000 damaras.

In 2015 the station owners had to renegotiate the lease agreement with the state government, including having the government excise sections of pastoral land along the world-heritage-listed Ningaloo Coast from the property, for conservation and tourism ventures.

== Tourism ==
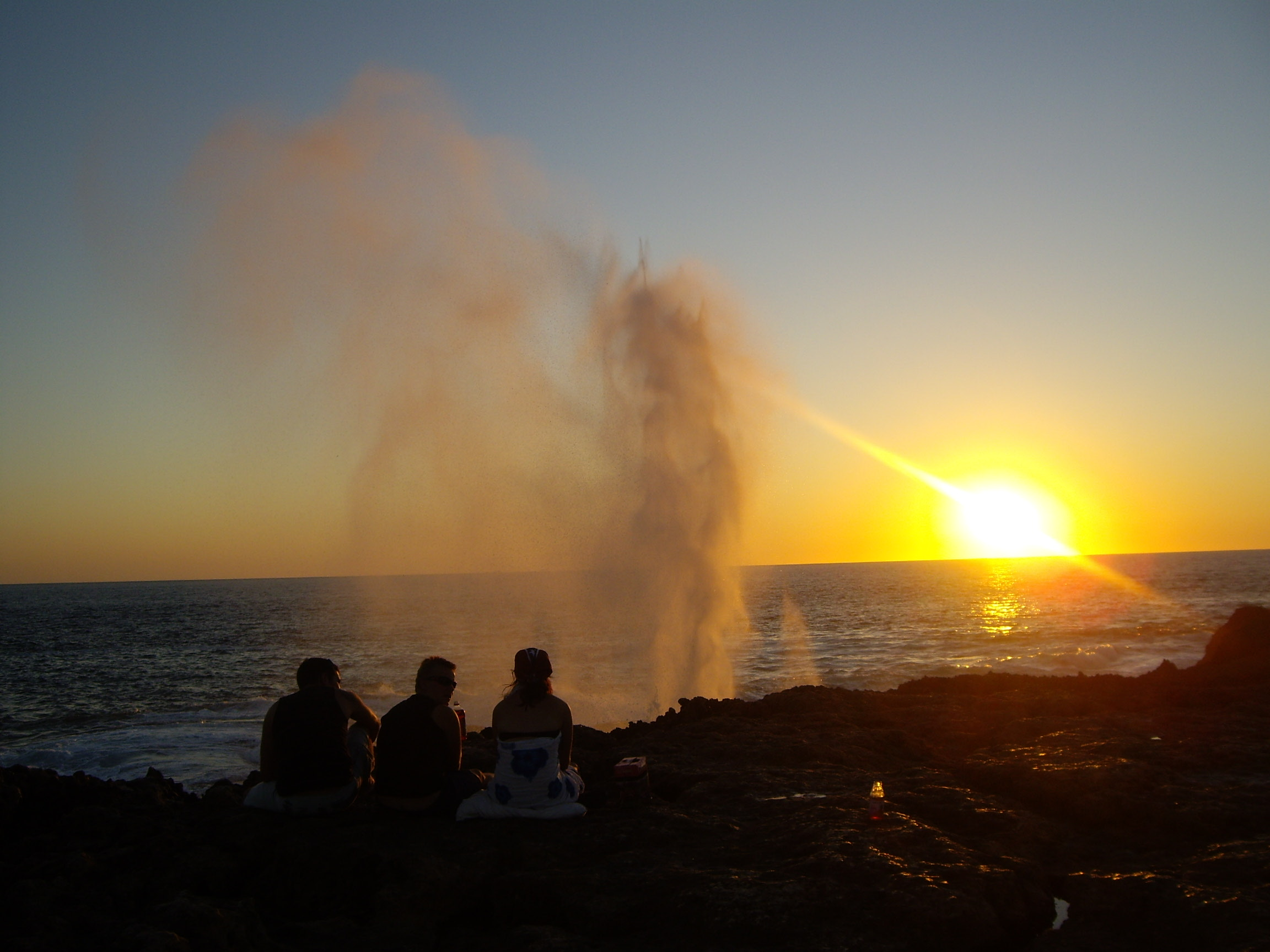
Blowholes at Quobba Point

Tourism and recreational activities, particularly fishing and surfing, have progressively increased since the 1970s. As of 2015, tourism accounted for 20% of the station's income. Attractions around the property include Ningaloo Reef, blowholes, the wreck of the bulk carrier Korean Star and a memorial cairn to HMAS Sydney. The station provides a variety of accommodation and a shop at Red Bluff.

=== Surfing ===
Red Bluff Point is a popular surfing spot with a left-hand break over the reef and waves of 0.3 to 3.7 metres (1 to 12 ft). In 2012, a surfer survived a shark attack there, and was rescued by other surfers.

== See also ==
- List of pastoral leases in Western Australia
