= Joseph Burnett =

Royal Australian Navy officer (1899–1941)

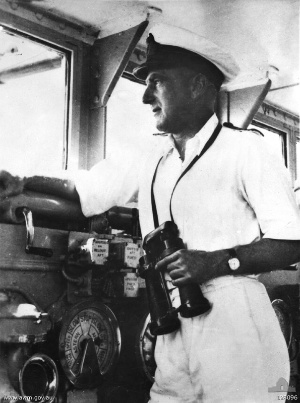
- Burnett on the bridge of HMAS Sydney
- Born: 26 December 1899; Singleton, New South Wales, Australia
- Died: 19 November 1941 (aged 41); Indian Ocean, off Dirk Hartog Island, Western Australia
- Cause of death: Killed in action
- Burial place: At sea
- Military career
- Allegiance: Australia
- Branch: Royal Australian Navy
- Service years: 1917–1941
- Rank: Captain
- Commands: HMAS Sydney
- Conflicts: First World War; Second World War; HMAS Sydney-HSK Kormoran action †

Joseph Burnett (26 December 1899 – 19 November 1941) was a Royal Australian Navy (RAN) officer most widely known as the captain of the light cruiser HMAS Sydney in the battle between HMAS Sydney and HSK Kormoran on 19 November 1941. He fought in both the First World War and Second World War, serving in the RAN and the Royal Navy (RN), and went down with the Sydney off the coast of Western Australia.

The loss of the Sydney was significant for two main reasons. First, it represented the loss of one third of all RAN officers and sailors who died during the Second World War in a single engagement—and not far from Australian soil, at that. Second, great mystery surrounded its loss. There had been no Australian survivors, and so it was not clear how or why a warship had been in a position to be sunk by a less well-armed merchant raider. As commander of the Sydney, Burnett bore primary responsibility for the ship and its crew, so he was an obvious target for criticism. Investigations into the ship's sinking have tried to examine his apparent decisions in the period leading up to the battle.

Regardless of the events of that day, Burnett was viewed as a good man and competent commander by his peers. His sons both pursued naval careers and served in the RAN. Following a successful search for the Sydney and Kormoran that located both wrecks in 2008, controversy surrounding Burnett's command arose again. His younger son, retired Commodore Rory Burnett, has defended him through various public statements.

== Early life ==
Burnett was born on 26 December 1899 in Singleton, New South Wales, Australia. He was the second son of Richard Burnett and Emily Burnett (née Adams), and the grandson of William Burnett, a blacksmith from Cornwall who had emigrated to New South Wales in 1859. He attended Singleton Primary School, where he demonstrated both academic and sporting ability.

Burnett's father died when he was seven years old, and it is possible that the boy was attracted to the newly formed Royal Australian Naval College (RANC) by the possibility of a free education, as well as adventure. On 31 December 1912, he entered the RANC in Geelong, becoming one of its first entrants as a cadet midshipman. He graduated as a midshipman from the RANC on 1 January 1917.

== First World War ==
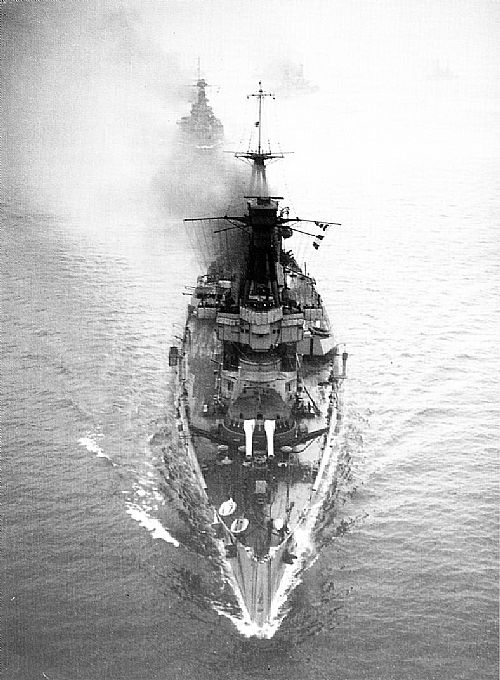
Burnett's first assignment was aboard the battlecruiser HMAS Australia

Burnett was sent to England, where he served aboard HMAS Australia, the flagship of 2nd Battle Cruiser Squadron. He remained with the ship for the remainder of the First World War, seeing service in the Atlantic Ocean, and reached the rank of sub-lieutenant in October 1918. At the conclusion of the war, HMAS Australia sailed for Australia, departing on 24 April 1919 and arriving on 28 May.

== Inter-war years ==
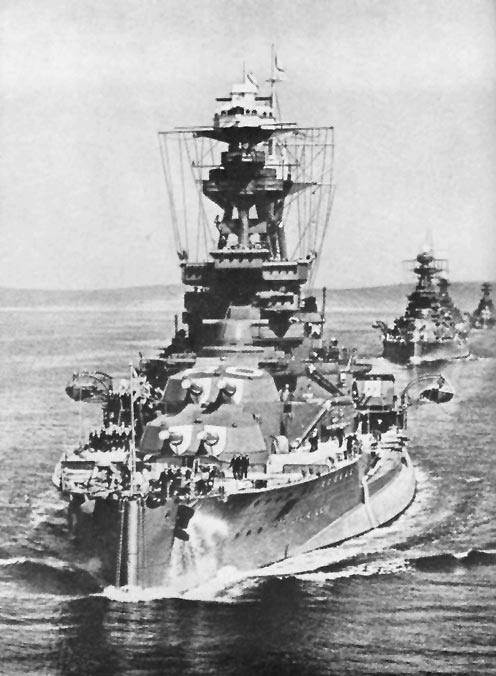
Burnett's second posting at sea was aboard the battleship HMS Royal Oak

Burnett left HMAS Australia before departure and remained in England on an attachment to the RN, with which he served for the next seven years. During this time, he played on the RN's rugby team, and was also known for his performance in athletics, cricket, and tennis. In January 1920, Burnett was promoted to lieutenant. By 1922, he had qualified as a Gunnery Officer. He served aboard HMS Royal Oak during those years.

In 1924, Burnett was appointed as the gunnery officer on board HMAS Adelaide, before marrying Enid Ward and returning briefly to Australia, although still attached to the RN. After three years in Australia, he returned to England and was promoted to lieutenant commander on 1 January 1928. That year, he joined HMAS Canberra, which he stayed with until 1932 when he attended Naval Staff College at Greenwich. He was promoted to commander in December 1932, and remained at the college until 1933. Burnett once more returned to Australia, where he worked for the Navy Office in Melbourne for two years.

The Burnetts had two sons and a daughter: Patrick (born 1928), Rory (born 1929), and Bridget (born 1936).

Burnett missed the sea, and in 1936, he was reunited with HMAS Canberra, this time as executive officer. In 1937, he returned to England for the last time, serving aboard HMS Royal Oak and HMS Resolution. Whilst in England, he completed the Imperial Defence College course, and was promoted to captain on 31 December 1938.

== Second World War ==
At the outbreak of the Second World War on 3 September 1939, Burnett was recalled to Australia where he was made assistant chief of naval staff at the Navy Office in Melbourne. By October 1940, he had been sent to Singapore as the senior RAN representative at an Allied conference considering the defence of the Asia-Pacific region. At the conference, he called for the establishment of the Naval Auxiliary Patrol, which proved successful at patrolling harbour entrances throughout the war.

On 14 May 1941, Burnett received his first direct command when he was posted to HMAS Sydney. The ship had already acquired a distinguished war record in the Battle of the Mediterranean. Sydney had just completed a refit and her primary duties at the time were escorting convoys. The previous commanding officer was then Captain John Collins.

=== Battle between HMAS Sydney and HSK Kormoran ===
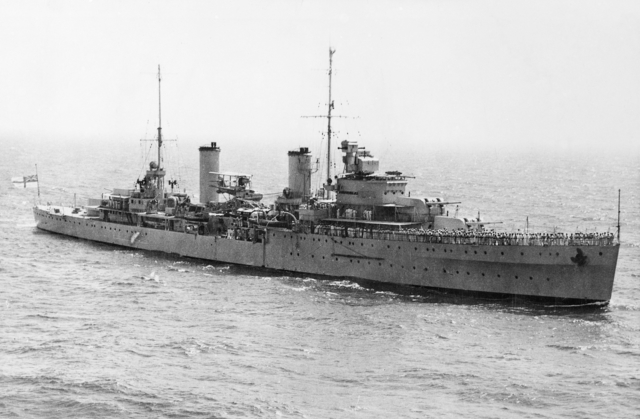
The light cruiser HMAS Sydney was Burnett's command from May 1941

In November 1941, HMAS Sydney undertook a mission to escort the troopship Zealandia to the Sunda Strait. The Sydney was returning to Fremantle when, at about 4:00 PM on 19 November at a point off the coast between Carnarvon and Geraldton, the crew sighted what appeared to be a merchant ship approximately 20 kilometres (11 nmi) away and challenged it. The other ship was the Kormoran, a merchant raider disguised as the Dutch freighter Straat Malakka.

According to accounts by Kormoran crew members, Sydney chased and overhauled the raider, while exchanging signals and attempting to verify her identity. The Sydney closed to within 1,000 yards and demanded a password from the Kormoran, at which point the raider opened fire on the Sydney. Survivors' accounts seemed to indicate that the Sydney was not ready for the engagement, and the Australian cruiser was hit several times before returning fire. At this point, the Sydney had caught fire.

The Sydney was better armoured and more heavily armed than the Kormoran, and struck her severely on the funnel and engine room, which caught fire immediately. With both ships critically damaged, the Sydney turned southwards. She disappeared from the view of the Kormoran and sank with all hands on board. The Kormoran was too badly damaged to be saved, and was scuttled by her captain.

=== Controversy ===
The loss of the Sydney was a significant event in Australia—of all the RAN officers and sailors who died during the Second World War, one third of them went down with the Sydney. Many found it difficult to believe that a converted merchant ship could sink a modern light cruiser, and also found it difficult to believe that a senior officer such as Burnett took his ship within 1,000 metres (1,100 yards) of an unidentified and possibly dangerous vessel during wartime without preparing for action, and with such disastrous results. It was also seen as strange that the bulk of the crew of the Kormoran survived, while there were no known survivors from the Sydney.

In 2008, following the discovery of the wrecks of HMAS Sydney and HSK Kormoran, controversy about Burnett's alleged actions arose again. In particular, one German survivor of the battle had reportedly accused Burnett of 'incompetent' and 'criminal' action—a claim refuted by Rory Burnett, who said: "I don't think he's in any position to make that judgment, but he's entitled to his opinion. My father was a very professional and highly regarded officer." He also said: "I'm not saying that closing was right. Indeed, with hindsight, it proved to be wrong. But closing on suspected ships had become a well-accepted tactic. It was not doctrine but it had been used successfully before by other experienced officers."

In August 2009, The Australian reported that the official inquiry led by Terence Cole "found [Burnett] behaved inexplicably, but not negligently, when he brought the warship too close to a German raider."

== Legacy ==
Collins, by then a vice admiral, wrote to Burnett's elder son, Patrick, saying: "Joe Burnett was one of our finest officers. An outstanding sport with a good brain—an unusual combination. With these qualifications and, as you so well know, a happy and cheerful disposition it is not surprising that he was one of the most popular of our year."

Burnett's sons, who were aged 13 and 12 when he died, both attended the RANC and went on to careers in the RAN. Younger son Rory received a special cadetship. Patrick reached the rank of commander and Rory reached the rank of commodore.

Burnett is commemorated by the Burnett Memorial Prize for rugby at the RANC.

== See also ==
- Fog of war
- Theodor Detmers

== Bibliography ==
- Burnett, P. R. (1973): Captain Joseph Burnett RAN Naval Historical Review (December 1973). Retrieved 9 January 2011.
