= Theodor Detmers =

German Navy officer (1902–1976)

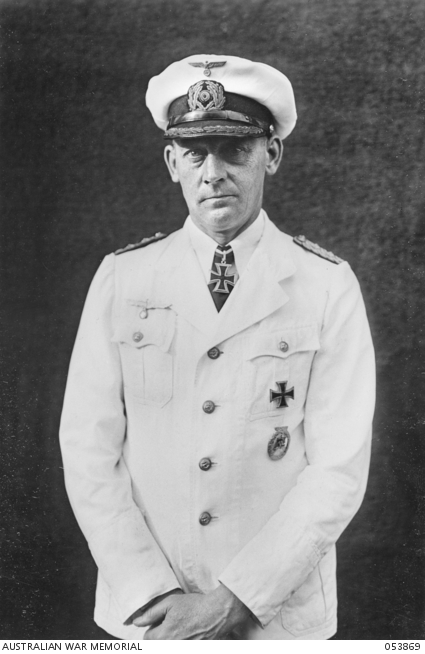
- Born: 22 August 1902; Witten, Prussia, German Empire
- Died: 4 November 1976 (aged 74); Rahlstedt, Hamburg, West Germany
- Military career
- Allegiance: Weimar Republic; Nazi Germany
- Branch: Reichsmarine; Kriegsmarine
- Service years: 1921–1945
- Rank: Kapitän zur See
- Unit: Kriegsmarine
- Commands: Hermann Schoemann Kormoran
- Conflicts: World War II; Operation Weserübung; Sydney–Kormoran Action (1941)
- Awards: Iron Cross; Knight's Cross of the Iron Cross
- Other work: Author

Theodor Detmers (22 August 1902 – 4 November 1976) was a German naval officer and captain of the German auxiliary cruiser Kormoran during World War II. He was a recipient of the Knight's Cross of the Iron Cross of Nazi Germany. Detmers commanded the commerce raider Kormoran when it sunk the Australian light cruiser HMAS Sydney in a mutually destructive battle.

== Career ==
Detmers joined the Reichsmarine in 1921 and served on the battleships Hannover and Elsass. He was educated on the sail training ship Niobe and also served on Berlin. Detmers became a sublieutenant on the cruiser Emden. From 1926 to 1928, he served on the Albatross. In 1927, he was promoted to lieutenant. From 1930 to 1932, he served as staff officer and was then stationed on the cruiser Köln, on which he visited Australia in 1933.

In 1934, he served on torpedo boats and destroyers of the Reichsmarine. In October 1938, he was in command of the destroyer Hermann Schoemann and participated in Operation Weserübung in April to June 1940.

=== HSK Kormoran ===
In July 1940, Detmers became captain of the commerce raider Kormoran, and captured or destroyed 11 enemy merchant ships. On 19 November 1941 Kormoran was intercepted by HMAS Sydney. Detmers tried to pose as a Dutch merchant ship. He allegedly lacked the necessary naval codes, however, and was finally forced to engage Sydney. Detmers sank the Australian cruiser in battle off Western Australia. His own ship was severely damaged and had to be scuttled, after which Detmers was captured and became a prisoner of war (POW).

In December 1941, Detmers was awarded the Knight's Cross of the Iron Cross and in 1943, was promoted to the rank of Kapitän zur See. He had earlier received the first class Iron Cross.

== Prisoner of war and later life ==
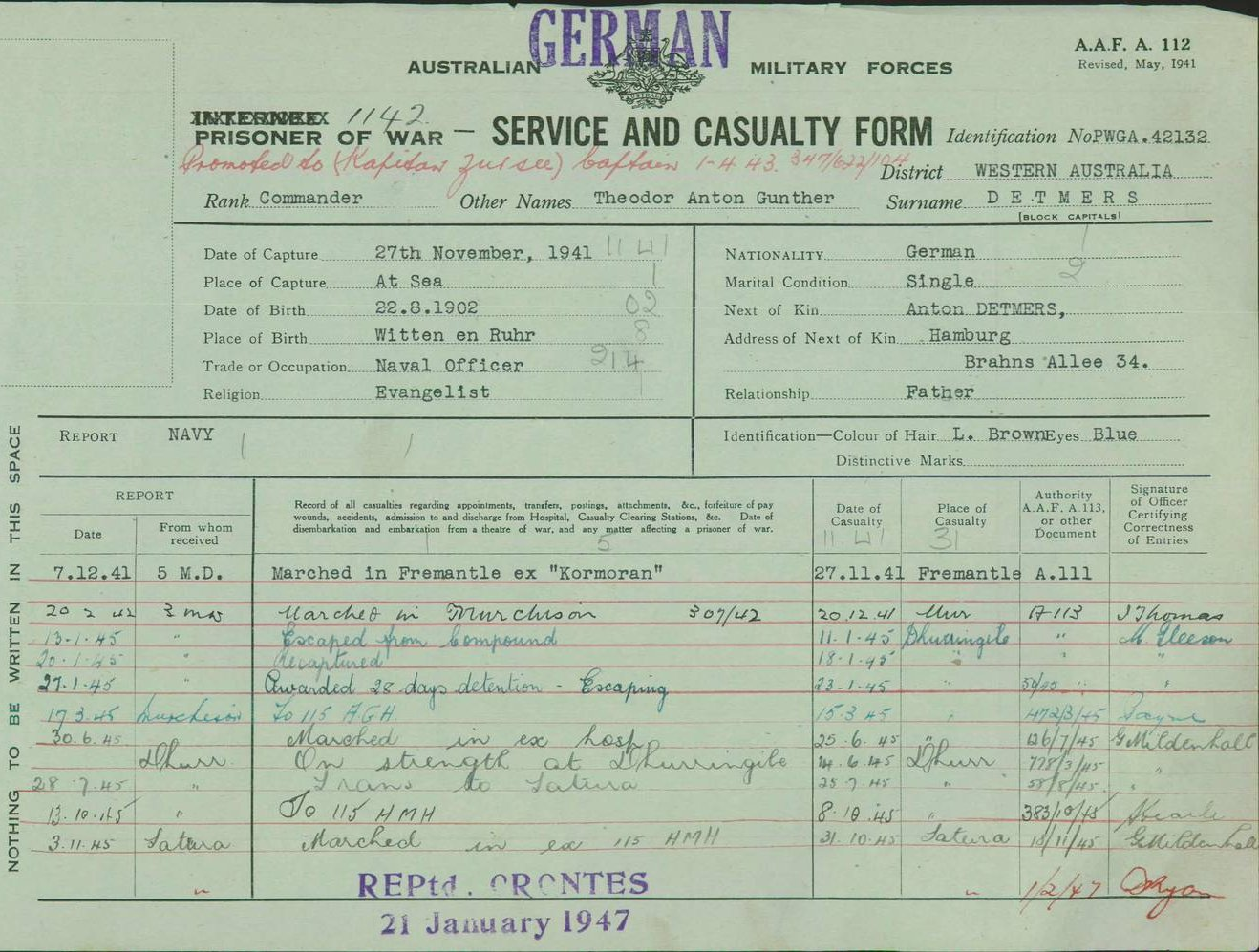
Detmers' Prisoner of War Service and Casualty Form

From 1941 to January 1947, Detmers was held as a POW at HM Prison Dhurringile. While a prisoner, he wrote a coded account of the battle between HMAS Sydney and German auxiliary cruiser Kormoran that survived the war. Detmers tried to escape Australian captivity with other members of his crew, through a tunnel and then hoped to capture a sailboat to get to Indonesia; however, the attempt was unsuccessful. Later during his imprisonment, he suffered a stroke.

Detmers returned to Germany in 1947 and was released from British captivity in Munster. Due to his stroke, he was ineligible for service in the post-war German navy. In the early 1950s he married Ursula Reinhardt, daughter of a Protestant pastor. They had no children and he died in Rahlstedt, Hamburg in 1976. Detmers wrote a book about his Kormoran experiences, which was translated into English.

== Awards and decorations ==
- Knight's Cross of the Iron Cross on 4 December 1941 as Fregattenkapitän and commander of auxiliary cruiser Kormoran (HSK-8)

== Selected works ==
- Detmers, Theodor Anton Gunther (1959). The Raider Kormoran. Translated by Fitzgerald, Edward (1st ed.). London: William Kimber. ASIN B0007JJ5XC. OL 22451411M. Wikidata Q131399698.

== See also ==
- Joseph Burnett
