= HMAS Heros =

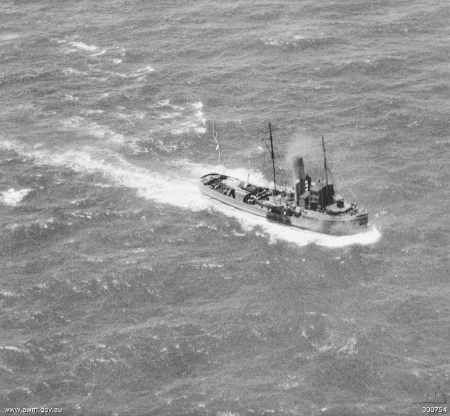
- HMAS Heros in 1943

History
- Owner: Royal Navy (1919–1925); J. Fenwick and Co. (1925–1964, except for RAN service); Royal Australian Navy (1940–1942 and 1943–1947)
- Builder: Murdoch and Murray Ltd, Port Glasgow
- Launched: 28 February 1919
- Completed: May 1919
- Commissioned: RN: May 1919 – September 1925; RAN: 3 July 1941 – 13 August 1942 and 25 February 1943 – 12 February 1947
- Reclassified: St Erth (1919–1925); Heros (1925–1964)
- Fate: Scrapped in December 1966

General characteristics
- Class & type: Rescue/Saint class ocean tug
- Type: Tugboat
- Tonnage: 382 gross register tons
- Length: 135.4 ft (41.3 m)
- Beam: 29 ft (8.8 m)
- Draught: 13.6 ft (4.1 m)
- Propulsion: 1,200 hp (890 kW)
- Speed: 12 knots (22 km/h)
- Complement: 32 (RAN service)
- Armament: One twelve pounder gun, two 0.303 Vickers machine guns, two depth charge racks, two PAC rocket projectors (RAN service)
- Notes: Ship's characteristics from Corvettes. Australia's Naval Patrol Forces. Photofile No. 10, p. 70

HMAS Heros (W130, FY87) was a tugboat which was operated by the Royal Navy (RN), Royal Australian Navy (RAN) and the Australian shipping firm J. Fenwick and Co. She was built for the RN in 1919, was sold to J. Fenwick and Co. in 1925 and was commissioned into the RAN between 1941 and 1942 and 1943 and 1947 before being scrapped in 1966.

== Operational history ==
The ship was built for the RN as the Rescue/Saint class ocean tug St Erth. She entered service in 1919 and was sold to J. Fenwick and Co. in September 1925 and renamed Heros. She was hired by the RAN for short periods in 1934 and 1937 to tow targets during naval exercises.

Following the outbreak of World War II, Heros was requisitioned by the RAN on 2 November 1939. She was later converted to an auxiliary anti-submarine vessel and commissioned on 3 July 1941. During her naval service she was fitted with weapons and a raised forecastle. In late November and early December 1941 she took part in the search for survivors from HMAS Sydney and found one of the ship's carley floats: one of only two items found from the cruiser, and currently on display at the Australian War Memorial in Canberra. She was returned to her owners on 13 August 1942.

Heros was taken over by the RAN for brief periods during the remainder of 1942 and early 1943 before being recommissioned at Brisbane on 25 February 1943. During her second commission she was used as a tugboat, and served mainly in northern Australia and New Guinea. She was paid off from the RAN on 12 February 1947 and returned to her owners on 5 November that year. She continued in commercial service until she was sold for scrap on 9 December 1964 and was beached to be broken up on 7 December 1966.
