= German concession of Tianjin =

German territory in central Tianjin, China

German concession of Tianjin 天津德租界
- 1895–1917
- Flag

- The German concession in green Other concessions in light green
- Status: Concession of the German Empire
- History
  - Tianjin Treaty Port Concession Agreement: 1895
  - Repossession into the Republic of China: 1917
Preceded by	Succeeded by
Qing Dynasty	Republic of China

The German concession of Tianjin (Chinese: 天津德租界) was a territory (concession) in central Tianjin existing from 1895 to 1917.

== History ==
=== Establishment ===
On May 21, 1895, the German diplomat to China Alfred Pelldram submitted a demand to the Qing Dynasty that as Germany had "forced Japan to return the Liaodong peninsula" during the First Sino-Japanese War, Germany was to be given the same special treatment as Britain, France, etc. Thus, on October 30, the Qing government delimited a swath of land of 1034 mu (about 380 acres) below the British concession of Tianjin.

==== Conflict with the American "concession" ====
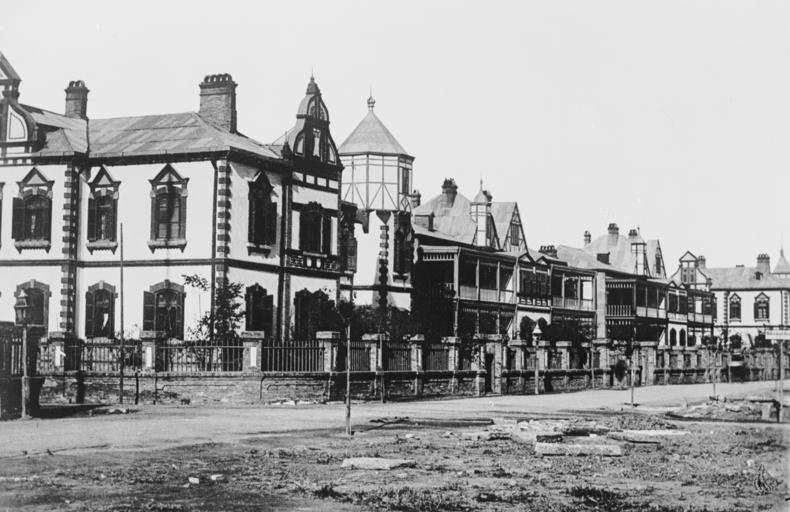
Former Wilhelm Street

Pelldram's drafted plans for the German concession included a small section under the British concession, present-day Xiaobailou Subdistrict. The US consul in Tianjin at the time, Charles Denby Jr., protested, claiming that the district was under American jurisdiction, granted to the US for its role as mediator during the Convention of Peking in 1860. A few days after Denby submitted this letter to the US State Department, the Germans began constructing two roads connecting it to the British concession, which would pass through the American concession. Ultimately, with Denby re-establishing a US presence through a newly formed patrol, the Germans staved off of the land.

=== Expansion ===
As a pretense to the Boxer Rebellion, a German ambassador was killed on the 20th of June, 1900, inflaming the Germans both abroad and back home, leading to a German army landing in China from Bremen. The subsequent intervention by the Eight Nations in the Boxer Rebellion was used as a precursor by Germany to force the Qing Dynasty to more than double the concession's size.

=== Withdrawal ===
After the outbreak of World War One, in 1917, the Chinese government announced the occupation of the German concession, changing it to Tianjin Special Administrative Region No. 1 (Special No. 1 District). Germany agreed to undertake the terms stipulated under the Concessions in China clause in the Treaty of Versailles; save for Qingdao and other Japan-occupied territories in China, the Chinese government formally absorbed the German concession.

== Life in the concession ==
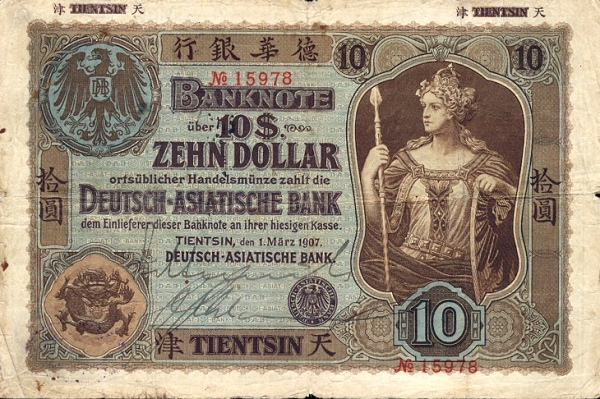
Ten-dollar note of the Deutsch-Asiatische Bank

While extant sources are rather scarce, foreign nationals in Tianjin fondly recalled the concession, with British journalist H.G.W. Woodhead claiming in 1934 that it had the finest residential facilities for foreigners. Notable locations in the German concession included:

- The German consulate, located at the northeast corner of the intersection of former Wilhelm Street and Monument Street;
- The former German barracks, which garrisoned 1,400 troops (reduced to 1,200 in 1902);
- Tianjin German club, designed by German architects Curt Rothkegel and Ruth Kegan, which became occupied by the American Red Cross after Germany's defeat in World War Two;
- Kiessling Restaurant, opened by Albert Kiessling that served Western style baked goods and dishes;
- The old residences of Zhang Xun and Liu Guanxiong;

and more. The Deutsch-Asiatische Bank was in charge of handling the concession's land-based matters and, for their "careful preparation [of the concession]", was well managed, according to former Italian consul of Tianjin Cesare Poma. Although most German firms ended up migrating to the commercially prosperous British concession, industries such as real estate, entertainment boomed; the concession also had some of the earliest electrical services in North China up until then.

== Gallery ==
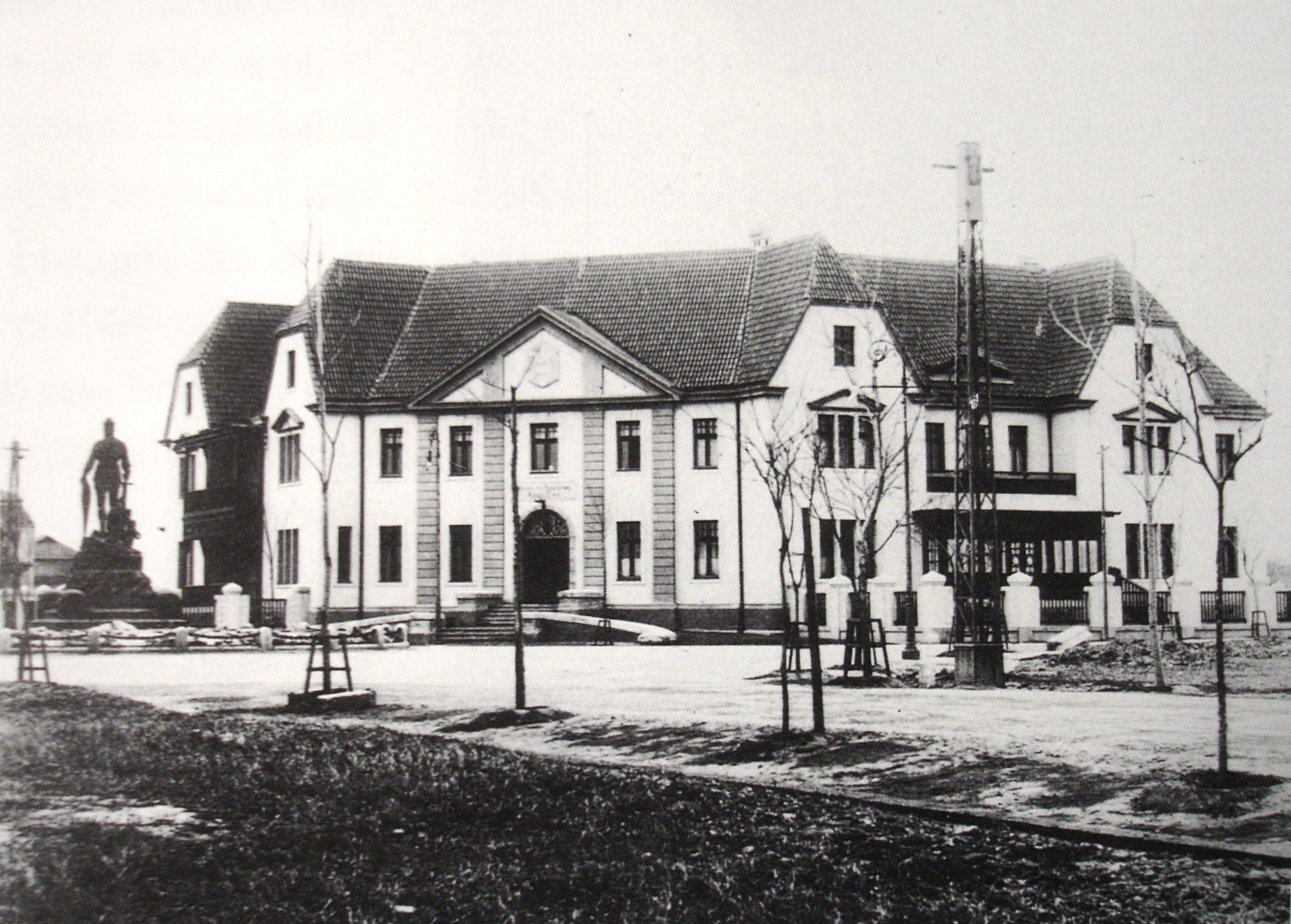
German consulate of Tianjin

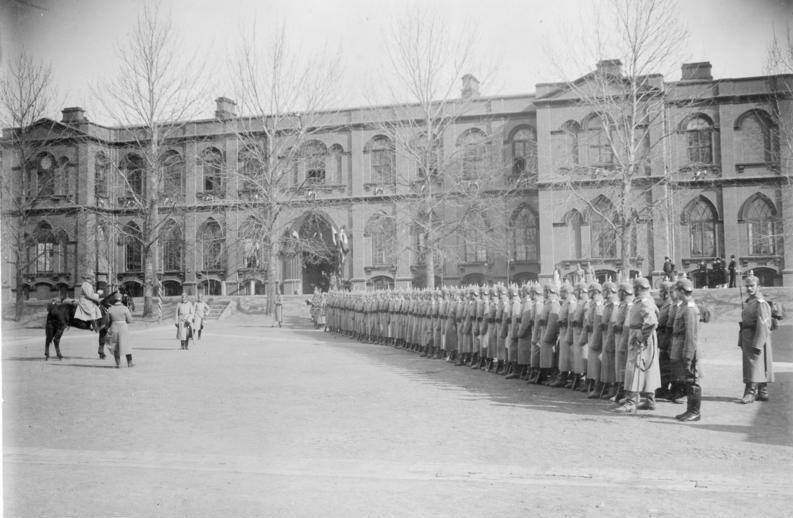
German barracks in Tianjin, now the site of Haihe Middle School

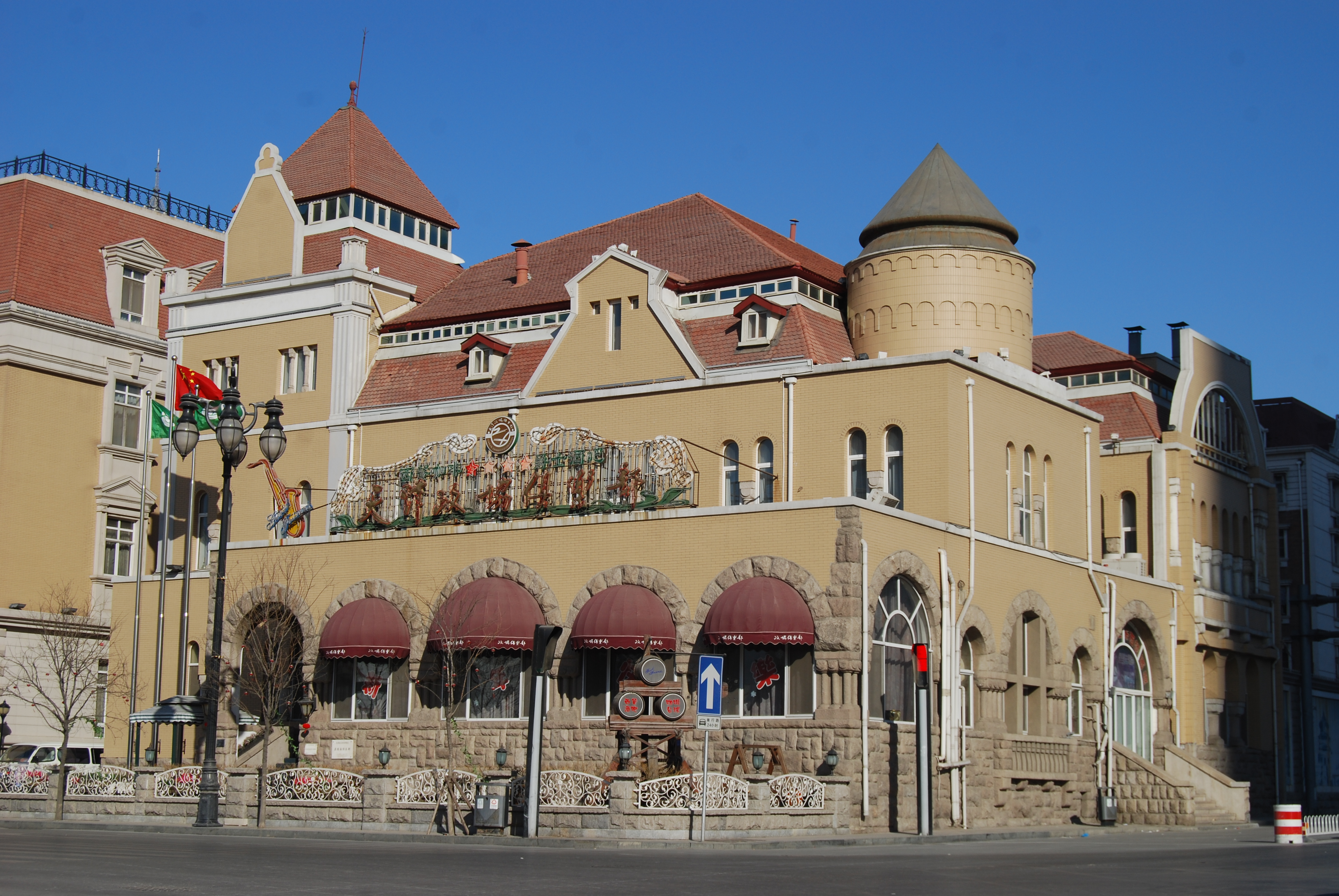
The German Club in Tianjin

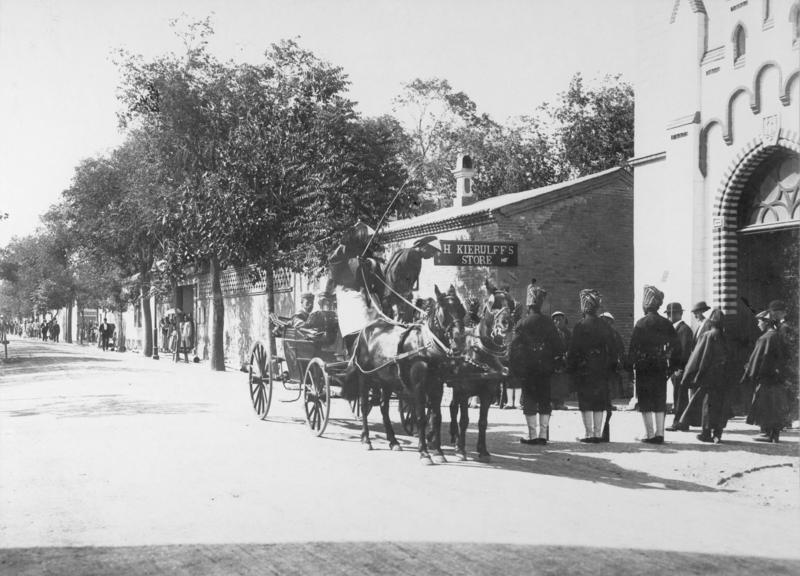
Prince Heinrich visiting the German Club in Tianjin during a tour in 1898

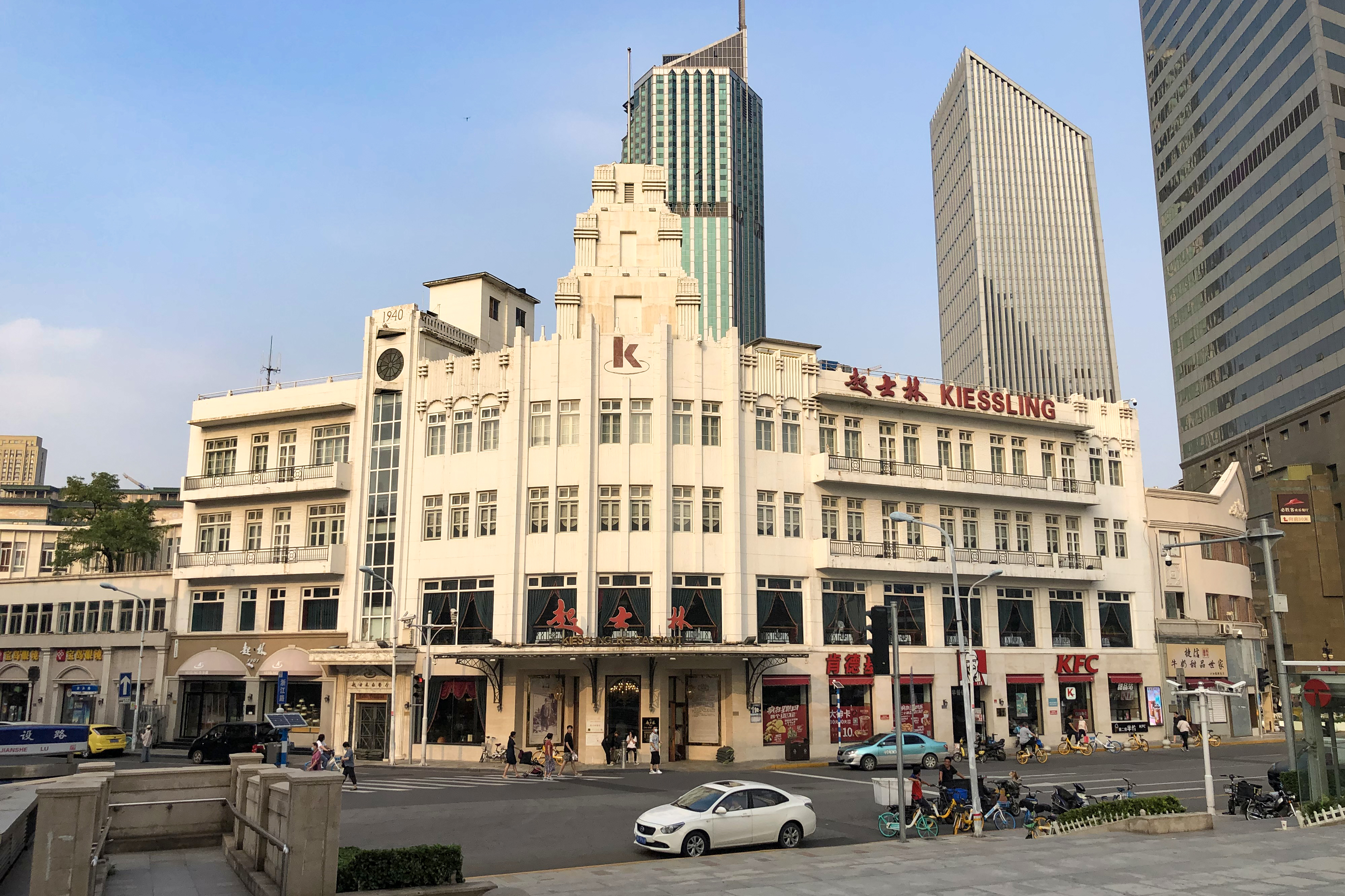
Kiessling Restaurant

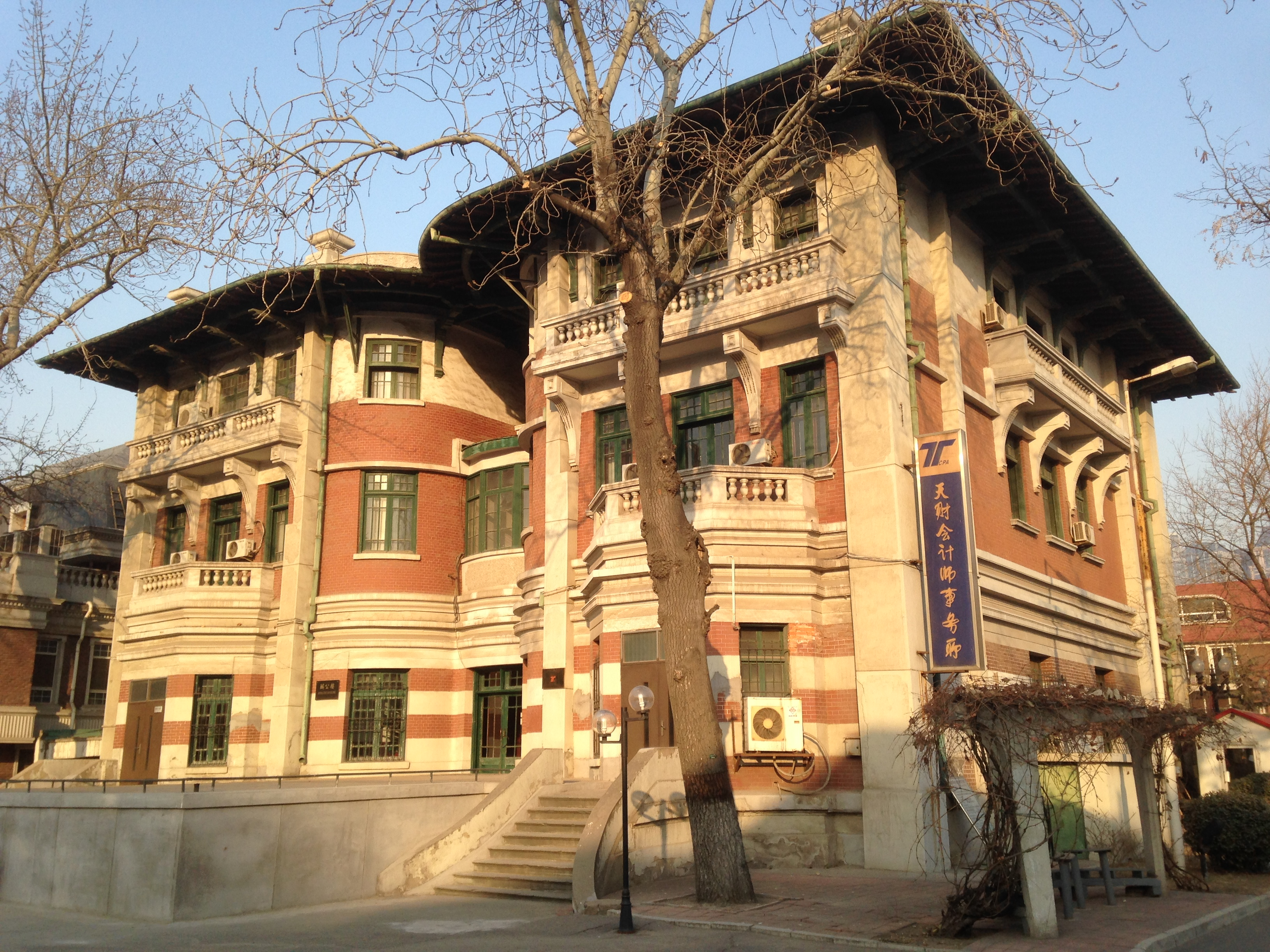
The European-esque residence of Liu Guanxiong, admiral of the Republic of China

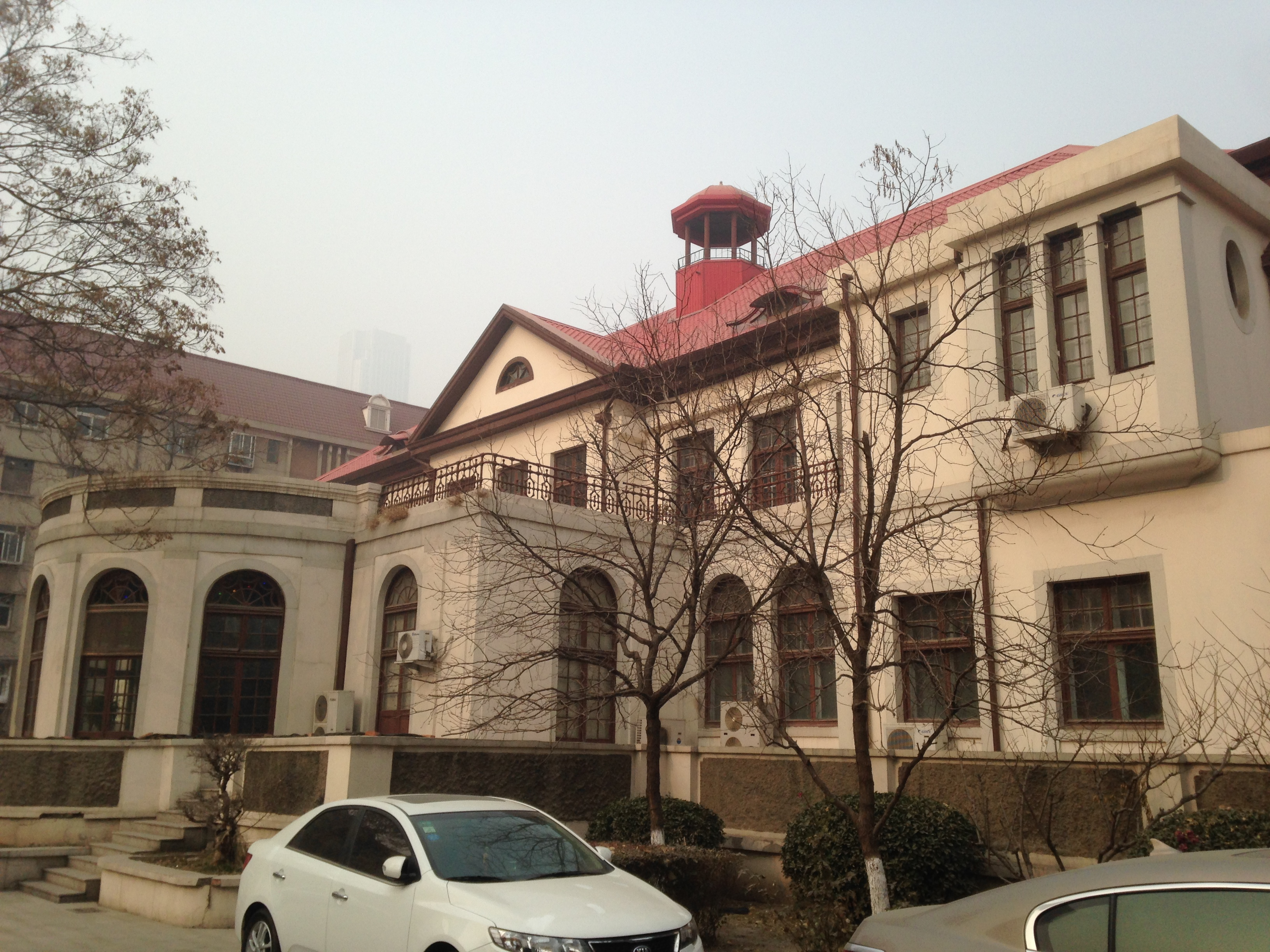
Residence of warlord Zhang Xun

== List of Consuls ==
- Alfred Pelldram (1881–1885)
- Albert Evan Edwin Reinhold Freiherr von Seckendorff (1889–1896)
- Dr. Rudolf Eiswaldt (1896–1900)
- Arthur Zimmermann (1900–1902)
- Paul Max von Eckardt (1902–1905)
- Hubert von Knipping (1906–1913)
- Fritz Wendschuch (1913–1917)

== See also ==
- Concessions in Tianjin
- Concessions of China
- Map of concessions in Tianjin (in Chinese)
- Belgian colonial empire
- List of former foreign enclaves in China
