= Christoph Müller =

Christoph Müller may refer to:

- Christoph Müller (ski jumper) (born 1968), Austrian ski jumper
- Christoph Mueller (born 1961), former chief executive officer of Malaysia Airlines
- Christoph H. Müller (born 1967), musician and composer born in Germany and raised in Switzerland
- Christoph Müller (diplomat) (born 1950), German diplomat
- Christoph Müller (producer) (born 1964), the producer of Sophie Scholl – The Final Days and Young Goethe in Love
- Christoph Gottlob Müller (1785–1858), founder of the Wesleyan Church in Germany
