= Walther Hess =

German diplomat (1900–1986)

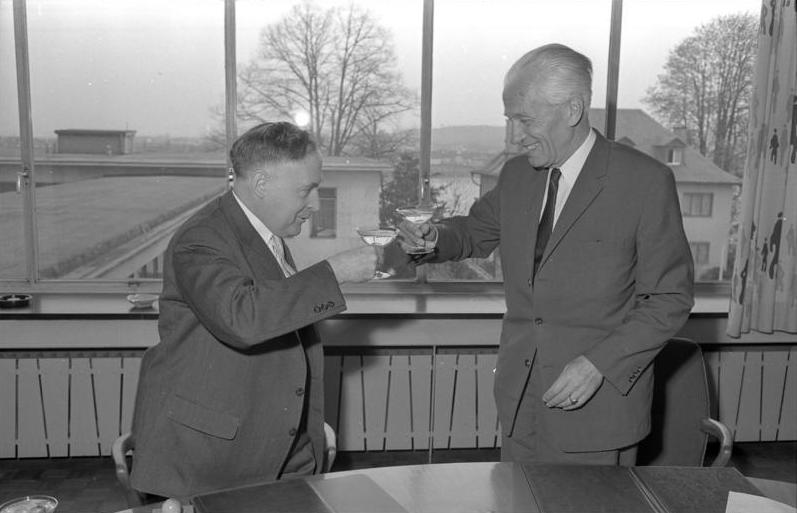
- Hess (right) in 1961 with Irish Ambassador to Germany William Warnock celebrating the conclusion of a trade deal.
- Born: 12 March 1900; Frankfurt am Main, Hesse-Nassau, Prussia
- Died: 26 August 1986 (aged 86); St Ives, New South Wales, Australia
- Education: University of Giessen; University of Tübingen; Ludwig-Maximilians-Universität München; University of Göttingen
- Occupations: Public servant and diplomat
- Spouse: Hedi Jutti

Walther Hess (12 March 1900 – 26 August 1986) was a German diplomat who served as the first Ambassador to Australia.

== Early life and education ==
Walther Hess was born in Frankfurt am Main, Hesse-Nassau, Prussia, on 12 March 1900. After graduating from school, Hess studied law and political science at the University of Giessen, the University of Tübingen, the Ludwig-Maximilians-Universität München, and the University of Göttingen. In 1923, Hess was granted his doctor of law with a thesis entitled "Family Maintenance at convocation".

== Diplomatic career ==
In 1925, he joined the German Foreign Office as an Attaché and graduated from the state examinations for the consular and diplomatic service. In 1927, he was appointed vice-consul in Toruń, Poland, and in 1928 was Secretary of Legation in Kovno. From 1929 to 1932 he was vice-consul in Jerusalem in the British mandated territory of Palestine, and from 1932 to 1938 he was Secretary of the Legation in Belgrade, Romania. In 1938, he was transferred into inactive service for "political reasons", although the real reason was due to his wife being Jewish, and took early retirement in 1944. From 1938 to 1945, Hess moved abroad into the private sector and was the representative of the Reemtsma tobacco company in Occupied Greece and neutral Turkey.

In early 1950, the reconstituted Foreign Office of the Federal Republic of Germany reactivated his commission as a diplomat and on 30 January 1952, Hess was sent to Australia to become the first German Ambassador to Australia. Upon departing at Victoria Dock in Melbourne, Hess was greeted by a group holding placards calling him a Nazi, a charge echoed by Jewish representative groups in Australia, an allegation he vehemently denied: "I know that the German people under Hitler did great harm to the Jewish people. Many of them must always feel bitterness, but I, too, suffered under Hitler. My wife's people were killed by him, and I had to leave my country." Presenting his credentials to Governor-General Sir William McKell on 9 July 1952, Hess took the role of repairing Germany's relations with Australia: "May this event mark a break with a deplorable past which has inflicted so much suffering also upon the people of Australia. It is the sincere desire of my Government to participate most actively in the universal struggle against the distress which the last war left in its wake." Assisted by a small staff of nine, Hess initially based the embassy in various hotels in Sydney. However, in 1955, with the construction of new embassy premises, Hess moved the embassy to Canberra. In January 1953, Hess visited South Australia to inspect the growing German community there. In the last years of his service in Australia, Hess served as Dean of the Diplomatic Corps.

From 1959 to 1960, Hess was appointed as ambassador in Mexico City, and, from 1960 to 1962, he returned to Germany as Deputy Director-General of the Foreign Office, with special responsibility for international trade policy, in Bonn. On 10 September 1962, Hess was given his final posting as Ambassador to Morocco, serving until 31 May 1965. In retirement Hess returned to Australia, living in St Ives, New South Wales with his wife, until his death in 1986.

Diplomatic posts
New title	Ambassador of Germany to Australia; 1952–1958	Succeeded by Hans Mühlenfeld
Preceded by Gebhardt von Walther	Ambassador of Germany to Mexico; 1959–1960	Succeeded by Richard Hertz
Preceded by Herbert Müller-Roschach	Ambassador of Germany to Morocco; 1962–1965	Succeeded by Heinz Voigt
