= Carl Ludwig Sahl =

German businessman and diplomat

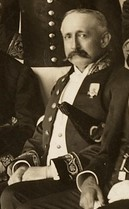
- Sahl at Government House, Sydney, 23 November 1895.

German Consul in Sydney
- In office 9 July 1872 – 1 April 1897
- Preceded by: Siegfried Frank
- Succeeded by: Post abolished

Personal details
- Born: 8 January 1840 Darmstadt, Grand Duchy of Hesse and by Rhine
- Died: 1 April 1897 (aged 57) Darling Point, Colony of New South Wales

Carl Ludwig Sahl (8 January 1840 – 1 April 1897) was a German businessman and diplomat who lived in the British Colony of New South Wales for 25 years until his death, and served as the German Consul in Sydney as well as the Special Commercial Agent of the Kingdom of Fiji in Sydney.

== Early life and career ==
Born in Darmstadt in the Grand Duchy of Hesse and by Rhine in 1840, Sahl was educated in Germany, and left Germany in 1858 for Birmingham, from which he soon departed for Australia. Sahl took up residence in Geelong in the Colony of Victoria, where he remained until 1862. In 1862, Sahl moved north to the Colony of Queensland, being involved in the cotton industry and squatting. Sahl left Queensland in 1870 for Sydney in the Colony of New South Wales and joined the mercantile firm of Rabone, Feez and Company, rising from a general clerk to be a senior partner.

== Life in New South Wales ==
In 1872, as a recognition of the prominent position he held within the German community in the colony, he was appointed the consul for the German Empire in Sydney, from 1879 acting underneath the German Consuls-General for Australia, Richard Krauel, Gustav Travers and Alfred Pelldram. On occasions he also acted as Consul or Consular agent for Switzerland, Italy, and Austria-Hungary.

As a senior member and later managing director of Rabone, Feez and Company, Sahl was closely involved in Adolph Feez's investments into the Kingdom of Fiji, acting as a Special Commercial Agent for Fiji in Sydney. With the British takeover of Fiji in 1874, Sahl was closely involved in disputes with the British government over the validity of foreign land claims in the colony. On their takeover, the British authorities led by Governor Sir Arthur Hamilton-Gordon passed the Pacific Islanders' Protection Act, 1875, which required all foreign land claimants to provide sufficient evidence of their transfer of land from the Fijians. They set up a Land Commission to investigate these claims and of 1327 claims made, it disallowed 361 cases, of which 140 came from German subjects. As a consequence, Sahl led a movement from these German subjects, including himself, who demanded compensation for the confiscated property. As a result of Sahl's complaints, Chancellor Otto von Bismarck responded with diplomatic efforts to resolve the dispute. These efforts led to the establishment in 1885 of an Anglo-German Mixed Commission, which issued compensation to various disallowed claims, including Sahl's, who received £9000.

== Later life ==
For his services as German Consul, Sahl was awarded by Kaiser Wilhelm II with the Third Class of the Prussian Order of the Crown and a Knight, Fourth Class, of the Order of the Red Eagle. As one of the oldest members of the German Club in Phillip Street, Sydney, Sahl served as president of the club for many years including in 1896. In the 1890s, Sahl purchased a mansion as his residence in Sydney, "Longwood", in Darling Point, from the family of former Sydney Mayor George Thornton. At Longwood, Sahl maintained a distinguished social calendar, receiving many notables, including pianist Anton de Kontski, French consul-general Georges Biard d'Aunet, Governor of Fiji Sir John Bates Thurston and Major General Edward Hutton.

In early 1896 Sahl sustained a stroke, and went to Fiji, on one of his plantations there, to regain his health. Returning to Sydney in August 1896, Sahl suffered another stroke soon after. In significantly bad health, in early 1897 Sahl suffered from "an attack of inflammation of the lungs", which led to his death at his Sydney residence on 1 April. His death was greatly mourned, with a large funeral cortege transporting his body for burial at Waverley Cemetery being escorted by contingents from the German naval ships present in Sydney Harbour, SMS Falke and SMS Bussard, and a small contingent from the Austro-Hungarian Gunboat also present in Sydney, SMS Albatross.

== Honours ==
- Knight, Fourth Class, of the Order of the Red Eagle (Kingdom of Prussia).
- Order of the Crown, 3rd Class (Kingdom of Prussia).

Diplomatic posts
Preceded by Siegfried Frank	German Consul in Sydney; 1872–1897	Post abolished
