= Richard Kiliani =

German diplomat and author

- Born: 29 June 1861; Munich, Kingdom of Bavaria
- Died: 7 November 1927; Schondorf am Ammersee, Bavaria, Germany
- Occupation: Diplomat
- Spouse: Klara Kiliani

Richard Paul Kiliani (29 June 1861 – 7 November 1927) was a German diplomat and author, who served as the Consul-General of Germany for Australia from 1911 to 1914.

== Early life and education ==
Born in Munich in the Kingdom of Bavaria in 1861, Kiliani studied in Munich and entered the Imperial Foreign Office in 1887.

== Diplomatic career ==
In 1888 he was assigned to the Prussian embassy in Hamburg, and thereafter served as Consul in Kovno, Kovno Governorate, Russian Empire (1889–1892), Basel, Switzerland (1893–1895) and Bucharest, Romania (1895–1905). On 28 March 1905 he was appointed to succeed the deceased Hans Hermann Eschke as Consul-General of Germany at Singapore, with responsibility for the Straits Settlements and Cocos Keeling and Christmas Islands, Johore, the Federated Malay States, the Colony of Labuan, British North Borneo, Brunei and the Kingdom of Sarawak.

On 25 May 1911, Kiliani was appointed to succeed Dr Georg Irmer as German Consul-General for Australia in Sydney, with responsibility for "the Commonwealth of Australia, Papua, New Zealand, the Fiji Islands, and the British Islands in the Southern Seas, situated between Tonga and the French Possessions." Kiliani arrived in Sydney in November 1911 on board the Norddeutscher Lloyd steamer Prinz Waldemar. With the British Empire's declaration of war against Germany on 4 August 1914, Kiliani was promptly recalled and left Sydney with his wife, together with the Austro-Hungarian Consul-General, Dr Ferdinand Freyersleben, and his chancellor, Karl Clette, on board the American Oceanic Steamship Company SS Ventura on 29 August 1914.

In November 1914 he was transferred to non-active status, but continued to be employed as head of the press office in the Foreign Office. In 1920-21 he served as Consul General in Amsterdam, and from 1921 until 1924, he headed the passport office in Salzburg before his retirement.

Diplomatic posts
Preceded by Hans Hermann Eschke	German Consul-General at Singapore; 1905 – 1911	Succeeded by Karl-Christian Feindel
Preceded by Georg Irmer	Consul-General of Germany for Australia; 1911 – 1914	Vacant Title next held by Hans Büsing
