= American concession of Tianjin =

Former American settlement in China

American concession of Tientsin 天津美租界
- 1860–1901
- Flag of the United States at the time of the concession's establishment

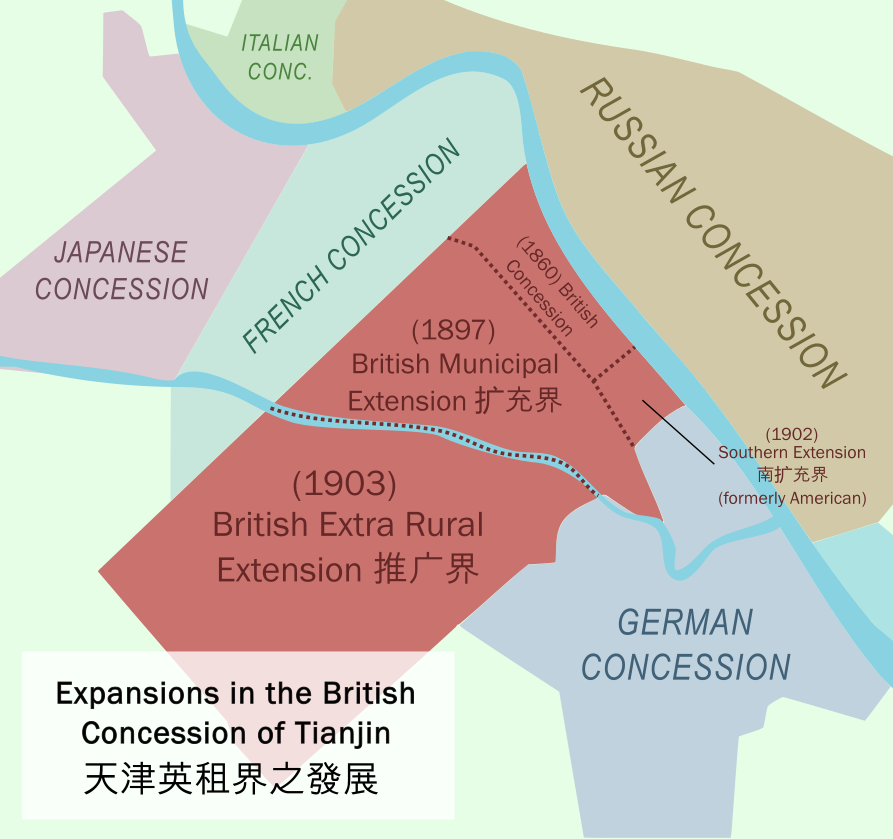
- Map of the British concession's expansion. The former territory of the American concession is denoted as the "Southern Extension".
- Status: Concession of United States
- History
  - Established: 1860
  - Absorption into the British concession of Tianjin: 1901
Preceded by	Succeeded by
Qing dynasty	Qing dynasty
- Today part of: People's Republic of China

The American concession of Tianjin (Chinese: 天津美租界; pinyin: Tiānjīn měi zūjiè) was a territory (concession) in the Chinese city of Tientsin de facto occupied by the United States between the 1860s and 1901 in present-day Xiaobailou Subdistrict. American administration of the settlement existed in a legal gray area where no material paperwork ever existed to demarcate the concession. Its existence was only made possible by acknowledgment by all sides: the United States, the Qing dynasty, and other local concession municipal governments, including the German, Russian, and British concessions.

== Legal status ==
There are no records of the establishment, demarcation, or even purchase of the American concession in Tianjin in 1860. This is supported by an 1896 statement from U.S. Secretary of State Richard Olney to Charles Denby Jr., the U.S. ambassador to Peking: "There is no record the United States has accepted the concession (in Tianjin)".

The lack of documentation led to multiple civil and diplomatic crises. Congress itself fluctuated between its recognition of the territory: multiple times, the Americans had renounced the management of the settlement, but due to its extraterritorial status, the Qing government refused to reclaim it for fear of instigating a casus belli. Thus it appears that there was a tacit agreement between the Qing and United States over the existence of this extraterritorial jurisdiction.

== History ==
=== Establishment ===
The establishment of the concession is vague and seemed to fall in the hands of Chinese daotais and yamens more than American diplomats. According to Denby, "a tract of land" was given to the U.S. by the Qing diplomat Chonghou to compensate for the American role as an intermediary in the Convention of Peking in 1860, along with the British and French concessions. However, given that America was approaching a state of civil war at the time, Chinese affairs were naturally secondary, and no documents in the American legation in Beijing (then Peking) nor the consulate in Tianjin contain documents formalizing the settlement.

American ambassadorial presence began in earnest in 1862 with the establishment of the American legation in Beijing, and a consul was established in Tianjin in 1866. With the American government preoccupied mainly with economic matters in Japan and the American Philippines, governance of the settlement relied largely on the actions of individual consuls in Tianjin. In 1877, consul George Bromley organized a settlement patrol with the support of existing American merchants and shopkeepers. However, he would later disband the patrols for "lack of jurisdiction" and attempted to hand the concession back to the Chinese government. This sentiment was later echoed in 1895 by the new consul, Sheridan Read. Zheng Zaoru, the Chinese ambassador, rebuffed these attempts.

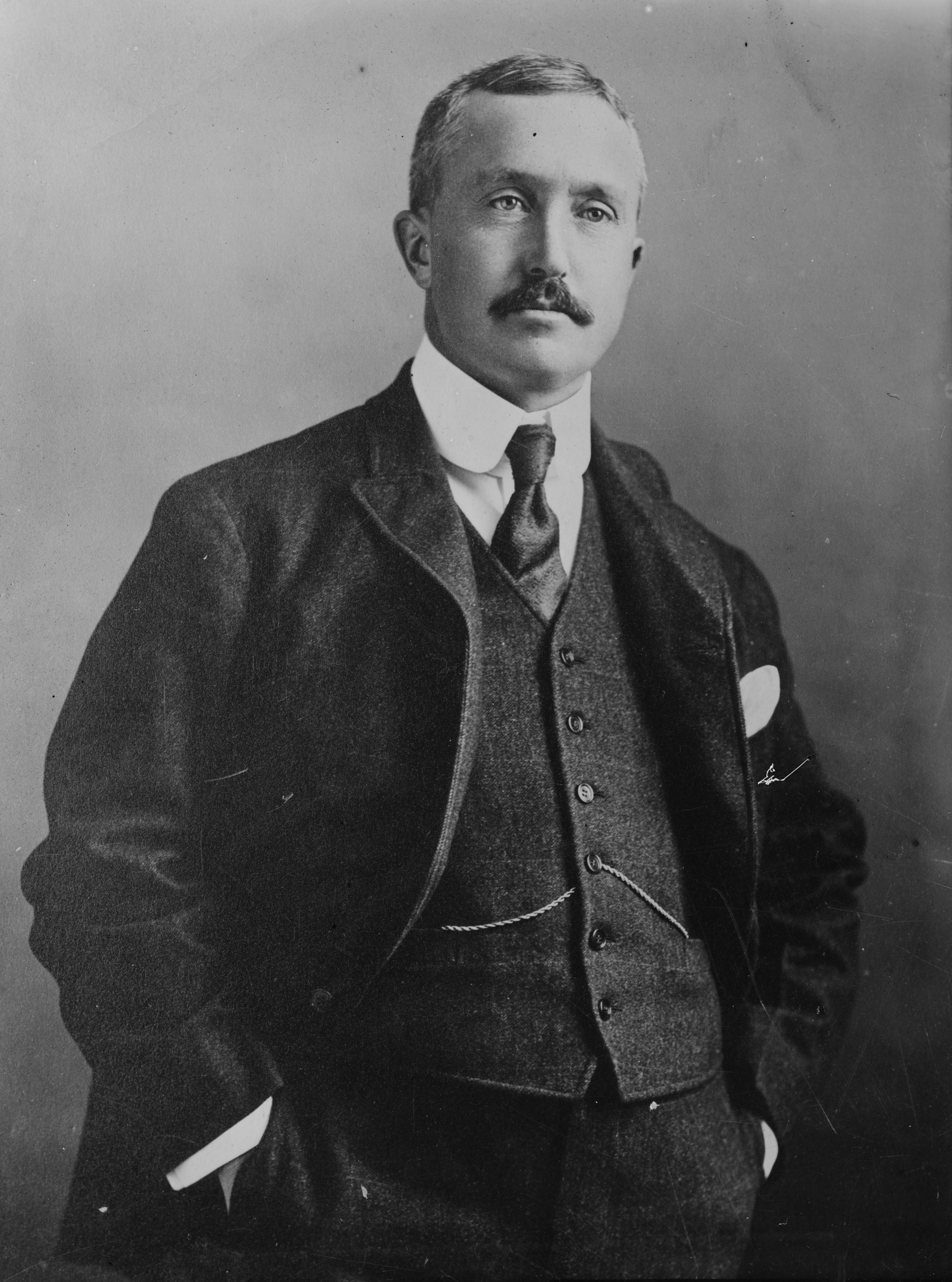
American diplomat Charles Denby Jr.

The first diplomatic crisis occurred after Read attempted to surrender the settlement to the Qing. In 1895, German diplomat Alfred Pelldram demanded a concession "as a reward for forcing Japan to return to the Liaodong peninsula", whose delimitations would have included the American concession. Upon receiving the word, Diplomat Chief Charles Denby Jr. protested, arguing the Americans retained jurisdiction over the concession, even though the actual settlement was handed over to the Chinese government. The crisis was resolved after Germany recognized American claims, and the government once again declared they would rescind their jurisdiction over the American settlement in June 1896.

=== Boxer Rebellion ===
American attitudes shifted following the Boxer Rebellion. For the American involvement in suppressing the Boxers, envoy Edwin Conger requested a restoration of the concession in Tianjin. Fearing foreign retaliation, the Qing sought statements from the British and Germans, promoting protests from Conger and his successor James Ragsdale. Faced with foreign inaction, Li Hongzhang and Yuan Shikai proposed giving another piece of land to the Americans, but they were rejected.

Qing officials then offered two other areas, which were rebuffed for their remote location. Ragsdale believed that a new settlement would provide American expatriates legal protection and economic prosperity. Despite this, the State Department requested Ragsdale to cease further consideration of a settlement in Tientsin; at this point, an "international concession", such as the ones in Kulangsu and Shanghai, were more favorable to Congress. The American concession was then officially absorbed into the British concession on October 23, 1902, as the British concession's Southern Extension, with agreements made by Edwin Conger and his British diplomatic counterpart, Sir Ernest M. Satow.

== Life in the concession ==
Compared to its British counterpart, the American settlement was poorly developed, described as "unsightly" by foreigners and "full of dirt" by the British envoy to China in 1902. The central neighborhoods of Zhujia (朱家胡同) and Xinghua Village (杏花村) were lined with brothels. Following the dispute with Germany, Denby once again began to assert American authority by establishing a local patrol as well as introducing a taxation system for the settlement's businesses.

American presence in the settlement steadily declined across the late 19th century; by 1902, envoy Conger noted the small number of American nationals in Tianjin (only 85), with none of the five American firms in Tianjin situated in the settlement itself. Two companies which had established themselves on the settlement, China Merchants Steam Navigation Company, Ltd., and the Chinese Engineering and Mining Company (CEMC), occupied the prime riverine real estate in the settlement. Although both were established state companies by the Qing, the amount of foreign capital in both (and with CEMC becoming a British-owned company in 1901) ultimately weakened American economic strength in the settlement itself, further supporting the State Department's decision to liquidate its control over the concession.

== See also ==
- Concessions in Tianjin
- American Concession (Shanghai), the other American territory in the Qing dynasty
- Concessions of China
- Map of concessions in Tianjin (in Chinese)
- Belgian colonial empire
