= German Club, Sydney =

The German Club
- Der Deutsche Verein
- The German Club premises at 89 Phillip Street, Sydney, c. 1900.
- Formation: 1853
- Dissolved: 1915
- Location: 89 Phillip Street, Sydney
- Coordinates: 33°51′58″S 151°12′41″E

The German Club (German: Der Deutsche Verein) was a private club founded in 1853 and located in Sydney, New South Wales, at 89 Phillip Street. Its membership was men-only and was the oldest gentlemen's club in Australia catering specifically to the German-Australian community prior to World War I, upon which by 1915 it had closed amid a tide of Anti-German sentiment in Australia.

== History ==
=== Early years ===
With the growing German community in the Colony of New South Wales in the second half of the 19th century, the club was established on 26 September 1853 as a result of the "want of a place of resort having been generally felt by the daily increasing number of educated people of different classes". It was established with the expressed purpose of being "a place of social resort open to the members for the purposes of reading, conversation, singing, etc."

Established prior to the unification of German in 1871, the club catered to Germans of all nationalities in the colony. In November 1858, the club, located on its new premises on Wynyard Square, hosted the crew of the Austro-Hungarian naval ship, SMS Novara, commanded by Bernhard von Wüllerstorf-Urbair, which was visiting Sydney as part of its round-the-world scientific expedition. In September 1857, a committee was set up at the club with the expressed purpose for sending another expedition to look for the missing explorer Ludwig Leichhardt, who was last heard of in 1848. The 1858 expedition was to be led by fellow explorer Augustus Gregory.

The club moved from Wynyard Square in 1862 in favour of new premises on O'Connell Street. By the 1880s, the club had moved to 55 Castlereagh Street. On 2 October 1890, a fire broke out in buildings adjacent to the club, resulting in significant damage as a result of the flames and falling masonry. As a consequence, the club was forced to move to new temporary premises at 29 Hosking Place until its new club house at 89 Phillip Street was completed. In August 1893, the new club house was completed at a cost of £10, 600 and membership that year stood at 150. The grand new club house was designed by Melbourne architect Richard Loweish, built by Eaton Brothers, and consisted of three floors with an additional basement level, bar, billiard room, dining hall, concert hall, reading and committee rooms and 13 rooms for accommodation on the top floor.

=== Closure ===
With the outbreak of World War I, the future of the German Club was uncertain, with many members leaving or being interned. In November 1914, the club was thoroughly searched by Police who noted that "In no instance, was anything discovered to cause it to be thought that these clubs were being used for purposes inimical to national interests." With the Australian German community facing great strain with the outbreak of war and rising anti-German sentiment, the club resolved to establish a small fund "for the use of distressed Germans in New South Wales." Meanwhile, in Parliament the Premier, William Holman, was asked on 13 November 1914 whether it was his government's intention to revoke the licenses of the various German clubs in Sydney. Holman replied it was not and, in any case, he "was not in favor or an attitude of unnecessary hostility being adopted to German residents."

On 13 May 1915, the Secretary of the German Club notified the Inspector-General of Police, James Mitchell, that it was the club's intention to voluntarily close given the heightened threat of damage and violence with Anti-German sentiment rising in Sydney following the sinking of the RMS Lusitania on 7 May. This did not deter attention from the club, however, because as the war developed so did anti-German hatred continue to grow within the city. Thus attention continued to be given by the public and the press to anything remotely German within the city. The Mirror of Australia on 10 October 1915, in a similar vein, reported that the German club premises were being used to house Germans who had been rejected from other hotels within the city: "Why should the members of these institutions be permitted the slightest consideration whilst their countrymen are committing outrages in the highways and byways of Europe?".

On 1 December 1915, the closed club premises were attacked by a mob of soldiers who threw stones, breaking every facade window of the club. The mob was shortly after broken up by police, assigned to protect the property from damage. One soldier, Private Gordon Robertson, was apprehended by police and charged with malicious damage and riotous behaviour. Robertson appeared before Special Magistrate Clarke and was fined £5 for each offence, and ordered to pay £1, 2 shillings, in damages. Clarke noted to Robertson that "There is too much of this kind of thing. You are a disgrace to the military uniform and a disgrace to Australia." Later that month, the club made an application to renew its license, intending to eventually reopen. However the Licensing Court refused to entertain such a renewal until after the war.

=== Club premises ===
By December 1916, the club had entirely closed and the premises were put up for sale. After a protracted sale process, in April 1917 the club became the home of the Highland Society of New South Wales, which undertook some minor alteration in 1921. The Highland Society remained there until December 1932 when the former club premises were again sold to the Commonwealth Wool and Produce Company Ltd, which undertook substantial alterations to the interior in 1933 to accommodate their offices. The former club house was eventually demolished in 1947 when it was resumed by the City of Sydney in a road expansion scheme in the CBD. Many of the traditions of the German Club were continued by its sister club since 1883, the Concordia Club, which today also goes by the secondary name of Deutscher Verein (DV; "German Club").

== Notable members ==
- Ernst Betche, (1851–1913) horticulturist and botanist.
- C.H.E. Blackmann, (1835–1912) also vice president, leading Sydney architect.
- Herman Henry Groth, (1832–1903) oil and colour merchant, Mayor of Enfield.
- Wilhelm von der Heyde, (1829–1896) also president, tobacco merchant and 2nd Mayor of Strathfield (1886–1888), also Consul for Spain (1891–1896).
- Adolphus Frederic Feez, (1826–1869), merchant and builder of Kirribilli House.
- Carl Ludwig Sahl, (1840–1897) also president, Consul for Germany (1872–1897).

== See also ==
- Australian Club
- German Club, Adelaide
- List of London's Gentleman's clubs
