= Hans Hermann Eschke =

German diplomat (1856–1904)

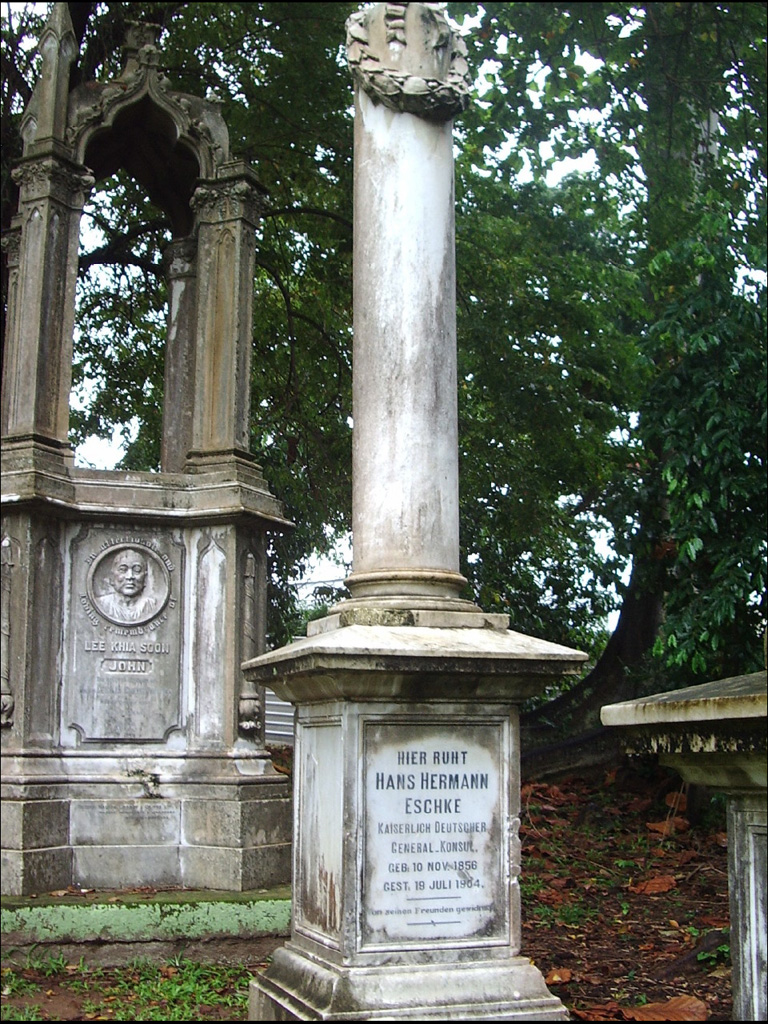
- Eschke's funerary monument in Fort Canning Green, Singapore

1st Consul-General of the German Empire in the Straits Settlements
- In office 1889 – 19 July 1904
- Succeeded by: Richard Kiliani

Personal details
- Born: 10 November 1856 Berlin, Germany
- Died: 19 July 1904 (aged 47) Singapore, Straits Settlements
- Resting place: Bukit Timah Cemetery (exhumed 1971)
- Spouse: Olga Sohst
- Relations: Prof. Hermann Eschke (father)

Military service
- Branch/service: Landwehr
- Rank: Hauptmann (Captain)

Hans Hermann Eschke (10 November 1856 in Berlin – 19 July 1904 in Singapore) was the first German Consul General in Singapore.

== Early life ==
Eschke was the son of Professor Hermann Eschke (1823–1900), a prominent marine and landscape painter in Berlin, Germany. His father's close connections with officials at the court of the German Emperor are said to have been a crucial factor in Hans Hermann Eschke's advancement in the diplomatic service, which eventually led to him being posted to Singapore in 1889.

Eschke, who was a jurist, initially joined the Prussian Ministry of Justice. Later, he served as an attaché at the German embassy in London, after which he was sent to Singapore in 1889 as consul – the first career diplomat in the German Foreign Office to hold this post in Singapore. The German Empire was interested in widening its sphere of influence in the region, particularly in Qingdao, China.

== Arrival in Singapore ==
In Singapore, Eschke joined a circle of German merchants. Very soon after his arrival he had met Olga Sohst, daughter of the well-known German merchant and honorary consul Theodor Sohst. Olga and Hans married just three months after he set foot in Singapore. Olga's dowry enabled the young couple to buy their own house, "Mount Rosie".

== Diplomatic career ==
Towards the end of 1898, Eschke was appointed the German Resident Minister in Bangkok, a temporary posting which lasted just over a year. During this period, his father-in-law Theodor, who had acted as the German honorary consul in Singapore before Eschke's arrival there, replaced him. In 1901, the German Consulate in Singapore was upgraded to a Consulate General and Eschke became the first Imperial German Consul General. That same year, his administrative jurisdiction was extended to the Johor Sultanate.

In January 1902, Eschke, still based in Singapore, was concurrently appointed consul for the British-controlled part of Borneo, Brunei, Sarawak, Labuan, and the Federated Malay States. He was also in charge of the Austro-Hungarian Consulate General. In December 1903, he took charge of the Turkish Consulate General as well. He had previously performed the same function at the local Russian diplomatic mission. For much of his time in Singapore, Eschke was the doyen of the consular corps. He held the rank of Hauptmann (Captain) in the Landwehr.

== Demise ==
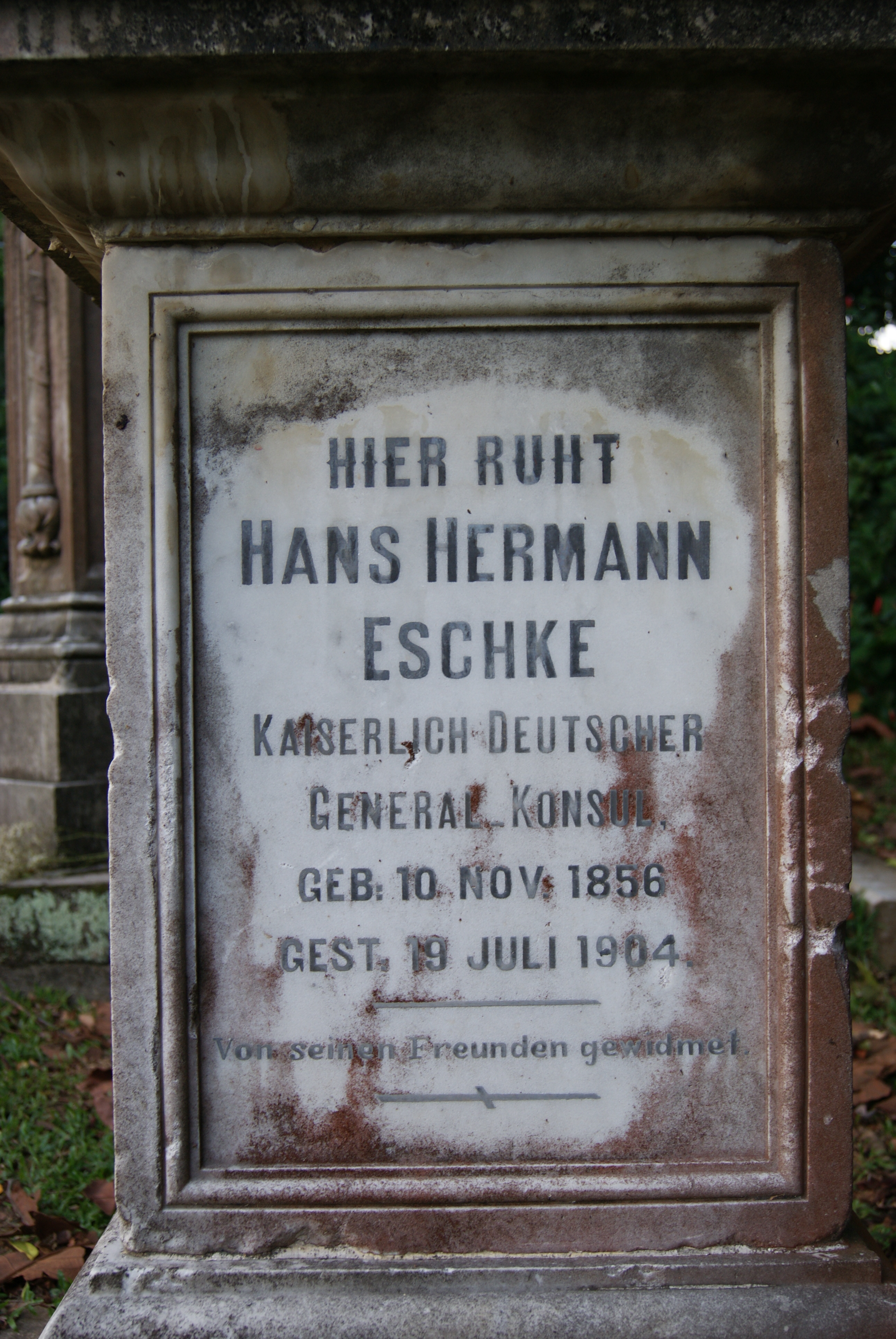
The inscription on Eschke's gravestone

Eschke was held in high esteem in Singapore throughout his stay in the Straits, not only for representing German interests, but also as an "adopted" Singaporean by the locals, having lived there so long. These sentiments were echoed and emphasised in the local press following his unexpected death after a sudden and nasty bout of dysentery in July 1904. He was 47.

Both the Straits Times and the now-defunct Singapore Free Press and Mercantile Advertiser carried detailed obituaries. The Singapore Free Press wrote:

Amongst his own people he had earned by his devotion to German interests a striking popularity, and those members of the general community who were not brought into familiar relations with him by nationality and mother tongue, had learned to recognise his sterling qualities, and estimate correctly his upright principles.

Eschke's grave was originally located at the Bukit Timah Cemetery, which was cleared in 1971 and turned into a park. Twelve grave monuments, including that of Eschke, were relocated to Fort Canning Green.
