= Hans Mühlenfeld =

German politician and diplomat (1901–1969)

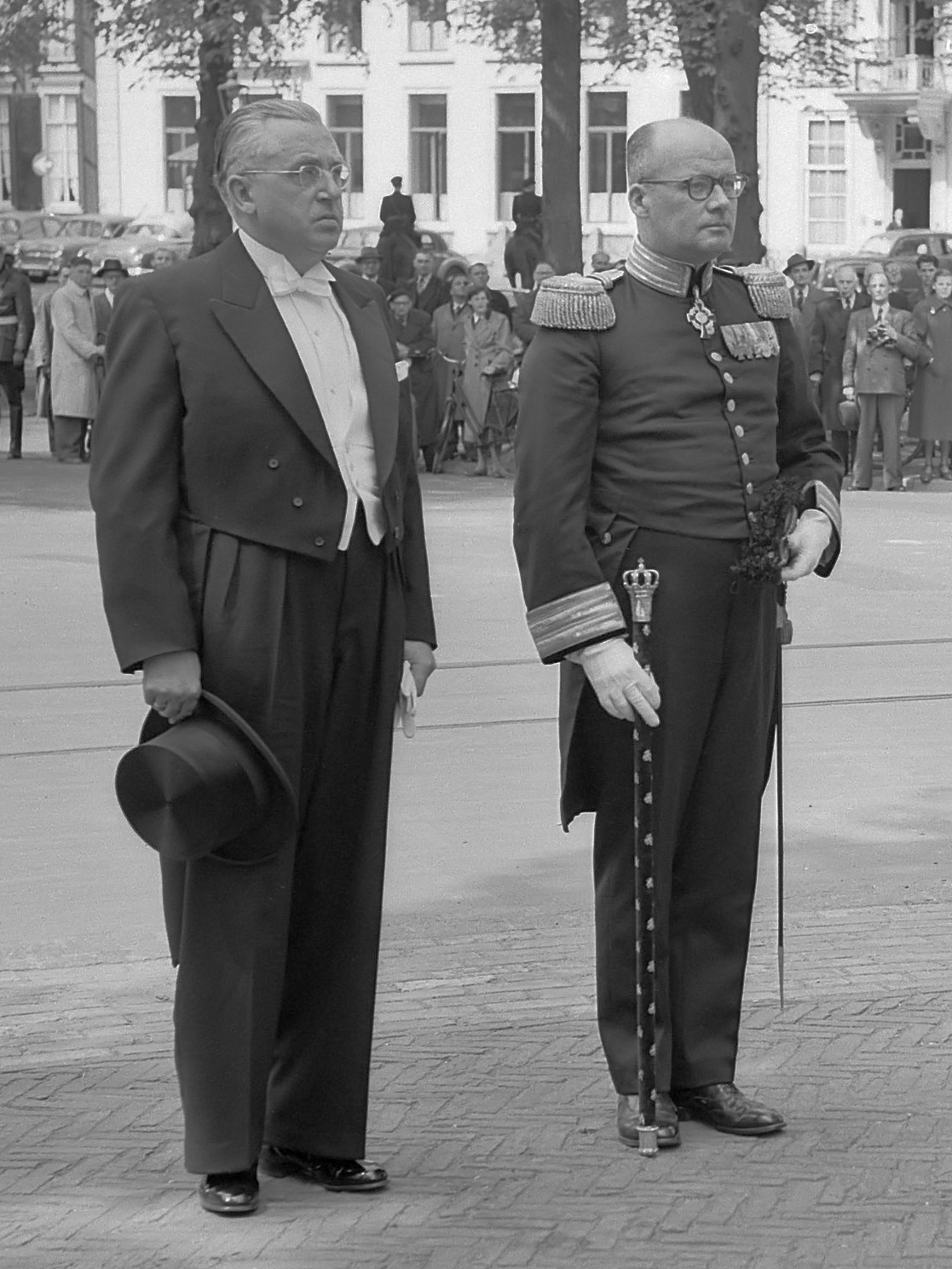
- Ambassador Mühlenfeld (left) being received by Queen Juliana of the Netherlands, 12 May 1953.

Ambassador of Germany to Australia
- In office August 1958 – September 1962
- Preceded by: Walther Hess
- Succeeded by: Joachim Ritter

Lower Saxony Minister of Culture
- In office 12 June 1963 – 24 April 1965
- Prime Minister: Georg Diederichs
- Preceded by: Richard Voigt
- Succeeded by: Richard Langeheine

Member of the Bundestag
- In office 7 September 1949 – 15 May 1953
- Constituency: Lower Saxony List

Personal details
- Born: 11 September 1901 Hanover, Prussia
- Died: 14 October 1969 (aged 68) Isernhagen, Lower Saxony, West Germany
- Party: DP (1947–1960); FDP (1960–1967)

Hans Mühlenfeld (11 September 1901 – 14 October 1969) was a German politician and diplomat who served as the second Ambassador to Australia and Ambassador to the Netherlands.

== Early life and education ==
Born in Hanover, Prussia, on 11 September 1901, after school education Mühlenfeld studied law and political science at the University of Göttingen where he was granted his doctor of law. In the summer semester of 1929 he became member of Burschenschaft Hannovera (fraternity). After passing his state examination, he worked as a corporate lawyer.

== Political and diplomatic career ==
After the war in 1945, Mühlenfeld was a co-founder and from 1950 deputy chairman of the German Party (DP). In 1947 he was elected as a member of the Landtag of Lower Saxony and in 1949 Mühlenfeld was elected on the Lower Saxony List of the German Party in the first Bundestag. As parliamentary Group Vice Chairman, in September 1950 Mühlenfeld took over as Parliamentary Chairman of the German party after the death of Friedrich Klinge.

Mühlenfeld resigned from the Bundestag on 15 May 1953 in order to take up an appointment as Ambassador of the Federal Republic of Germany in the Netherlands. This office he held until 1958, when he was appointed to succeed Walther Hess as Ambassador to Australia, where he served until 1962. As Ambassador he facilitated a donation of 1000 modern German books to the National Library of Australia and an exhibition of fine German works of literature.

After the merger of the German Party in 1960 he left his former party and returned to the Landtag of Lower Saxony from 1963 to 1967 as a member of the FDP. From 1963 to 1965 he served in the state SDP-FDP government of Georg Diederichs as Minister of Culture.

Party political offices
Preceded by Friedrich Klinge	Chairman of the Bundestag Group of the German Party; 1950–1953	Succeeded by Hans-Joachim von Merkatz
Diplomatic posts
Preceded by Werner von Holleben	Ambassador of Germany to the Netherlands; 1953–1958	Succeeded by Josef Löns
Preceded by Walther Hess	Ambassador of Germany to Australia; 1958–1962	Succeeded by Joachim Ritter
Political offices
Preceded by Richard Voigt	Lower Saxony Minister of Culture; 1963–1965	Succeeded by Richard Langeheine
