= Christoph Müller (diplomat) =

German diplomat (born 1950)

Dr Christoph Müller

Ambassador of Germany to Australia
- In office 27 September 2011 – June 2016
- President: Christian Wulff; Joachim Gauck
- Preceded by: Michael Witter
- Succeeded by: Anna Prinz

Ambassador of Germany to Peru
- In office July 2006 – 4 August 2011
- President: Horst Köhler
- Preceded by: Roland Kliesow
- Succeeded by: Joachim Schmillen

Personal details
- Born: 20 December 1950 (age 75) Herrsching am Ammersee, Starnberg, Bavaria
- Occupation: Diplomat

Dr Christoph Müller (born. 20 December 1950) is a former German diplomat and was Ambassador of the Federal Republic of Germany in Canberra, Australia. He has been in the service of the German Foreign Office since 1981 and has served previously as Ambassador to Peru from 2006 to 2011.

== Early life and education ==
Born in Herrsching am Ammersee in Bavaria on 20 December 1950, after school education he received his National Service training as a reserve officer with the Gebirgsjäger division from 1970 to 1972. After graduating in law from the University of Augsburg and LMU Munich, in 1980, Müller was awarded a Master of Arts from the Fletcher School of Law and Diplomacy at Tufts University in Medford, Massachusetts. In 1984, he obtained a Doctor of Laws from the University of Augsburg with a dissertation on the subject of: "Human Rights as a Foreign Policy Goal. The example of American politics in the years 1973–1980."

== Diplomatic career ==
In 1981, he entered the German Foreign Office and received his first posting to the Permanent Mission of Germany to NATO in Brussels from 1983 to 1985. Returning to Bonn, Müller was posted to the Arms Control Directorate from 1985 to 1987, before being posted to the German Embassy in Beijing, China from 1988 to 1990. In 1990, Müller became the Deputy Head of the German Delegation to the Conference on Disarmament in Geneva and was involved in negotiations to finalise the Chemical Weapons Convention in 1993.

In 1993 Müller returned to the Foreign Office in Bonn to be Deputy Head of the Public International Law Division and in 1996 was sent to Harare, Zimbabwe, to become the Deputy Chief of Mission of the embassy there. In 1998, he was sent on to New Delhi as the head political officer until 2000 when he was sent back to Germany to the new Foreign Office headquarters in Berlin to manage the South Asia Desk and Task Force on Afghanistan. He worked there until 2006 when he received his first high-level posting as Ambassador to Peru. It was as Ambassador that Müller hosted Chancellor Angela Merkel during her visit to Peru from 15 to 17 May 2008.

In September 2011, Müller was appointed Ambassador to Australia and succeeded Michael Witter, who was made ambassador to Morocco. As ambassador to Australia, he received non-resident accreditation for Papua New Guinea, Vanuatu, Nauru and the Solomon Islands. As ambassador during the First World War centenary, Müller participated in commemorations for the 1914 Battle of Cocos and stated that "In both countries we reflect on the failure of politics and diplomacy in 1914, and on the conclusions to be drawn to jointly prevent any recurrence of such a catastrophe in today’s world." In April 2015 Müller became a member of the newly established Australia-Germany Advisory Group which "will work to identify opportunities for increased trade and investment, cooperation in the Indo-Pacific and other regions of the world, cultural and social links and scientific collaboration." He was active in promoting ThyssenKrupp Marine Systems' bid for the Royal Australian Navy's Collins-class submarine replacement project.

Diplomatic posts
Preceded by Roland Kliesow	Ambassador of Germany to Peru; 2006 – 2011	Succeeded by Joachim Christoph Schmillen
Preceded by Michael Witter	Ambassador of Germany to Australia; 2011 – 2016	Succeeded by Anna Prinz
