= Christoph Gottlob Müller =

German Methodist leader

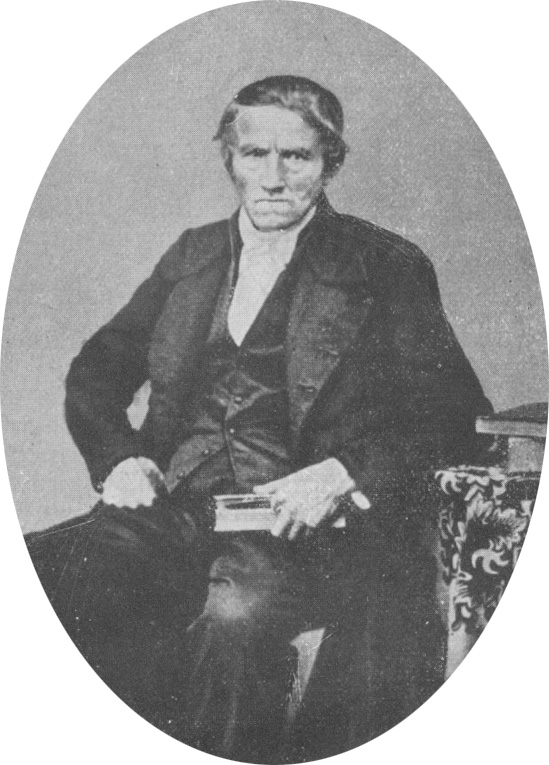
Christoph Gottlob Müller

Christoph Gottlob Müller (1785–1858) is generally considered to be the founder of the Wesleyan Church in Germany. He converted himself to Methodism around 1806, after he had fled to England during the Napoleonic Wars.
