= List of ambassadors of Germany to Australia =

Ambassador of Germany to Australia
- Auswärtiges Amt
- Style: His Excellency
- Reports to: Minister for Foreign Affairs
- Residence: Embassy of Germany, Canberra
- Appointer: President of Germany
- Inaugural holder: Dr Walther Hess
- Formation: 1952
- Website: Missions of the Federal Republic of Germany in Australia

The ambassador of Germany to Australia is an officer of the German Foreign Office and the head of the Embassy of the Federal Republic of Germany to the Commonwealth of Australia. The position has the rank and status of an ambassador extraordinary and plenipotentiary and holds non-resident accreditation for Nauru, Papua New Guinea, the Solomon Islands and Vanuatu. The ambassador is based with the embassy in Yarralumla in Canberra but initially from 1952 to 1958 was based in Sydney.

The ambassador is currently Markus Ederer since September 2022, who was most recently ambassador of the European Union to Russia. Germany and Australia have enjoyed diplomatic relations since 1952, although official consular representation existed in Sydney and Melbourne since 1879 and an embassy for the German Democratic Republic, with its own ambassador, also existed between 1972 and 1990. The Consulate in Sydney was also re-established in 1952 with Reinhold Renauld von Ungern-Sternberg appointed until 1956.

== Officeholders ==
=== Consuls-general of the German Empire for Australia, 1879–1914 ===
Based in Sydney, with responsibility for "Australia, Tasmania, New Zealand and the Fiji-Islands".

Incumbent	Start of term	End of term
Dr Richard Krauel	1879	1885
Gustav Travers	1885	1887
Alfred Pelldram	1887	1897
Peter Kempermann	1897	1900
Paul von Buri	1900	1906
Dr Georg Irmer	1906	1911
Richard Kiliani	1911	1914

=== Consuls-general of Germany for Australia, 1923–1939 ===
Based in Melbourne from 1923 to 1928, then moved to Sydney. Diplomatic relations were severed on 5 September 1939 and Switzerland acted as repository for German interests thereafter.

Incumbent	Start of term	End of term
Dr Hans Büsing	1923	1932
Dr Rudolf Asmis	1932	5 September 1939

=== Ambassadors of the Federal Republic of Germany ===
Incumbent	Start of term	End of term
Dr Walther Hess	9 July 1952	August 1958
Dr Hans Mühlenfeld	August 1958	September 1962
Dr Joachim Ritter	February 1963	March 1968
Dr Hans Schirmer	May 1968	May 1970
Dr Heinz Voigt	August 1970	October 1974
Dr Horst Blomeyer-Barstenstein	January 1975	April 1980
Wilhelm Fabricius	August 1980	August 1985
Dr Hans Schauer	August 1985	August 1991
Dr Franz Keil	August 1991	February 1994
Dr Klaus Zeller	February 1994	October 1998
Dr Horst Bächmann	October 1998	May 2002
Dr Klaus-Peter Klaiber	July 2002	June 2005
Martin Lutz	July 2005	June 2008
Dr Michael Witter	July 2008	August 2011
Dr Christoph Müller	27 September 2011	June 2016
Dr Anna Prinz	July 2016	July 2019
Dr Thomas Fitschen	August 2019	September 2022
Dr Markus Ederer	26 September 2022	2023
Beate Grzeski	2023	

=== Ambassadors of the German Democratic Republic, 1972–1990 ===
Incumbent	Start of term	End of term
Hans Richter	22 December 1972	1977
Dr Gerhard Lindner	24 February 1977	1982
Joachim Elm	12 March 1982	1989
Ernst Kube	20 November 1989	3 October 1990

== See also ==
- Germany–Australia relations
- Foreign relations of Germany
