= Xiaobailou Subdistrict =

Xiaobailou Subdistrict 小白楼街道
- Subdistrict
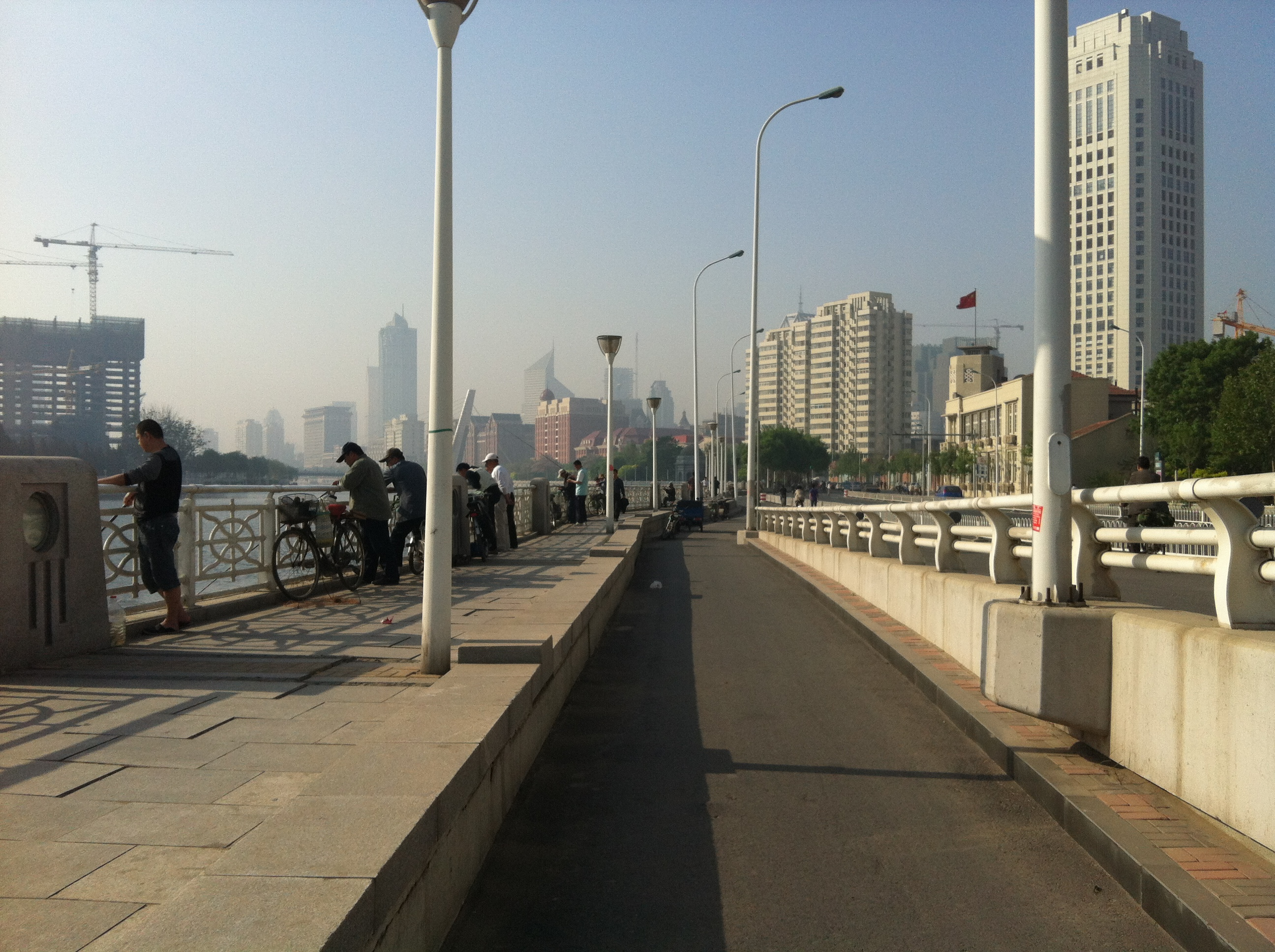
- Binjiang Road near Hai River, 2012

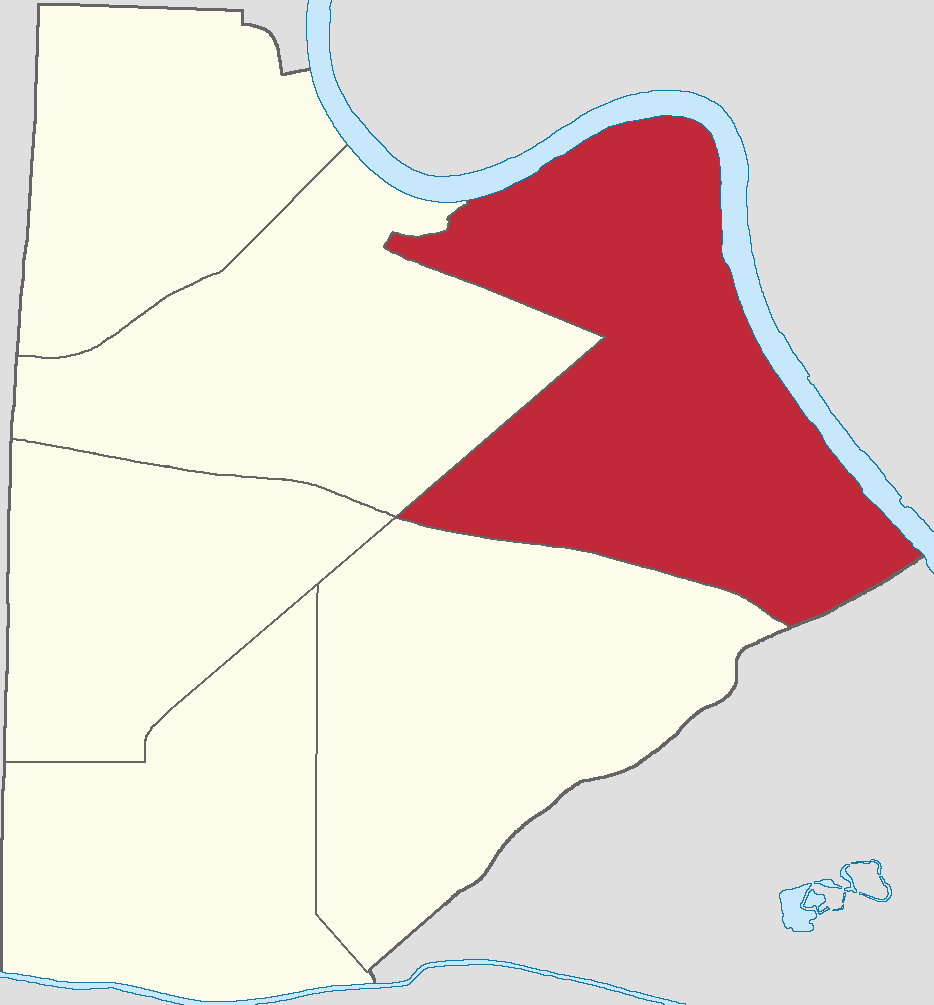
- Location of Xiaobailou Subdistrict within Heping District

- Location within Tianjin Location within China
- Coordinates: 39°07′05″N 117°12′22″E
- Country: China
- Municipality: Tianjin
- District: Heping
- Village-level Divisions: 9 communities

Area
  - Total: 2.3 km^{2} (0.89 sq mi)
- Elevation: 8 m (26 ft)

Population (2010)
  - Total: 30,982
  - Density: 13,000/km^{2} (35,000/sq mi)
- Time zone: UTC+8 (China Standard)
- Postal code: 300041
- Area code: 022

Xiaobailou Subdistrict (simplified Chinese: 小白楼街道; traditional Chinese: 小白樓街道; pinyin: Xiǎobáilóu Jiēdào) is a subdistrict of Heping District, Tianjin. it borders Guangfudao Subdistrict in the north, Dawangzhuang Subdistrict in the east, Dayingmen and Wudadao Subdistrict in the south, and Quanyechang Subdistrict in the west. It was once part of the American concession of Tianjin. As of 2010, its population was 30,982.

The name Xiaobailou (Chinese: 小白楼; lit. 'Small White Building') originated back when this region was a foreign concession. Since the area did not have an official name yet, it was named after a two-story pub that was a local landmark.

== Geography ==
Xiaobailou Subdistrict is located on the west bank of Hai River.

== History ==
Timeline of Xiaobailou Subdistrict
Year	Status	Part of
1952 - 1955	Jiefangqiao Street	1st District, Tianjin
1952 - 1955	Xiaobailou Street Dagu Road Street	5st District, Tianjin
1955 - 1956	Jiefangqiao Subdistrict	1st District, Tianjin
1955 - 1956	Xiaobailou Subdistrict Dagu Road Subdistrict	5st District, Tianjin
1956 - 1958	Jiefangqiao Subdistrict	Heping District, Tianjin
1956 - 1958	Xiabailou Subdistrict	Xinhua District, Tianjin
1958 - 1960	Jiefangqiao Subdistrict Xiabailou Subdistrict	Heping District, Tianjin
1960 - 1962	Quanyechang People's Commune Xiaobailou People's Commune	Heping District, Tianjin
1962 - 1964	Jiefangqiao Subdistrict Xiaobailou Subdistrict Xinhua Road Subdistrict	Heping District, Tianjin
1964 - 1998	Jiefangqiao Subdistrict Xiaobailou Subdistrict	Heping District, Tianjin
1998–present	Xiaobailou Subdistrict	Heping District, Tianjin

== Administrative divisions ==
As of 2021, Xiaobailou Subdistrict was made up of the following 9 communities:

Subdivision names	Name transliterations
泰安道	Tai'andao
树德里	Shudeli
崇仁里	Chongrenli
承德道	Chengdedao
长春道	Changchundao
解放路	Jiefanglu
达文里	Dawenli
大同道	Datongdao
开封道	Kaifengdao

== Gallery ==
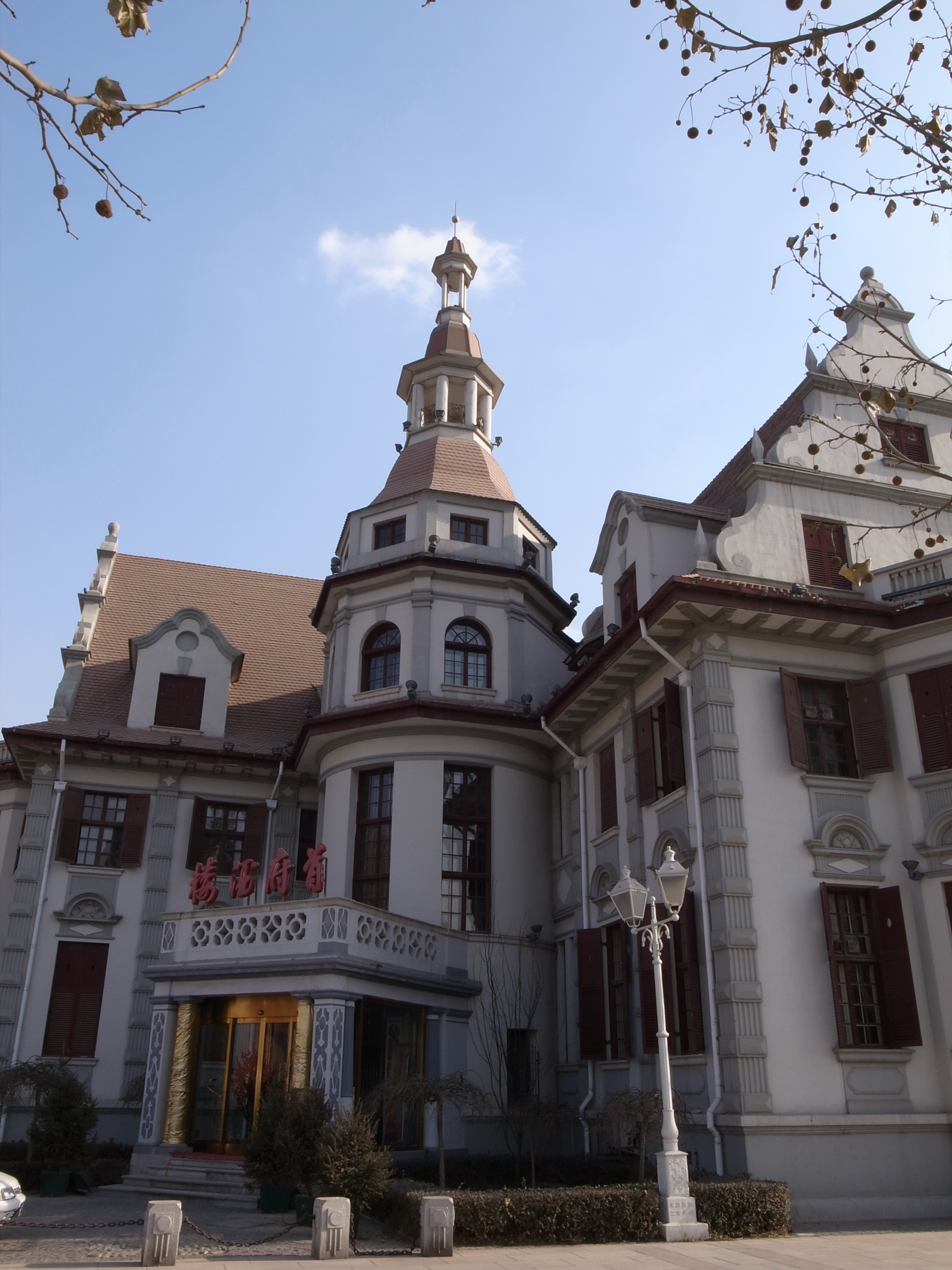
Former residence of Yuan Shikai, 2009

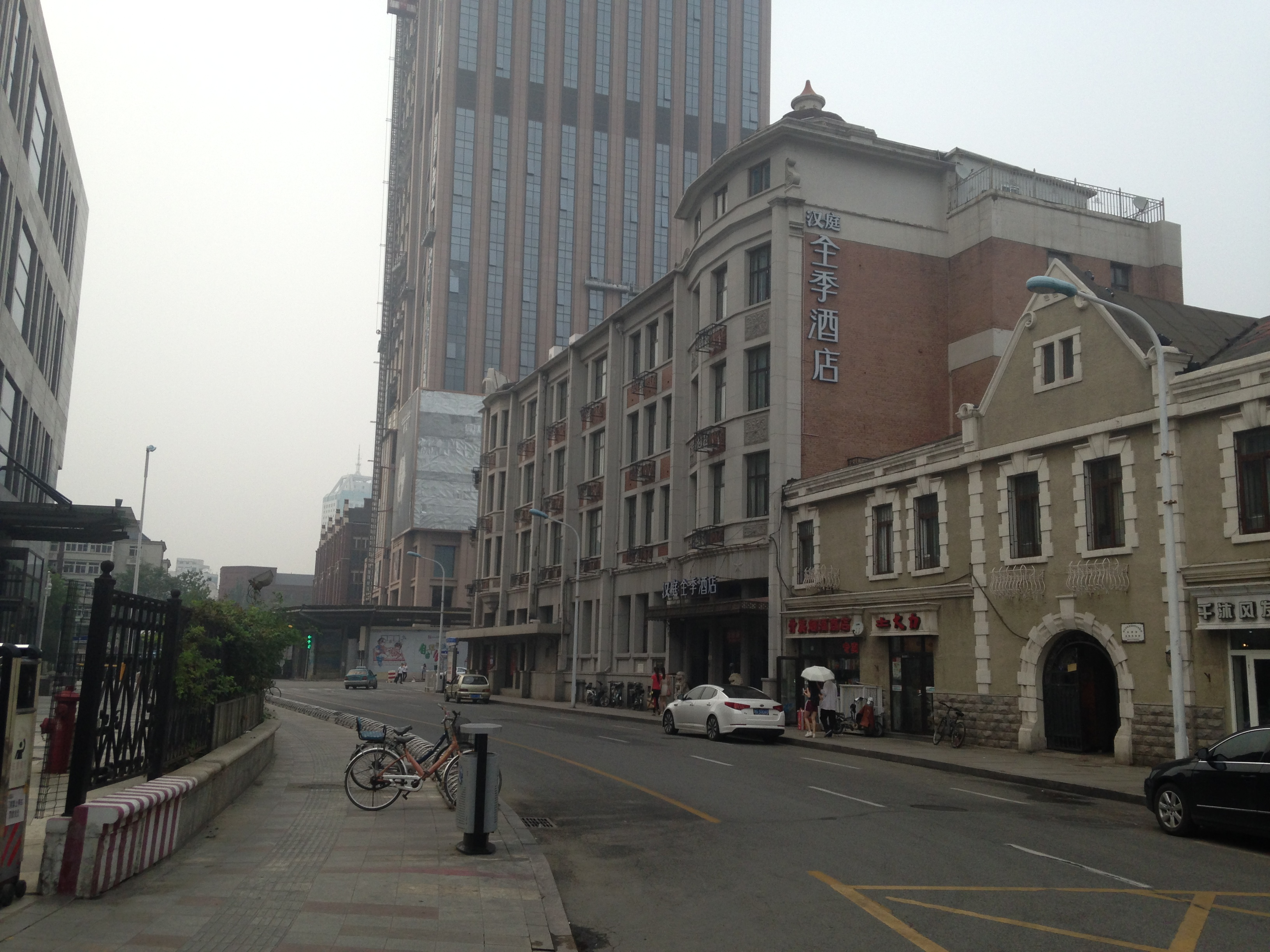
Zhejiang Road within the subdistrict, 2014

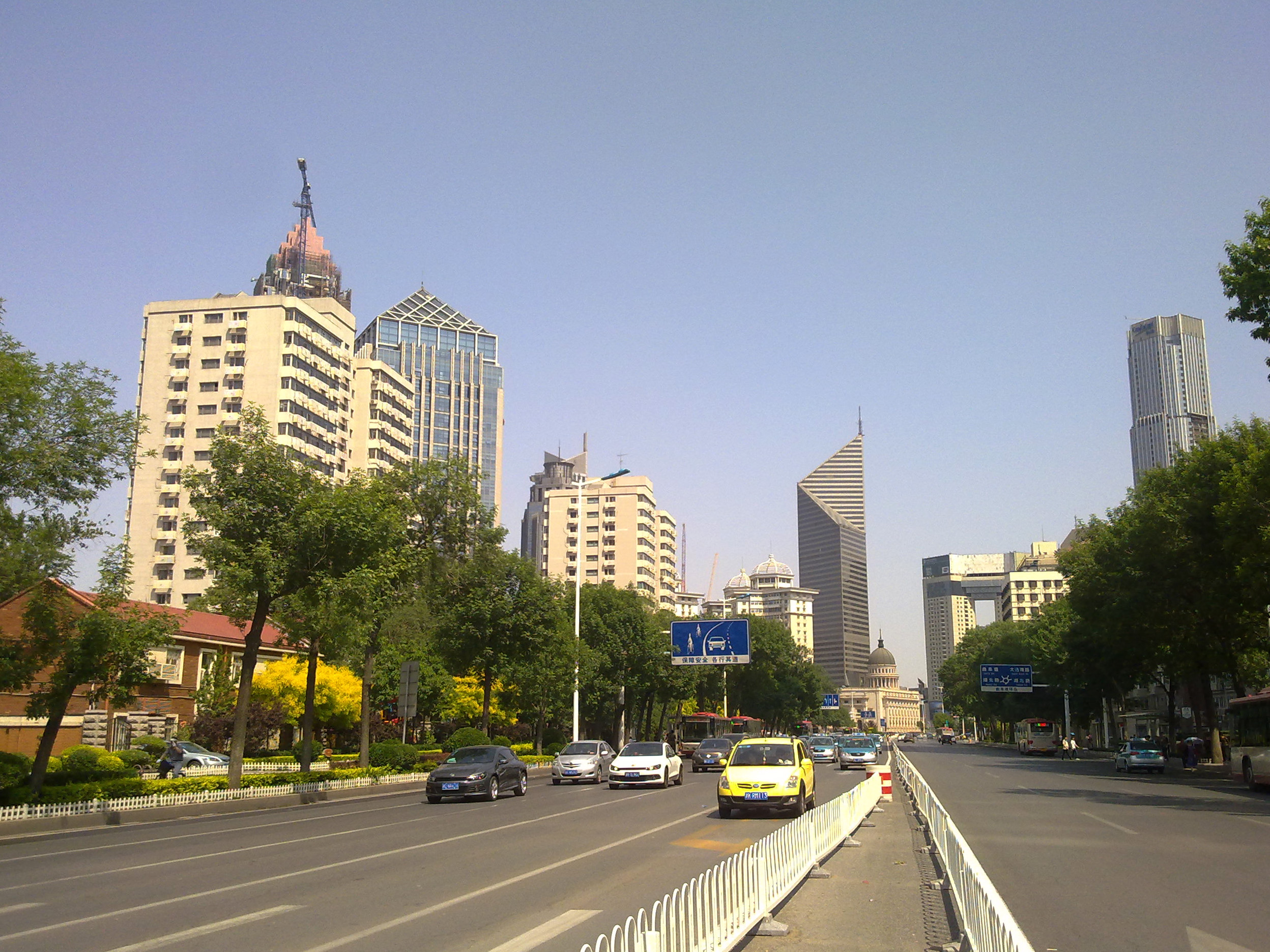
Nanjing Road on the south of the subdistrict, 2014

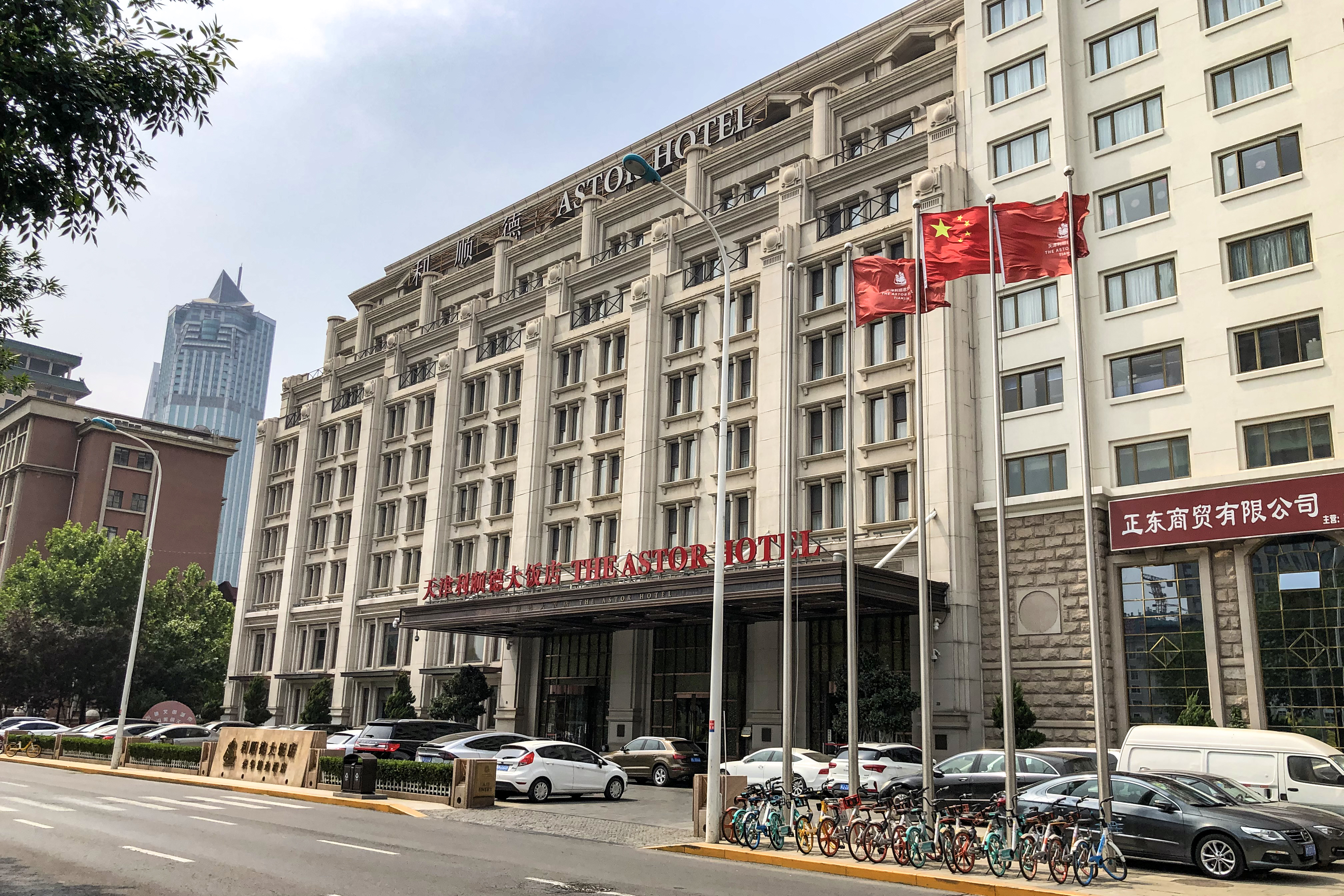
Astor Hotel in Tianjin, 2020
