= Alfred Pelldram =

German diplomat

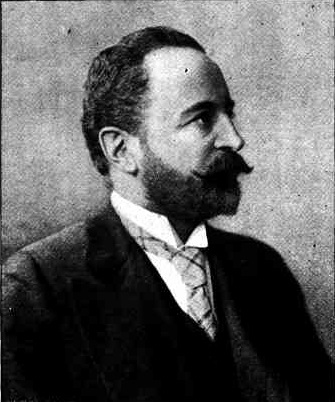

Consul-General of Germany for Australia
- In office 24 May 1888 – August 1897
- Preceded by: Gustav Travers
- Succeeded by: Peter Kempermann

Personal details
- Born: 1847 Sagan, Silesia, Prussia
- Died: 22 February 1906 (aged 58/59) Berlin, Prussia, Germany

Military service
- Allegiance: Prussia
- Branch/service: Prussian Army
- Years of service: 1867 – 1871
- Rank: Leutnant
- Unit: 2nd Guards Uhlans
- Battles/wars: Franco-Prussian War

Alfred Leopold Robert Moritz Pelldram (1847 – 22 February 1906) was a German diplomat who served as the Consul-General for Australia, Resident Minister to Haiti and Minister to Venezuela.

== Early life and background ==
Born in Sagan in the Prussian Province of Silesia in 1847, Pelldram passed the matriculation examination in 1865, and studied jurisprudence at the Ruprecht-Karls-Universität Heidelberg and the Friedrich-Wilhelms-Universität in Berlin from 1866 to 1869. In 1867, whilst a student in Berlin, Pelldram entered the 2nd Guards Uhlans Regiment, a reserve cavalry guards regiment of the Prussian Army in Berlin.

He was promoted to Leutnant (the equivalent of Second Lieutenant) in 1869 and on the outbreak of the Franco-Prussian War in 1870, served with his regiment as a part of the 2nd Guards Infantry Division in the Second Army commanded by Prince Friedrich Karl of Prussia. Pelldram served with distinction throughout the war, including in such engagements as Mars-la-Tour, Gravelotte, Sedan, the Siege of Paris, Orleans and Le Mans. For his service he received the Iron Cross Second Class in 1870.

With the end of the war and the establishment of the German Empire in 1871, Pelldram resumed his career in the law and was appointed to the law courts of Breslau and in 1873 was promoted to the Superior Court at Wiesbaden. In 1875, Pelldram was appointed an assistant Judge at Wiesbaden.

== Diplomatic career ==
In 1876, Pelldram entered the service of the Imperial Foreign Office and a year later was posted to the Consulate-General in Odessa, Russian Empire and not long after as a Vice-Consul at the German Embassy in St. Petersburg under Ambassador Hans Lothar von Schweinitz. In 1881 Pelldram was sent to China to serve as Consul in Tientsin and then to Canton and Hong Kong in 1885. In 1886 Pelldram was sent to Cairo as Consul-General and then Consul for Caucasia and Transcaucasia at Tiflis in 1887.

In 1888 arrived in the Colony of New South Wales to serve as Consul-General of Germany for Australia based in Sydney, with additional responsibilities for New Zealand and Fiji. Pelldram was well receivedin the colony, with the Sydney Mail later noting: "In Herr Peldram we have a man of ' marked importance and ability,' and, as the Iron Cross conferred upon him testifies, of much higher qualities than the authority quoted laid down as a sine qua non." Pelldram served as acting-Consul for Austria-Hungary in 1893 and 1894 and consequently hosted Archduke Franz Ferdinand on his visit to Sydney in May 1893 on board the SMS Kaiserin Elisabeth. Pelldram also served as the Acting Consular Agent for Italy. Throughout his time in Sydney, Pelldram was assisted by the German Consul in Sydney, Carl Ludwig Sahl, who often officiated in his absence. When Sahl died in early 1897 Pelldram officiated at his funeral. In August 1897 Pelldram departed Sydney to take up an appointment as Consul-General in Antwerp.

In 1900 Pelldram was appointed as the German Resident Minister for Haiti in Port-au-Prince. Following the Venezuelan crisis of 1902–1903 he was posted as the Envoy Extraordinary and Minister Plenipotentiary to Venezuela in Caracas. Serving until 1906, Pelldram, in ill health returned to Germany and died in Berlin on 22 February 1906.

== Honours ==
- Iron Cross, Second Class (1870).

Diplomatic posts
| Preceded by – | German Consul in Tientsin; 1881–1885 | Succeeded by – |
| Preceded by Gustav Travers | Consul-General of Germany for Australia; 1888–1897 | Succeeded by Peter Kempermann |
| Preceded by Christian Gustav Michahelles | Resident Minister of Germany to Haiti; 1900–1903 | Succeeded by Eugen von Zimmerer |
| Preceded by Otto Ludwig Schmidt-Leda | German Minister to Venezuela; 1903–1906 | Succeeded by Edwin Freiherr von Seckendorff |
