= Wes Olson =

Australian military historian (born 1960)

Wesley John Olson (born 1960), known as Wes Olson, is an independent researcher and author based in Perth, the capital of Western Australia. His work has concentrated on Australian military history during both World Wars.

Olson researched the loss of HMAS Sydney in World War II for nearly a decade before publication of his first book in 2000 by UWA Publishing, after which he became recognised as an independent authority on the ship and its lost crew. His research proved of great importance in the eventual location of the wreck and that of its adversary the German auxiliary cruiser Kormoran in 2008. One of Olson's most notable works about World War I is his history of Western Australian involvement in the Gallipoli campaign of the first world war. This work was followed in 2018 by Olson's account of the cruise of the German raider SMS Emden in 1914.

A feature of Olson's works is his use of contemporary diaries (from friend and foe alike), leading to a sense of 'being there' in and around the action, bringing both the heroism and horrors of war from the perspective of both sides in the conflict into stark and immediate focus.

== Life ==
In May 1977, Olson commenced work with the Western Australian Government Railways as a junior station assistant. At age 18 he transferred to the locomotive branch and after commencing training to become a locomotive driver was appointed driver in 1988. Olson is currently employed in that capacity by Pacific National.

Olson joined the Australian Army Reserve in 1978 and served a total of eight years as an infantryman, before marrying Dale Williamson in 1988 with whom he has three adult children. He became an honorary associate, at the time equivalent to curator, at the Western Australian Museum because of his contribution to HMAS Sydney work throughout the 1990s. In 2004 Olson was made a life member of the Fremantle Mosman Park Cricket Club.

== Research and museological activities ==
With a boyhood interest in World War II British warship design, Olson learned of the Western Australian Maritime Museum's 50th anniversary international forum seeking to resolve the mysteries surrounding the loss of HMAS Sydney with all hands in November 1941 and to commence or facilitate a search. After contacting staff for a copy of the papers from the forum, it was learned that Olson also had a background in incident investigation with the railways and he was invited to join the museum's Department of Maritime Archaeology as a volunteer researcher assisting in its HMAS Sydney studies. Olson's first research task was to compile a comparative study examining all World War II vessels that had sunk in a similar manner or been severely damaged. After completing that database and producing an internal report, his next task was to examine whether a carley float with human remains onboard that was found at Christmas Island in 1942 could have come from HMAS Sydney. Olson's research not only disproved the then widespread belief the float was not of Australian naval origin, but it showed where it was stowed onboard the ship. From then he continued his research related to HMAS Sydney both independently and as an adviser to the museum. In 2021, DNA analysis helped identify the remains as those of Thomas Welsby Clark, Able Seaman of HMAS Sydney.

In 1997 Olson became a volunteer at the Army Museum of Western Australia. Initially given the role of researcher, he was subsequently appointed firearms keeper within the curatorial section. He then joined the gallery development committee and was involved in the development, construction and display of mannequins and weapons in the World War I, World War II and post-1945 galleries.

Olson left the Army Museum of Western Australia in 2013 and began assisting the Western Australian Museum with various military projects, including its plans to revisit the wreck of HMAS Sydney in association with Curtin University. Olson also assisted with the National Anzac Centre at Albany, and with exhibitions being developed for Boola Bardip, the museum's new facility in Perth. He also assisted Charles and Joan Walsh-Smith with the HMAS Sydney memorial at Geraldton, the HMAS Sydney memorial at Denham, the HMAS Perth memorial at East Fremantle, and the Battle of Crete memorial in Kings Park. In 2023 Olson assisted James Parkinson, Director of ROV Services Australia, to produce an information graphic of the wreck of SMS Emden at North Keeling Island.

== Books and their effect ==
Olson's first book, Bitter Victory: the death of HMAS Sydney, was published in 2000. The following year he chaired the archival committee for the Royal Australian Navy's HMAS Sydney Wreck Location Seminar that provided a location of the battle. Olson then became research assistant and historical advisor to David Mearns of Blue Water Recoveries prior to the 2008 search and discovery of HMAS Sydney and HSK Kormoran. The location his committee provided from historical data proved accurate.

His first ANZAC study Gallipoli – The Western Australian Story, published in 2006, was short-listed in the Western Australian History category of the Western Australian Premier's Book Awards for 2006, and he self-published Battalion into Battle – The History of the 2/11th Australian Infantry Battalion 1939-45 in 2011.

As a result of his earlier work on the subject, Olson became historical advisor before, during and after the Western Australian Museum and Curtin University expedition to revisit the wrecks of HMAS Sydney and HSK Kormoran in 2015. He then contributed to the subsequent book entitled From Great Depths – The Wrecks of HMAS Sydney (II) and HSK Kormoran that was published by UWA Publishing and the Western Australian Museum in 2016.

Olson's second naval book entitled HMAS Sydney (II) – In Peace and War (self-published in 2016) is a large 610-page volume which complements his 2000 work on the same subject, adding much more detail and availing itself of many personal diaries and accounts together with the evidence gleaned during the examination of the Sydney and Kormoran wrecks. His third naval work, The Last Cruise of a German Raider – The Destruction of SMS Emden (published by Seaforth Publishing in 2018) not only utilises many of the usual records available on both the raider and its Australian adversary HMAS Sydney, but has as its core many personal accounts and diaries from both ships. The Last Cruise thereby also becomes an account of being under fire and like his works on Gallipoli is both a celebration of bravery on both sides of the conflict and a testament to the horrors of war.

Olson's most recent ANZAC work, The Eleventh – The History of the 11th Australian Infantry Battalion 1914-1919, Volume 1, Gallipoli was self-published in 2023. In following his now-trademark extensive use of personal diaries Olson again makes war 'personal' and takes the reader into the camps, the trenches and the hospitals for those lucky enough to survive their injuries.

Wes Olson is currently working on his seventh book, Articulated Steam Locomotives of the Western Australian Government Railways, in conjunction with his cousin, Les Smith. He anticipates commencing work on The Eleventh – The History of the 11th Australian Infantry Battalion 1914-1919, Volume 2, The Western Front, in 2025.

== Publications ==
- Ellam, Raye; Ellam, Allan (2004), Olson, Wesley (ed.), Private David John Simcock, 11th Battalion, Australian Imperial Force: The bloke with the pink top, A. Ellam
- Olson, Wesley John (2000), Bitter Victory: The Death of HMAS Sydney, Nedlands: UWA Publishing, ISBN 1-876268-49-2, LCCN 2001326189, OCLC 45722719, OL 3990396M, Wikidata Q131399419
- Olson, Wesley (2016), HMAS Sydney (II) : in peace and war, Wesley John Olson, ISBN 978-0-9873348-1-7
- Olson, Wesley (2011), Battalion into battle : the history of the 2/11th Australian Infantry Battalion 1939-45, Wesley John Olson, ISBN 978-0-646-56363-3
- Olson, Wesley (2018), The last cruise of a German raider : the destruction of sms Emden, Seaforth Publishing, ISBN 978-1-5267-3729-8
