= Thomas Welsby Clark =

Royal Australian Navy sailor (1920–1941)

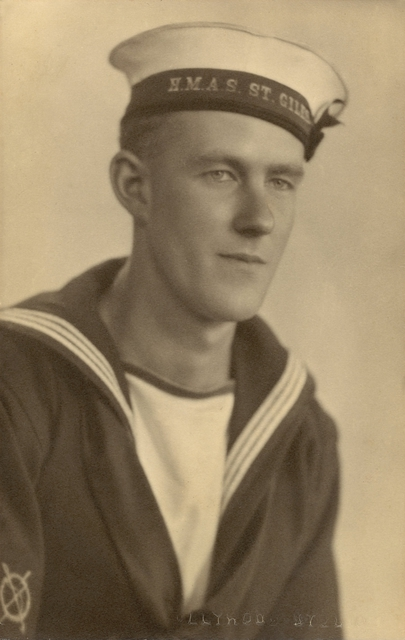
- Clark in 1940, as an Ordinary Seaman on HMAS St Giles
- Born: 28 January 1920; Brisbane, Queensland, Australia
- Died: c. 19 November 1941 (aged 21); HMAS Sydney, Indian Ocean
- Cause of death: Killed in action
- Body discovered: 6 February 1942, off Christmas Island
- Occupation: Sailor
- Known for: Only body recovered from sinking of HMAS Sydney; previously unidentified decedent

S4449 Able Seaman Thomas Welsby Clark was a sailor in the Royal Australian Navy (RAN), whose body was found on a life raft in the Indian Ocean, near Christmas Island, on 6 February 1942.

Before his body was identified, he was widely believed to originate from the RAN cruiser HMAS Sydney, which sank off Western Australia in November 1941 after a battle with the German auxiliary cruiser Kormoran. While 318 of 399 Kormoran personnel survived, all 645 members of the Sydney crew were lost. Clark was formally identified by DNA analysis in 2021, and the RAN publicly released his identity on 19 November 2021, the 80th anniversary of the battle.

== Background ==
Clark was born in Brisbane on 28 January 1920. He enlisted in the Royal Australian Navy on 23 August 1940, and was trained as a submarine detector at HMAS Cerberus and on HMAS St Giles. Clark joined Sydney's crew on 19 August 1941, and was promoted to Able Seaman several days later. He was newly engaged at the time of Sydney's sinking.

His body was found on 6 February 1942. It is reported that an inquest was held on Christmas Island, soon afterwards. His remains were buried with military honours, in an unmarked grave, in the Old European Cemetery on the island. At the Battle of Christmas Island on 31 March 1942, Japanese forces captured the island. They remained in control of the island until 1945. Records relating to the inquest were lost or destroyed during the occupation.

Witnesses on Christmas Island believed that the float and sailor had come from Sydney. A RAN investigation after the war included attempts by those who wrote the lost records of the inquest to reconstruct them. This investigation determined it was possible the body was a member of the RAN. Christmas Island's assistant harbour master, Captain E. Craig, stated that "the Carley float was typical of those in service with the RN and RAN". A government inquiry concluded "on the balance of probability, that the body and the carley float ... were most likely from HMAS Sydney."

An archaeological team commissioned by the RAN recovered the body in 2006. A DNA profile and other data about the individual's background were recovered. The remains were then reburied, in the closest Australian war cemetery to the wreck of Sydney, at Geraldton. Due to items found with the body, including clothing, it was considered most likely that he had been an engineering officer or NCO. By 2014 a process of elimination had established that no more than 50 members of the crew could have been the man on the Carley float.

In 2019 it was incorrectly reported by news media that Norman Douglas Foster was most likely to be the Sydney crew member in question. Foster, who was 28 years old at the time of Sydney's sinking, was an Engine Room Artificer, 4th Class (a rank equivalent to Petty Officer).

== Discovery of the body ==
During the late afternoon of 6 February 1942, 79 days after Sydney sank, lookouts on Christmas Island spotted an object out at sea. Initially thought to be a Japanese submarine, closer inspection from a pilot boat found it was a Carley float with a dead person inside. The float was then towed ashore. With the island at risk of invasion, the deceased was quickly examined by the harbour master, the medical officer and the man in charge of the radio station. The body was buried in an unmarked grave near Flying Fish Cove. The examiners wrote reports that were later destroyed when Japanese forces occupied Christmas Island. They would later recreate these reports from memory. An inquest was not convened until mid-February and had not concluded when evacuation began on 17 February in anticipation of Japanese forces occupying the island on 23 March. It is unknown if the doctor on Christmas Island had performed an autopsy as no report of him doing so was found.

=== Initial investigations and research ===
A preliminary examination in 1942 by the island's medical officer, Dr J. Scott Clark, found that the deceased was a tall young adult male caucasoid. The remains were partly decomposed, the eyes, nose and all of the flesh from the right arm were missing and believed to have been consumed by fish or birds. According to the Harbour Master, Captain J. R. Smith, the body was clothed in a blue boilersuit which had been bleached white by exposure, with four plain press studs from neck to waist. However, J. C. Baker, who was in charge of the radio station at Christmas Island, stated that the boilersuit was white. The body was not carrying dog tags or personal effects.

A shoe was found beside the body, which Clark did not believe belonged to the dead man. Later recollections of the shoe varied with Clark stating that it was "probably branded "CROWN BRAND PTY 4", although he had some doubts about "CROWN" and "4". Captain Smith recalled a canvas shoe of a brand named "McCOWAN PTY" or "McEWAN PTY", which carried symbols representing a crown and/or a broad arrow. A sergeant with the party who recovered the raft later contradicted the finding of a shoe, instead stating that a 'pair of boots' were found on the raft.

In Smith's opinion, the life raft was a naval Carley float, which had come from Sydney. The wooden decking was manufactured and branded with the word "PATENT" while the metal framework was branded "LYSAGHT DUA-ANNEAL ZINC. MADE IN AUSTRALIA" inside. The float had been damaged by gun or shellfire, with shrapnel embedded in the outer covering. The underside was covered with barnacles and other marine growth, indicating that it had been at sea for some time.

On 23 April 1949, the Director of Naval Intelligence wrote to the Director of Victualling (DNV) asking if the uniform worn by the dead man and the Carley float were consistent with the crew and equipment of Sydney. The DNV replied that while boilersuits with press studs had not been issued by the RAN at the time, officers could purchase their own boilersuits, usually white or brown, with press studs. The Navy issue boilersuits worn by ratings were blue, but did not have press studs. The DNV also stated that the shoes could "definitely" have been of RAN issue, especially if they were leather rather than canvas. There is no record of a reply regarding the Carley float.

=== Controversy regarding raft ===
The RAN claimed that the covering of the Carley float did not match those used by Australian warships and thus could not have come from Sydney. The historian Tom Frame was also sceptical about the raft and believed that its connections to Sydney were circumstantial. For many years, other authors, such as historian Barbara Winter (1984) and independent researcher Wes Olson (2000), disputed the official view put forward by the RAN. According to Olson, it was unclear how the RAN decided that the float cover was anomalous, as accounts of the float were often vague and contradictory. Olson said that the only detail of the covering in witness descriptions appeared to be that it was grey. Winter suggested that the currents of the Indian Ocean would have propelled a Carley float launched at the location and time of the battle to arrive in the vicinity of Christmas Island at around the time of its discovery. Olson stated that the rope used on the float and markings on the float were of naval origin. He also believed the descriptions of marine growth on the float matched the period that a float from Sydney would have been in the water. In 2000, Olson claimed that evidence presented at the 1998 inquiry had changed Frame's mind.

== Investigations since 1998 ==
=== Recovery of the body ===
The 1998 Joint Standing Committee for Foreign Affairs, Defence and Trade inquiry into the loss of Sydney recommended that attempts be made to find the grave, in order to exhume the body and acquire DNA for comparison with the next of kin of the crew of Sydney. This would determine if the unknown sailor was from the cruiser. The RAN searched the graveyard during August and September 2001 to no avail until a second search in October 2006 found the body. The body was found in an unusually-shaped coffin, which appeared to have been constructed around it as the body was buried "with legs doubled under at the knee." That was same position it had been in when found on the raft, possibly due to mummification. Press studs and small fragments of clothing were found in the coffin. Following an autopsy and sampling from the body for identification, the remains of the still unknown sailor were reburied in the Commonwealth War Graves section in the Geraldton Cemetery in Western Australia with full military honours on 19 November 2008.

=== Autopsy and subsequent research ===
Brain trauma caused by a shell fragment of German origin was identified as the cause of death. Bruce Billson (the Minister Assisting the Minister for Defence) reported that a piece of shrapnel struck the front of the skull and lodged in the left forehead. On first examination, it was thought that the fragment might have been a bullet but this hypothesis was later rejected. In addition to this injury, the pathologist identified a second major skull injury of bone loss on the left side, above and behind the left earhole. This injury was believed to have occurred around the time of death. The analysis also identified multiple rib fractures, but it is unknown whether these occurred around the time of death or long after death with the settling of the grave. No other shrapnel or projectiles have been found elsewhere in the remains.

The fragment was found embedded in the man's skull during an autopsy in 2006. Anatomical analysis indicated that the unknown sailor was aged between 22 and 31 when he died, was right-handed, had size 11 feet and was tall for his generation, between 168 and 188 cm (5 ft 6 in and 6 ft 2 in). Bone isotope analysis showed that he had lived in eastern Australia, probably New South Wales or Queensland, before enlistment and may have grown up on the coast. The unknown sailor had acquired an unusual feature in both ankle joints, known as squatting facets. These indicated that he was more used to squatting than sitting on chairs. As squatting was unusual at the time in urban western communities, it was speculated that the man had spent significant time in a rural area of Australia, amongst members of an ethnic group in which squatting was more common than sitting (such as people from Asia or Eastern Europe), and/or involved in a sporting or similar activity that required the ankles to be flexed towards the back of the thighs for prolonged periods.

Attempts to extract a DNA profile from the remains began around 2009, although the results were not published before the bone analysis. Analysis of the partial genetic profile recovered suggested that the man had red hair, blue eyes and pale skin, and was likely of Irish or Scottish descent. He belonged to a mitochondrial haplogroup (i.e. an ancient matrilineal line of descent) known as haplogroup J1c12. This relatively rare haplogroup has most often been found in people with matrilineal ancestors from various parts of Europe, the Caucasus or Middle East.

The boilersuit and shoe found with the body were, according to evidence provided by the Australian War Memorial, available to ship's officers, commissioned warrant officers, and warrant officers senior enough to have a watch keeping certificate. Tests on the remains of the boilersuit showed that the fabric had never been dyed, was probably white and the press studs were of a type manufactured by Carr Australia Pty Ltd in the 1930s and 1940s. RAN Dress Regulations published in the Navy List of December 1940 do not mention white boilersuits. There is evidence that during the period, boilersuits were a popular working dress among RAN personnel. Many RAN engineer officers wore white boilersuits most of the time and other officers, commissioned warrant officers and warrant officers also wore them. Two former RAN officers recalled being issued with a white boilersuit twice a year, that these were fastened with four or five press studs and that some had press studs at the wrist, while others did not. Dress regulations for December 1940 state that RAN personnel on "foreign" (tropical) stations were issued with a pair of white canvas shoes to be worn only on those stations. While veterans did not recall being issued with them or seeing them worn, photographs of RAN personnel from the period show some of them wearing white canvas shoes.

By 2014, the identity of the unknown sailor had been narrowed down to 50 members of the crew of Sydney. It had previously been reported in 2007 that the unknown sailor was most likely one of three engineering officers.

=== Erroneous identification ===
In August 2019, it was reported by media outlets including Channel 7 News and The West Australian, that the Sydney crew member most likely to have been buried on Christmas Island was Norman Douglas Foster. However this was not confirmed by official sources. Foster (service no. F2147), was an Engine Room Artificer (4th Class); a rank equivalent to Petty Officer. He was born in Perth on 15 April 1913, making him 28 years old at the time of Sydney being lost.

Foster's service record describes him as 5 ft 8 3/4 in (174 cm) tall, with auburn hair, blue eyes and a fair complexion. He had joined the RAN on 2 September 1939 (the day before the war began). After training at HMAS Cerberus, Foster had joined the crew of Sydney on 20 February 1941.

== Formal identification ==
In 2021, DNA testing identified the remains as those of Clark. The identity was revealed at the Australian War Memorial on 19 November 2021, the 80th anniversary of the battle. Clark is the only member of Sydney's crew known to have reached a life raft.

== See also ==
- List of people who disappeared mysteriously at sea

== Sources ==
- Billson, Bruce (12 February 2007). "Further Results in Relation to Christmas Island Remains". Press Release by the Minister Assisting the Minister for Defence. Department of Defence, Australian Government. Archived from the original on 2 June 2011.
- Smith, Brodie (4 January 2014). "Mystery HMAS Sydney sailor narrowed to one of 50 crew". Sydney Morning Herald.
- Chase, Katharina (November 2006). "Unravelling a World War II mystery". Defence Magazine.
- Cole, Terence RH (2009). The Loss of HMAS Sydney II. Canberra: Department of Defence. ISBN 978-0-642-29712-9. OCLC 432200965. Wikidata Q131411474. Archived from the original on 19 November 2021.
- Department of Veterans' Affairs (6 December 2024). "Foster, Norman Douglas". World War Two Service, Service Record, Department of Veterans' Affairs, Australian Government.
- Frame, Tom (1993). HMAS Sydney: Loss and Controversy. Rydalmere, NSW: Hodder & Stoughton. ISBN 0-340-58468-8. OCLC 32234178.
- Gee, Andrew (19 November 2021). "Unknown HMAS Sydney II sailor named after 80 years" (Media release). Department of Defence, Australian Government.
- Gilmore, Heath; Walker, Frank (24 June 2007). "HMAS Sydney's unknown sailor may be identified". Sydney Morning Herald.
- Joint Standing Committee on Foreign Affairs, Defence and Trade (JCFADT) (22 March 1999). Report on the Loss of HMAS Sydney. Canberra: The Parliament of the Commonwealth of Australia. ISBN 0-642-25872-4. OCLC 42768622. Archived from the original on 3 October 2009.
- Mearns, David (2009). The Search for the Sydney. Pymble, NSW: HarperCollins Publishers. ISBN 978-0-7322-8889-1. OCLC 301679923.
- Midena, Kate (19 November 2021). "Identity of 'unknown sailor' revealed as 21-year-old Thomas Welsby Clark". ABC News. Australian Broadcasting Corporation.
- "A6770, Foster N D". National Archives of Australia. 2024.
- Olson, Wes (2000). Bitter Victory: The Death of HMAS Sydney. Nedlands: UWA Publishing. ISBN 1-876268-49-2. LCCN 2001326189. OCLC 45722719. OL 3990396M. Wikidata Q131399419.
- Quekett, Malcolm (19 August 2019). "Navy researchers close to confirming WA sailor Norman Douglas Foster as unknown victim of HMAS Sydney sinking". West Australian.
- Swinden, Greg (2009). "The Long Journey Home: The Story of the Unknown HMAS Sydney Sailor" (PDF). Headmark: Journal of the Australian Naval Institute (132, June). Red Hill: Australian Naval Institute: 9-14. ISSN 1833-6531.
- Swinden, Greg (25 November 2021). "Able Seaman Thomas Welsby Clark". Royal Australian Navy.
- Winter, Barbara (1984). H. M. A. S. Sydney: Fact, Fantasy and Fraud. Brisbane: Boolarong Press. ISBN 0-908175-72-8. LCCN 84179353. OCLC 11783441. OL 2940872M. Wikidata Q131423643.
