= HMAS Waree =

Australian tug boat

Coordinates: 29°25.385′S 153°21.854′E

History

Australia
- Name: Waree
- Owner: Waratah Tug and Salvage Company
- Laid down: 4 July 1938
- Launched: 21 January 1939
- Completed: 12 April 1939

History

Australia
- Name: Waree
- Commissioned: 18 September 1942
- Fate: Sank on 17 October 1946

General characteristics
- Type: Tug boat
- Tonnage: 233 gross register tons
- Length: 95 ft (29 m)
- Beam: 25 ft (7.6 m)
- Draught: 13.4 ft (4.1 m)
- Depth: 11.3 ft (3.4 m)
- Installed power: 860 hp (640 kW)
- Propulsion: Single screw triple expansion steam engine
- Speed: 11.5
- Complement: 13
- Armament: 2 × .303-inch Vickers machine gun

HMAS Waree (W128) was a tug boat operated by the Royal Australian Navy (RAN) during World War II. She operated as a tug boat for the Waratah Tug and Salvage Company before being requisitioned by the RAN in 1942, and operating in northern Australia and Papua. She sank on 17 October 1946 off the New South Wales coast while sailing to Sydney from Thursday Island.

== Construction and design ==
Laid down on 4 July 1938, Waree was built by the Cockatoo Docks & Engineering Company at Cockatoo Island Dockyard in Sydney and launched on 21 January 1939 for the Waratah Tug Company. Construction was completed on 12 April 1939. Measuring 233 gross register tons, the ship was 95 ft (29 m) long and had a beam of 25 ft (7.6 m) and a draught of 13.4 ft (4.1 m). Powered by a single screw triple expansion steam engine producing 860 hp (640 kW), the ship was capable of steaming 11.5 kn (21.3 km/h; 13.2 mph) and had a crew of 13, including two officers. In RAN service, the ship was fitted with 2 × .303-inch Vickers machine guns for self-defence.

== Operational history and fate ==
Warree was requisitioned by the RAN on 4 September 1942 and after fitting out she was commissioned on 18 September 1942. She was sent to Port Moresby, Territory of Papua, where she served until 30 January 1945. She returned to Australia where she operated in the waters off North Queensland and the Northern Territory.

While steaming to Sydney from Thursday Island with cargo on 17 October 1946, Waree began taking on water and was run aground near the entrance of the Clarence River at Yamba, New South Wales. She was declared a total loss. All crew members were rescued after a long swim to shore. A court martial later found Waree's captain, Lieutenant Bill Boas, culpable for her loss.
