= List of Hobart tug boats =

This is a list of tugboats that service (either currently or previously) the River Derwent and surrounds.

Name	Year built	Builder	Initial ownership	Current ownership / Fate	Length	Beam	Bullard pull	Propulsion	Service years
Tawe (Gowang)			Royal Australian Army AT1555		15m	8m			1946
Boyer			Royal Australian Navy RNT104						
Cape Peron (Westamar)			Royal Australian Navy RNT104						
Tacoma (Maydeena (1))	1950	America		Converted to fishing boat					1950-
Swiftness (Temp. Plover)	1920	Fleming & Ferguson, Paisley, Scotland		Burnt and Scuttled Storm Bay, Tasmania 1979				Diesel	1959–1970s
Kallista				Belize	36m	8m			1963-
Maydeena (2)				Backspring Pty Ltd, Hobart				Diesel	-1986
Cape Forestier (Warang (1974)	1936	Cockatoo Docks & Engineering Company, Sydney	Waratah Tug & Salvage Company, Port Jackson					Diesel	1968–1987
Cape Bruny (Wonga (1949)	1949	Cockatoo Docks & Engineering Company, Sydney	Adelaide Steamship Company	Tamar River, Launceston				Diesel	1971–1988
York Syme	1961	Adelaide Ship Construction, Port Adelaide		Coastal D & C Limited	28.96 m	7.57m			1973-
Cape Raoul (Sirius Cove (1973))	1958	T Mitchison, Gateshead, England	J Fenwick & Co, Port Jackson	Bismark Marine, Port Moresby as Hercules	29.88m	7.93m			1973–1996
Storm Cove (Shell Cove (1986))	1971	Carrington Slipways, Newcastle		Bell Bay, Tasmania	30m	10m	25t	Duckpeller	1983
Risdon Cove (Expo 1998)	1993	Kying In Engineerting & Shipbuilding, Incheon, South Korea		Bell Bay	30m	8m	34t	Azimuthing Stern Drive	1998–13
Tarragal	1969	Adelaide Ship Construction, Port Adelaide		Sierra Fleet Services Bondi, New South Wales	28.59m	8.54m	25t		1991–2012
Keira	1973	Ballina Slipway & Engineering, Ballina			29m	10m			1991–2012
Swissco 168	1995	Tuong Aik Shipyard, Sibu, Malaysia		Dover	23.17m	6.7m			– present
Allgo Sharapova	2006	Yong Choo Kui Shipyard, Sibu, Malaysia		Backspring Pty Ltd, Hobart	21.77m	7.32m	12t		– present
Ocean Dynasty 138 (Ocranlec 201 (2008))	2008	Laju Kurnia Maju Shipyard, Miri, Malaysia		Offshore Unlimited	31.2m	9.15m	30t	Twin Kort Nozzles	2014–present
Pacific Crest (Breyjay (2007), Cape Horn II (2007))	2007	Berjaya Dockyard, Miri, Malaysia		Offshore Unlimited	30.2m	8.6m	30t	Twin Kort Nozzles	2014–present
Farm Cove (Reef Cove 1977)	1971	NQEA, Cairns		Backspring Pty Ltd, Hobart	29m	10m	30t		1987–2016
Sydney Cove (Barrier Cove 1977)	1971	NQEA, Cairns			29m	10m			1987–2016
Watagan (Shell Cove 1996)	1986	NQEA, Cairns		Burnie	20m	12m	47t	Azimuthing Stern Drive	2013–2016
Wilga	1991	Ocean Shipyard WA, Fremantle		Devonport	32m	12m	50t	Azimuthing Stern Drive	2016–2017
Godley	1977	Sims Engineering, Port Chalmers, Dunedin New Zealand	Lyttelton Port Company, NZ	Port of Hobart	28.73m	9.73m	25t	Azimuthing Stern Drive	2003–present
Mount Florance	2007	Cheoy Shipyards, Hong Kong		Port of Hobart	27.4m	11.5m	57.4t	Azimuthing Stern Drive	2018–present
Yandeyarra	2008	Cheoy Shipyards, Hong Kong		Port of Hobart	27.4m	11.5m	64.8t	Azimuthing Stern Drive	2018–present
