= Makri Yalo Airbase =

Former airbase on Scarpanto, Dodecanese

Coordinates: 35°35′N 27°08′E

The Makri Yalo airbase was a Regia Aeronautica (Italian Royal Air Force) facility on the island of Scarpanto, in the Dodecanese.

During World War II, the airbase was a major part of Italian military operations in the Mediterranean, by supporting air operations to Crete, the Greek mainland, and the ocean approaches to Egypt.

In September 1940, the base was shelled by the Australian light cruiser HMAS Sydney and the British destroyer HMS Ilex.
