= HMAS St Giles =

Former tugboat

History

United Kingdom
- Owner: Royal Navy (1919–1921)
- Builder: Ferguson Shipbuilders, Glasgow
- Yard number: 244
- Launched: 14 May 1919

Australia
- Name: St Giles
- Owner: J. & A. Brown; Waratah Tug and Salvage Company
- Fate: Scrapped in 1957

Australia
- Name: St Giles
- Owner: Royal Australian Navy (1939–1942), (1945-1947)
- Fate: Returned to owners in 1947

General characteristics
- Class & type: Rescue/Saint class ocean tug
- Type: Tugboat
- Tonnage: 380 gross register tons
- Length: 135.4 ft (41.3 m)
- Beam: 29 ft (8.8 m)
- Installed power: 208 hp (155 kW) (nominal)
- Propulsion: Triple expansion engine
- Speed: 12.5 knots (23.2 km/h; 14.4 mph)

HMAS St Giles (FY86) was a tugboat which was operated by the Royal Navy (RN), Royal Australian Navy (RAN) and the Australian shipping firms J. & A. Brown and the Waratah Tug and Salvage Company. She was built by Ferguson Shipbuilders, Glasgow for the RN in 1919, was sold to J. & A. Brown in 1925, transferred to the Waratah Tug and Salvage Co Pty Ltd in 1931 and was commissioned into the RAN between 1940 and 1942 and 1945 and 1946 before being scrapped in 1956.

== Operational history ==
The ship was built for the RN as the Rescue/Saint class ocean tug St Giles. She entered service in 1919 and was sold to J. & A. Brown, Newcastle in 1922. She was sold in 1931 to the Waratah Tug and Salvage Co Pty Ltd, Sydney.

Following the outbreak of World War II, St Giles was requisitioned by the RAN in 1939. She was later converted to an auxiliary anti-submarine vessel and commissioned on 15 January 1940. She was decommissioned in May 1942.

St Giles was recommissioned on 23 August 1945. During her second commission she was used as a tugboat in Australian and New Guinea waters. She was paid off from the RAN in March 1946 and returned to her owners in 1947. She continued in commercial service until she was sold for scrap and broken up in 1956.
