= Carley float =

Liferaft design

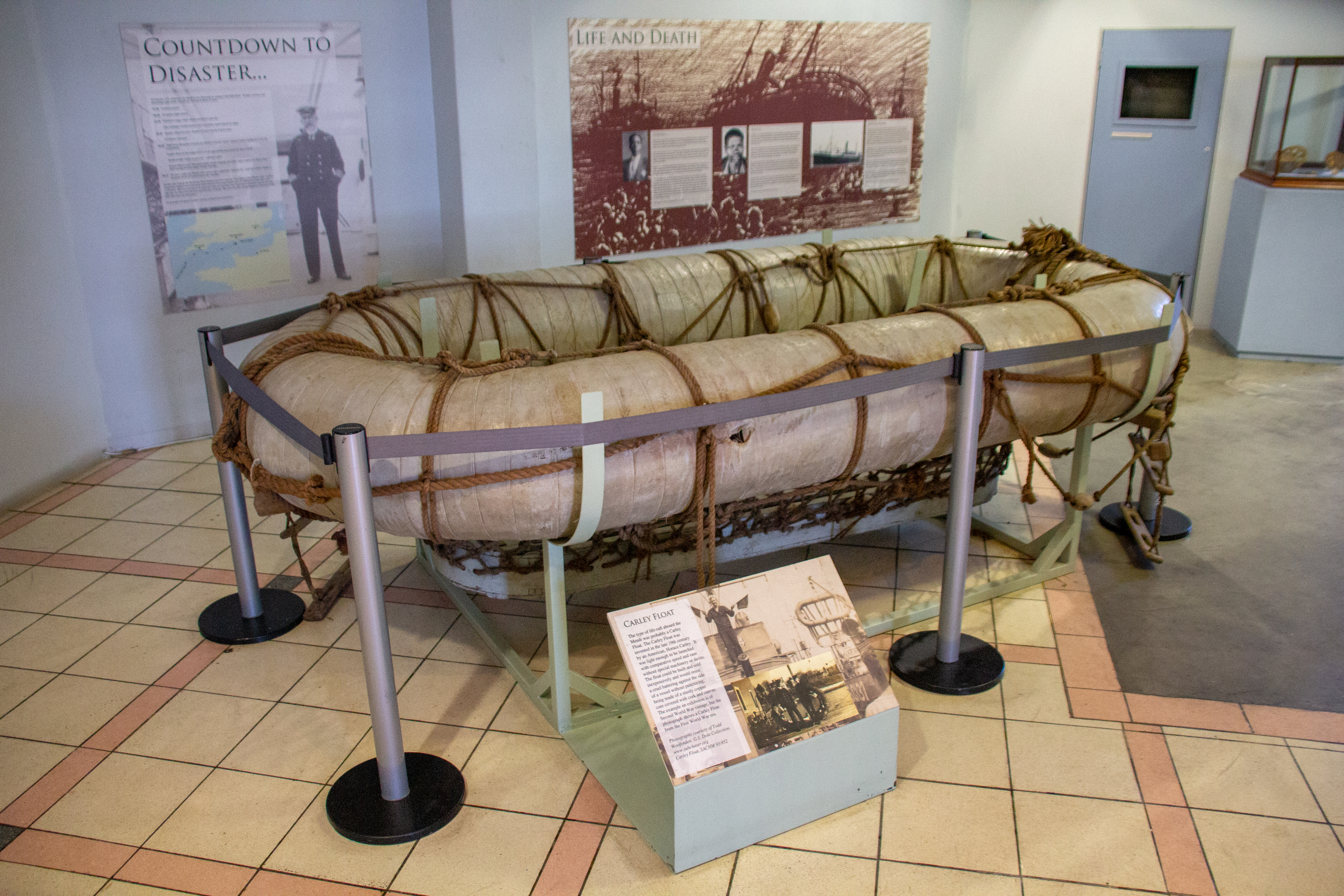
A Carley float

The Carley float (sometimes Carley raft) was a form of invertible liferaft designed by American inventor Horace Carley (1838–1918). Supplied mainly to warships, it saw widespread use in a number of navies during peacetime and both World Wars until superseded by more modern rigid or inflatable designs. Carley was awarded a patent in 1903 after establishing the Carley Life Float Company of Philadelphia.

== Description ==
A Carley float cross-section

The Carley float was formed from a length of copper or steel tubing 12–20 inches (30–50 cm) in diameter bent into an oval ring. The ring was surrounded by a buoyant mass of kapok or cork, and then covered with a layer of canvas rendered waterproof via painting or doping. The metal tube was divided into waterproof compartments with vertical baffles. The raft was thus rigid, and could remain buoyant, floating equally well with either side uppermost, even if the waterproof outer was punctured.

The floor of the raft was made from wood slats or a webbing grid. Boxes containing paddles, water, rations and survival equipment were lashed to the floor grid. Men could either sit around the rim of the raft, or, if in the water, cling to rope loops strung around its edge. The largest model could accommodate up to fifty men, half inside the raft, and the others in the water holding onto the ropes.

Not all Carley float tubing had a round outer cross section. Some had square cross sections. And those with square cross-section may have been exclusively associated with a square-shaped boat perimeter, similar to a punt.

Some variants included a calcium flare that would automatically ignite on immersion in water. The flare could however expose a raft to hostile fire, as then-Lt. Stuart Bonham Carter found during the 1918 Zeebrugge Raid as he escaped the scuttled blockship HMS Intrepid. Only the smoke of the burning vessel behind him prevented him from being targeted.

== Operation ==
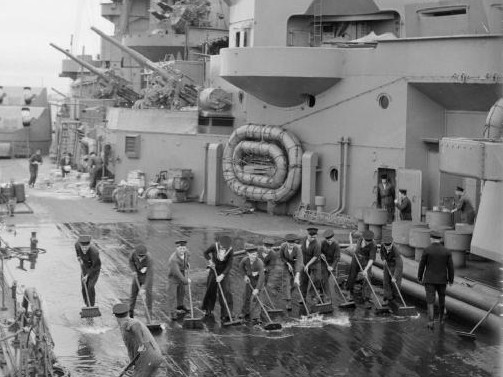
Nested Carley floats visible on the wall on HMS Rodney

Simply by casting it over the side, the lightweight Carley float could be launched more rapidly than traditional rigid lifeboat designs, and without the need for specialised hoists. It could be mounted on any convenient surface and survive the battering against the ship's sides during heavy seas. Unlike the rubber inflatable rafts of the period, it was relatively immune to compromise of its buoyant chambers.

Seafarers in it were completely exposed to the elements, and would suffer accordingly. A 1946 inquiry reported that many sailors who had succeeded in getting to the safety of Carley floats had nevertheless succumbed to exposure before rescue could be made. The crew of the Canadian minesweeper HMCS Esquimalt, sunk offshore of Nova Scotia in April 1945, lost at least 16 to hypothermia during the six hours in which they awaited rescue. Few of the survivors could still walk.

Despite these shortcomings many seamen owed their lives to the Carley float. Chinese sailor Poon Lim survived for a record 133 days adrift in the South Atlantic aboard a Carley float after his freighter SS Benlomond was sunk on 23 November 1942. He fashioned fishing gear from components of the raft. He was close to death when discovered off the coast of Brazil on 5 April 1943, but was able to walk ashore unaided.

A shrapnel-ridden Carley float carried the body of an unknown man to land on Christmas Island in February 1942. The sun-bleached corpse had evidently spent a lengthy period at sea, and was long suspected to have come from HMAS Sydney, which was lost with all hands under mysterious circumstances off the coast of Australia on 19 November 1941. On the eightieth anniversary of the sinking, the Australian Department of Defence announced DNA testing had shown the body to be that of Able Seaman Thomas Welsby Clark, a sailor who had been lost with Sydney. A second Carley float, also believed to be from Sydney, was recovered drifting 300 km off the Australian coast one week after the ship sank. It had been badly damaged by shellfire, but was empty. The float is now displayed at the HMAS Sydney exhibit of the Australian War Memorial, Canberra.

== In fiction ==
External image
- Scene from In Which We Serve

The 1942 British war film In Which We Serve centres on a group of survivors clinging to a Carley float. As they suffer from the elements and repeated strafing attacks, the story of how they each came to be there is told through a series of flashbacks.

In Nicholas Monsarrat's 1951 novel The Cruel Sea, the survivors of the fictional Royal Navy corvette Compass Rose gather on a pair of Carley floats after the ship is torpedoed south of Iceland. The ship has sunk so fast that nothing else is available. The men on one float are led through the night by Commander Ericson, the second by first officer Lockhart. 11 men survive from a crew of 88 before they are rescued by a RN destroyer the next morning. This is also portrayed in the 1953 film of the same title.

In the 1964 film Ensign Pulver, after an altercation on deck during a storm, the captain (played by Burl Ives) falls overboard in an apparent state of shock. The title character Ensign Pulver (Robert Walker), upon finding the captain cannot swim, releases a nearby Carley float as a life preserver. The captain in his state can't swim to the boat, so Ensign Pulver jumps in and pulls the captain onto the liferaft. The two spend some time in the raft together before washing up on an island.

In the 2016 film USS Indianapolis: Men of Courage the crew are stranded in South Pacific clinging to square-shaped Carley floats.
