= HMAS Sydney (D48) =

Modified Leander-class cruiser of the Australian Navy

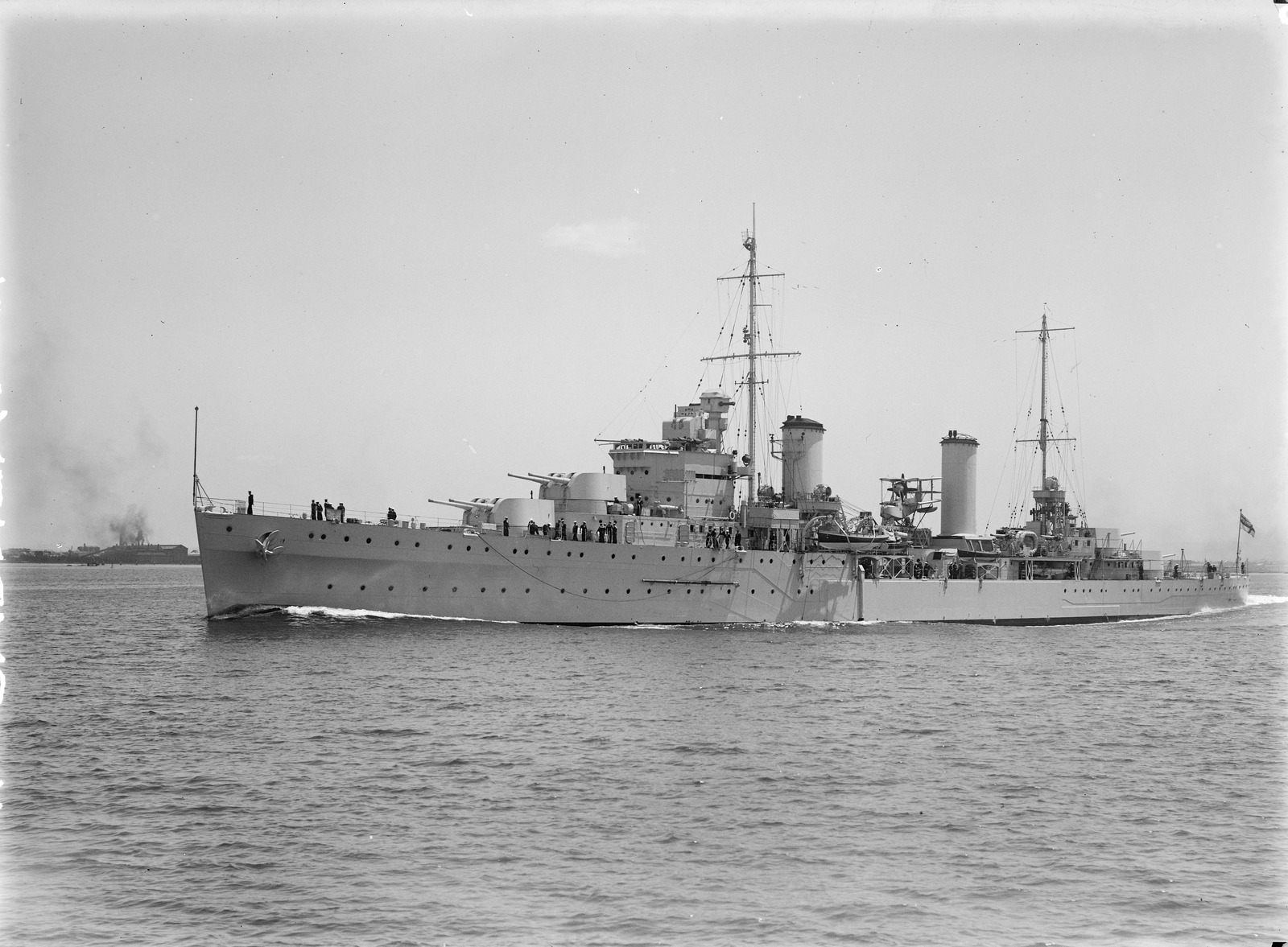
- HMAS Sydney in 1936

History

Australia
- Name: Sydney
- Namesake: Sydney, Australia
- Builder: Swan Hunter & Wigham Richardson, Wallsend-on-Tyne, England
- Laid down: 8 July 1933
- Launched: 22 September 1934
- Christened: HMS Phaeton
- Commissioned: 24 September 1935
- Identification: Pennant number: I48/D48
- Motto: "I Take But I Surrender"
- Nickname(s): "Stormy Petrel"; "Grey Gladiator"
- Honours and awards: Battle honours: Calabria 1940; Spada 1940; Mediterranean 1940; Kormoran 1941; plus three inherited honours
- Fate: Sunk in battle with all hands lost, 19 November 1941
- Notes: Wreck rediscovered in 2008; Thomas Welsby Clark identified in 2021 as person found in 1942 at Christmas Island

General characteristics (as built)
- Class & type: Modified Leander-class light cruiser
- Displacement: 6,701 tons (light); 7,198 tons (standard); 8,940 tons (full load)
- Length: 562 ft 4 in (171.40 m) (overall); 530 ft (160 m) (between perpendiculars)
- Beam: 56 ft 8.5 in (17.285 m)
- Draught: 15 ft 3 in (4.65 m) forward; 17 ft 3 in (5.26 m) aft
- Installed power: 72,000 shaft horsepower (54,000 kW)
- Propulsion: 4 Admiralty 3-drum boilers, Parsons geared turbines, 4 shafts
- Speed: 32.5 knots (60.2 km/h; 37.4 mph)
- Range: 7,000 nautical miles (13,000 km; 8,100 mi) at 16 knots (30 km/h; 18 mph)
- Complement: 33 officers, 557 sailors, 4 RAAF (at commissioning); 41 officers, 594 sailors, 6 RAAF, 4 civilian canteen staff (at loss)
- Sensors & processing systems: Type 125
- Armament: 8 × 6-inch (150 mm) breech-loading Mk XXIII guns (4 × Mk XXI twin turrets); 4 × 4-inch (100 mm) quick firing Mk V guns (4 × Mk IV single high-angle mountings); 12 × 0.5-inch (13 mm) Vickers Mk III machine guns (3 × Mk II quadruple mountings); 14 × 0.303-inch (7.7 mm) Lewis machine guns (reduced to 9 before 1939); 2 × 0.303-inch (7.7 mm) Vickers machine guns (removed before 1939); 8 × 21 inch (533 mm) deck-mounted torpedo tubes (2 × QR Mk VII quadruple mountings, 8 × Mk 9 torpedoes); 4 × 3-pounder (47-mm, 1.9-in) Hotchkiss quick-firing saluting guns (removed in 1940)
- Armour: 1-inch (25 mm) hull plating; 3-inch (76 mm) belt over machinery spaces; 2-inch (51 mm) belt over magazines and shell rooms
- Aircraft carried: 1 × Supermarine Walrus
- Aviation facilities: 1 × revolving catapult amidships

HMAS Sydney, named for the Australian city of Sydney, was one of three modified Leander-class light cruisers operated by the Royal Australian Navy (RAN). Ordered for the Royal Navy as HMS Phaeton, the cruiser was purchased by the Australian government and renamed prior to her 1934 launch.

During the early part of her operational history, Sydney helped enforce sanctions during the Abyssinian Crisis, and at the start of World War II was assigned to convoy escort and patrol duties in Australian waters. In May 1940, Sydney joined the British Mediterranean Fleet for an eight-month deployment, during which she sank two Italian warships, participated in multiple shore bombardments, and provided support to the Malta Convoys, while receiving minimal damage and no casualties. On her return to Australia in February 1941, Sydney resumed convoy escort and patrol duties in home waters.

On 19 November 1941, Sydney was involved in a mutually destructive engagement with the German auxiliary cruiser Kormoran, and was lost with all hands (645 aboard). The wrecks of both ships were lost until 2008; Sydney was found on 17 March, four days after her adversary. Sydney's defeat is commonly attributed to the proximity of the two ships during the engagement, and Kormoran's advantages of surprise and rapid, accurate fire. However, the cruiser's loss with all hands compared to the survival of most of the Germans has resulted in conspiracy theories alleging that the German commander used illegal ruses to lure Sydney into range, that a Japanese submarine was involved, and that the true events of the battle are concealed behind a wide-ranging cover-up, despite the lack of evidence for these allegations.

== Construction and acquisition ==
The ship was laid down by Swan Hunter & Wigham Richardson at Wallsend-on-Tyne, England, on 8 July 1933 for the Royal Navy as HMS Phaeton, named after the Greek mythological figure. However, in 1934, the Australian government was seeking a replacement for the light cruiser HMAS Brisbane, and negotiated to purchase Phaeton while she was still under construction.

The cruiser was renamed after the capital city of New South Wales, and was launched on 22 September 1934 by Ethel Bruce, the wife of Stanley Bruce, former prime minister of Australia and the serving Australian High Commissioner to the United Kingdom. Sydney was commissioned into the RAN on 24 September 1935, drawing her ship's company from Brisbane, which had been decommissioned earlier that day.

Following the announcement that Australia was purchasing a British-built cruiser, there was criticism, primarily from the Opposition of the day, stating that such a warship should be built using Australian resources and labour. Several reasons were given in reply for acquiring British-built cruisers instead of Australian-made: the ship was already close to completion, the threat of war meant that there was not enough time to train Australians in the necessary shipbuilding skills, and that of the two cruisers built in Australian shipyards, one (HMAS Adelaide) had taken seven years to complete.

== Design ==
Sydney was one of three Modified Leander-class light cruisers acquired by the RAN during the late 1930s. Although the first ship of the class to join the RAN, Sydney was the second ship to be laid down, although the first to be completed, in what was sometimes referred to as the Perth class: Perth and Hobart operated with the Royal Navy for a short period before they were purchased by Australia in 1938. Like most British cruisers, the Leanders were designed for long-range patrols, scouting, and trade protection duties.

Sydney's displacement ranged between 6,701 tons (light) and 8,940 tons (full load), with a standard displacement of 7,198 tons: improved fabrication and welding techniques made her 52 tons lighter than her sister ships. She had a length of 530 feet (160 m) between perpendiculars and 562 feet 4 inches (171.40 m) overall, (Note: Several sources give the cruiser's overall length as 555 feet (169 m): this value is for the unmodified Leander-class cruisers.) a beam of 56 feet 8.5 inches (17.285 m), and a draught at standard displacement between 15 feet 3 inches (4.65 m) forward and 17 feet 3 inches (5.26 m) aft.

The ship was propelled by four Admiralty 3-drum boilers, feeding Parsons single-reduction geared turbines, which supplied 72,000 shaft horsepower (54,000 kW) to the four propeller shafts. Unlike the first five Leanders, which had their machinery arranged on the "in-line" principle (consisting of six boilers in three compartments forward, and four turbines in two further compartments aft), Sydney was designed with two redundant machinery groups, a design practice adopted from the United States Navy. The cruiser had two boilers and the turbines for the outer shafts forward, and two boilers and the turbines for the inner shafts aft; as steam from any boiler could be routed to any turbine, the ship could continue operating if one space was damaged.

Each space had its own uptake, giving the modified ships a different profile to the single-funnelled early Leanders; an arrangement which contributed to naval historian Henry Lenton's description of the Modified Leanders as "the most handsome cruisers ever built by the Royal Navy, with a symmetry that was as attractive as it was functional."

Sydney and her sister ships were constructed from 1-inch (25 mm) hull plating, with a 3-inch (76 mm) armour belt over the machinery spaces (the lengthening of this belt from 84 to 141 feet (26 to 43 m) to adequately cover both spaces negated the weight reduction from their reorganisation), and 2-inch (51 mm) plates over the shell rooms and magazines. Sydney was the first Australian warship fitted with asdic; a Type 125 unit in a retractable pattern 3069 dome. The retractable sonar dome, located near the bow, was a weak point in the hull.

One of the cruiser's early commanding officers, Royal Navy Captain J.W.A. Waller, believed that the ship's single director control tower was a weak point in the design. The director control tower was the highest compartment on the ship, from where personnel would determine the range and optimum firing angle for a gun salvo, then transmit this information to the gun turrets: the actual firing could be controlled from the tower or the turret. Waller believed that the centralised system could be destroyed with a single hit, or the wiring linking the compartment to the turrets could be severed, forcing the four turrets to rely on independent control. Although Waller suggested that a second tower be installed aft to provide redundancy, it was deferred indefinitely as subsequent commanding officers did not share his concerns, and combat experiences of other Leander-class cruisers showed that the system was more robust than expected.

=== Armament ===
Sydney's main armament consisted of eight 6-inch (152 mm) breech-loading Mk XXIII guns mounted in four Mk XXI twin turrets: "A" and "B" forward, "X" and "Y" aft. All eight guns could be fired in salvo, elevated to an angle of 60° and depressed to −5°, and fire eight rounds a minute at targets up to 24,800 yards (22,700 m) away.

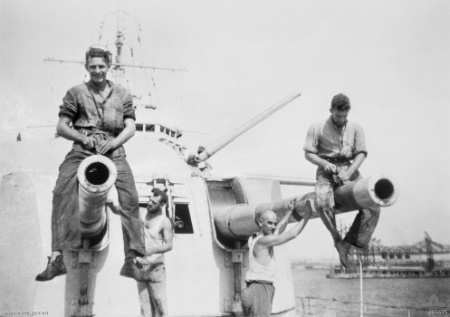
Sailors working on the 6-inch (150 mm) diameter barrels of "A" turret, following the Battle of Cape Spada in 1940

Four 4-inch (100 mm) quick-firing Mk V guns, mounted on single, high-angle, Mk IV mountings, were fitted to a platform around the aft funnel. These were primarily used to target aircraft at heights up to 28,750 feet (8,760 m), but could also be used against surface targets, with a maximum range of 16,300 yards (14,900 m). Their replacement with eight Mk XIX high-angle/low-angle guns in four twin mounts, which was to occur in the late 1930s, was prevented by the outbreak of World War II. The guns could have been swapped out during a maintenance docking, but the demand for cruisers and Sydney's fortune in never sustaining major damage meant that the additional time in dock could not be justified. For close-range anti-aircraft defence, the 4-inch guns were supplemented by twelve 0.5-inch (13 mm) Vickers Mk III machine guns, which were arranged in three Mk II quadruple mountings, one on each side of the forward superstructure, and the third on top of the aft superstructure.

A mixture of 0.303-inch (7.7 mm) machine guns were used for close defence work, and could be fitted to pedestals at various points on the ship, primarily around the bridge and on the three searchlight platforms (one either side of the forward funnel, the third raised above the aft superstructure). At launch, Sydney carried fourteen Lewis machine guns and two Vickers machine guns, but by the start of World War II, the Lewis guns had been reduced to nine, and the Vickers guns removed completely.

Eight 21-inch (533 mm) torpedo tubes were fitted in two QR Mk VII quadruple mounts to the deck below the platform for the 4-inch guns. Only eight Mark 9 torpedoes were carried. Sydney was fitted with a single depth charge rail at the stern, which held five Mk VII depth charges. Four 3-pounder (47-mm, 1.9-in) quick-firing Hotchkiss guns were carried as saluting guns. These were removed during the August 1940 refit.

Sydney was fitted with a 53-foot (16 m), cordite-powered revolving catapult between the two funnels, which was used to launch a Supermarine Walrus (sometimes described as a Seagull V) amphibious aircraft. The Walrus was operated by Royal Australian Air Force personnel from No. 5 Squadron RAAF (which was redesignated No. 9 Squadron RAAF in 1939). The 7-ton electric crane used to recover the aircraft also served to deploy most of the ship's boats.

== Operational history ==
=== Early history ===
Sydney completed working up trials before sailing from Portsmouth on 29 October 1935, Captain J.U.P. Fitzgerald RN in command. Almost immediately after departing, Sydney was instructed to join the Royal Navy's Mediterranean Fleet at Gibraltar and assist the 2nd Cruiser Squadron in enforcing economic sanctions against Italy in response to the Abyssinian crisis. During January 1936, the cruiser underwent maintenance in Alexandria and visited medical facilities in Cyprus: cases of rubella and mumps had been circulating through the ship's company since late 1935. In March, Sydney was reassigned the 1st Cruiser Squadron, where she and the heavy cruiser HMAS Australia continued to enforce sanctions and participate in fleet exercises with Royal Navy units. Following the resolution of the Abyssinian crisis, Sydney departed for Australia on 14 July; reaching Fremantle in late July before visiting Melbourne on 8 August and arriving in her namesake city three days later.

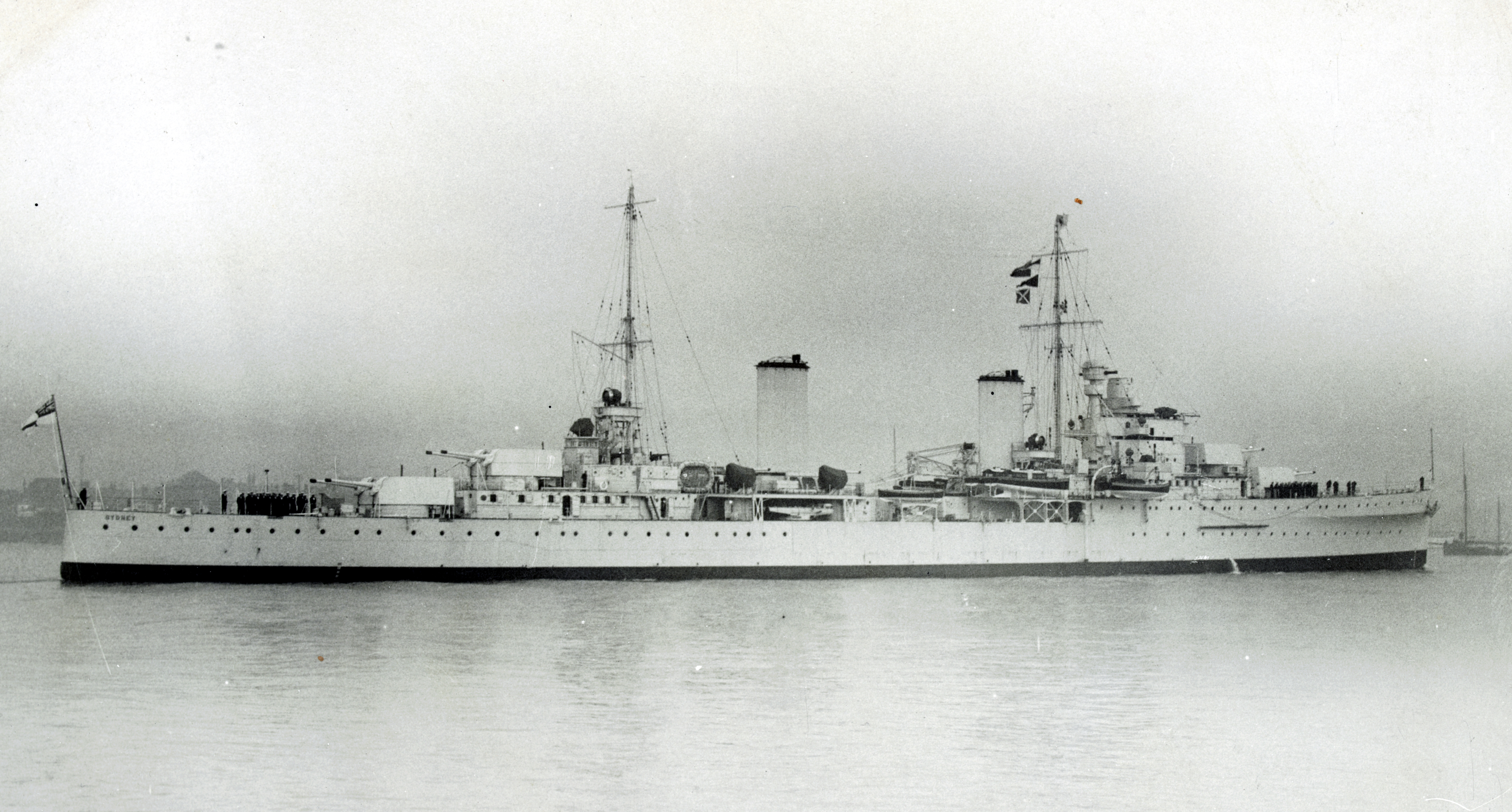
Sydney, circa 1935

After reaching Australian waters, Sydney spent most of her time on fleet exercises and training cruises. In 1938, the cruiser was one of several RAN units prepared to respond to the Munich crisis, but all ships stood down after the potential war was averted. From 17 to 19 April 1939, Sydney was one of eight warships involved in a joint forces trade protection exercise off the south-east Australian coast. In early August 1939, Sydney was in Darwin, prior to visiting the Netherlands East Indies. However, in response to the events which prompted the start of World War II, Sydney was ordered to sail to Fremantle on a war footing, where she arrived on 22 August.

=== Start of World War II ===
Following the declaration of war, Sydney was instructed to carry out patrol and escort duties in Australian waters. Captain John Collins took over command of Sydney on 16 November. On 28 November, Sydney joined the Australian heavy cruisers Australia and Canberra in an unsuccessful four-day search for the German pocket battleship Admiral Graf Spee, which was known to be operating in the Indian Ocean. Sydney was relieved by HMAS Adelaide on 13 December, and sailed to Cockatoo Island Dockyard in Sydney for a maintenance docking. The work was completed in late January 1940, and as a shakedown cruise Sydney joined Canberra and the British ships Leander and Ramillies in escorting the Suez-bound Anzac convoy US 1; Sydney broke off after the convoy left the east coast of Australia and returned to Sydney. Returning to Fremantle on 6 February, Sydney relieved Australia as the cruiser responsible for patrol and escort duties on the west coast.

On 19 April, Sydney joined the escort of Anzac convoy US 2 off Albany, and remained with the convoy until it reached the Cocos Islands on 28 April and was replaced by French cruiser Suffren. The Australian cruiser set course for Fremantle, but on 1 May was assigned to the East Indies Station and rerouted to Colombo, where she arrived on 8 May. Arriving in Colombo on 8 May, Sydney was immediately tasked with meeting Anzac convoy US 3 off the Cocos Islands and escorting it across the Indian Ocean. The cruiser departed on 12 May, but while en route, she was instructed to make for the Mediterranean.

Arriving back in Colombo on 18 May, Sydney replenished before sailing at high speed to Aden, where she arrived four days later. The Australian cruiser, accompanied by HM Ships Gloucester and Eagle, departed the next day, with the ships crossing the Suez Canal during the night of 25–26 May, and arriving in Alexandria that afternoon at 15:30. Sydney was originally marked for operations in the Red Sea, but after observing the performance of an Australian five-destroyer flotilla assigned to the British Mediterranean Fleet, Admiral Andrew Cunningham decided to "keep the Australian cruiser for himself" and attached Sydney to the Royal Navy's 7th Cruiser Squadron.

=== Mediterranean operations ===
Sydney was in Alexandria harbour on 10 June 1940, and that evening learned of Italy's intention to declare war at midnight. By 01:00 on 11 June, all ships in harbour had departed to search for Italian warships in position to attack Alexandria, and secure the sea lines of communication in the eastern Mediterranean and Aegean. The Australian cruiser was involved in the westbound sweep, and sailed as far as the Gulf of Taranto during the four-day operation. Apart from an unsuccessful depth charge attack on a suspected submarine during the afternoon of 13 June, Sydney did not encounter any enemy vessels.

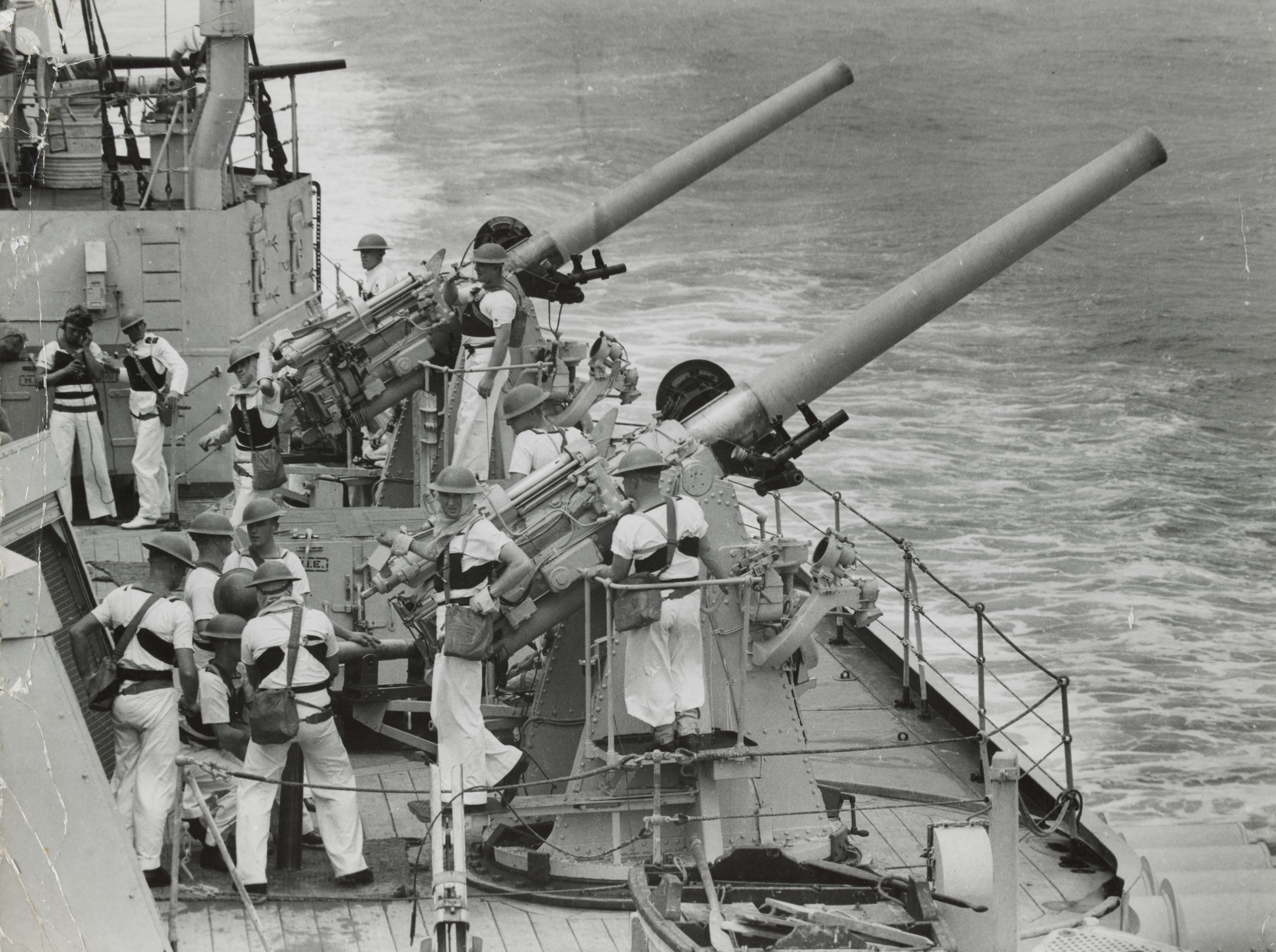
4-inch guns on HMAS Sydney

On 21 June, Sydney fired in anger for the first time, joining the British cruisers Orion and Neptune, the French battleship Lorraine, and a force of destroyers in shelling the Italian-controlled Libyan port of Bardia. Sydney focused her fire on a military camp throughout the twenty-two-minute bombardment. During this operation, the Australian ship's Walrus amphibian performed bombardment spotting for the squadron, but was fired on by three biplanes: although reported at the time as Italian Fiat CR.42 Falcos, the attackers were later determined to be British Gloster Gladiators. The pilot flew the damaged aircraft to Mersa Matruh, and was awarded the Distinguished Flying Cross for his skill in doing so, but the unrepairable Walrus was the only casualty of the operation. The next day, a retaliatory airstrike against the ships, by then having returned to Alexandria, failed to do damage.

That same day, Germany and Vichy France signed the Second Armistice at Compiègne: although French warships (which had until that point operated with the Allies) were ordered to return to France and disarm, the British government was unwilling to allow them to fall into Axis hands. Sydney and the British warships in Alexandria turned their guns on the French, but unlike the situation in Mers-el-Kébir, which deteriorated into a naval battle, British Admiral Cunningham and French Admiral René-Emile Godfroy peacefully negotiated to disarm the ships at Alexandria.

Sydney and other elements of the 7th Squadron sailed from Alexandria on 27 June, escorting a Malta convoy. Late on 28 June, the ships engaged a force of three Italian destroyers carrying out a ressuply mission to Tobruk. Although two Italian vessels were able to continue their way, the third, Espero was disabled. At 20:00, Sydney (which had little opportunity to fire during the engagement) was detailed to recover any survivors and sink the destroyer while the rest of the force continued on to Malta. However, while 6,000 yards (5,500 m) from Espero, the Italian ship fired two shells, both of which fell in line with but short of the cruiser. Sydney opened fire, and after four salvos struck the destroyer with no shots fired in return, resumed the approach. Espero sank at 20:35, and Sydney remained in the area for almost two hours to collect survivors despite the risk of submarine attack, before she was ordered to withdraw to Alexandria. The cruiser rescued 47 Italians (three of whom died from wounds during the return voyage), and left a fully provisioned cutter in the water to be used by other Italian survivors after Sydney had departed.

On the evening of 7 July, Sydney departed from Alexandria as part of a fleet including four other light cruisers, three battleships, an aircraft carrier, and sixteen destroyers, divided into three groups. The three groups were to rendezvous on 9 July at a point 120 nautical miles (220 km; 140 mi) east of Cape Passero and 150 nautical miles (280 km; 170 mi) from Malta, at which point the destroyers would escort two convoys outbound from Malta, while the other vessels would attack targets of opportunity around Sicily. However, early on 8 June, the British submarine HMS Phoenix reported that she had unsuccessfully attacked an Italian fleet including two battleships. Throughout the day, the fleet had to defend itself from multiple Italian air raids: at one point Sydney and the other cruisers of the 7th Squadron attacked what they thought was a high-flying bomber, but was later determined to be the planet Venus. Aerial reconnaissance located the Italian force during the afternoon, which was made up of at least two battleships, accompanied by multiple cruisers and destroyers. The sightings of such a large force of warships, combined with the heavy air attack, led Admiral Andrew Cunningham to conclude that the Italians were also covering a major convoy, and decide to reposition his fleet between the Italians and Taranto, the projected destination.

Contact with the Italian fleet was lost during the night, but regained in the morning of 9 July. By 14:00, the Allied fleet had positioned itself in the Italians' path, and Cunningham ordered them west, to close on the projected position of the enemy and engage. Sydney spotted smoke at 14:45, and made visual contact with a force of five cruisers just after 15:00. The Allied cruiser squadron, supported by the battleship HMS Warspite altered their course northward, and at 15:20, Sydney opened fire on an Italian Zara-class cruiser, 23,000 yards (21,000 m) distant, but both the Allied and Italian cruiser forces were unable to successfully hit their opposing numbers. Sydney remained unsuccessful until the late part of the engagement, when she successfully shelled a smokescreen-laying destroyer. The naval component of what came to be known as the Battle of Calabria concluded around 17:00, with Cunningham unwilling to pursue the Italian fleet through the smokescreen they had created. The Allied ships instead broke off for Malta, while enduring several heavy but ineffective air attacks; during the safe delivery of Malta Convoy MA 5 and the return to Alexandria on 13 July, Sydney sustained no damage, but expended all her anti-aircraft ammunition. Sydney's participation in the battle earned the ship a battle honour: "Calabria 1940".

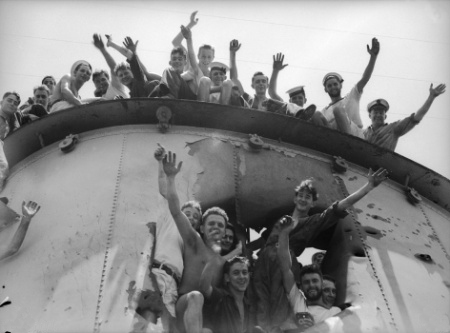
Sailors from Sydney posing around and in the forward funnel shellhole. This was the only damage received by the Australian cruiser during the battle of Cape Spada.

The Australian cruiser spent five days in Alexandria for resupply and maintenance, before departing for Crete with the British destroyer HMS Havock. They arrived at sunset on 18 July, and the next morning, the two ships were ordered to patrol the Gulf of Athens for Axis warships and shipping, while providing support for a four-ship destroyer force (HM Ships Hyperion, Ilex, Hero, and Hasty) conducting an anti-submarine sweep north of Crete. Believing that these two tasks were incompatible, and that protecting the destroyers was the more important, Sydney's commander, Captain John Collins, ordered the two ships to move 100 nautical miles (190 km; 120 mi) south of their patrol area while maintaining radio silence. At 07:20 on 19 July, the destroyer force spotted and was spotted by a pair of Italian light cruisers; Giovanni dalle Bande Nere and Bartolomeo Colleoni, which opened fire seven minutes later. The British destroyers turned to a north-east heading and set off at 30 knots (56 km/h; 35 mph), broadcasting news of the attack to the silent Sydney while closing the gap between the two forces. Using the wireless signals to track the four destroyers, Sydney and Havock made to intercept the destroyers and their cruiser pursuit, and was able to close at least half an hour earlier than if they had followed their original instructions: when Sydney opened fire on Bande Nere at 08:29, both sides were surprised by the appearance of the cruiser. Within minutes, Sydney had successfully damaged Bande Nere, and when the Italians withdrew to the south, the six Allied ships pursued. At 08:48, with Bande Nere hiding behind a smoke screen, Sydney shifted her fire to Bartolomeo Colleoni, which was disabled by 09:33. Collins ordered the destroyers to torpedo the ship and rescue survivors: Hyperion, Ilex, and Havock did so, while Hero and Hasty supported Sydney in continuing pursuit of Bande Nere. At 10:37, the chase ended, as the faster Italian cruiser had outrun the Allies, visibility was reduced by smoke and haze, and ammunition aboard the pursuing ships was low: Sydney had ten shells left for her forward turrets. The six ships returned to Alexandria around 11:00 on 20 July after fending off several air attacks (one of which damaged Havock), and were met by cheering from all ships in the harbour.

The only damage to Sydney during what came to be known as the Battle of Cape Spada was caused by a shell at 09:21, which knocked a hole in the forward funnel, and wounded a sailor through splinter damage. For his actions, Collins was appointed a Companion of the Order of the Bath, while other officers and sailors from Sydney received two Distinguished Service Orders, two Distinguished Service Crosses, five Distinguished Service Medals, and twelve Mentions in Despatches between them. Sydney herself was awarded the battle honour "Spada 1940".

After refuelling and rearming, Sydney and HMS Neptune departed Alexandria on 27 July to join the covering force for a southbound convoy from the Aegean. The ships were attacked five times that afternoon by aircraft, but Sydney escaped with only minor damage and shrapnel wounds. The two cruisers broke away from the convoy the next day to locate and sink the Greek tanker Ermioni, which was supplying the Italian-held Dodecanese Islands. The two cruisers located Ermioni just before dusk: Sydney provided anti-submarine protection while the tanker's crew were convinced to transfer to the British warships, after which Ermioni was shelled by Neptune. The two ships returned to Alexandria on 30 July, and Sydney departed the same day in company with HMS Orion for a three-day patrol.

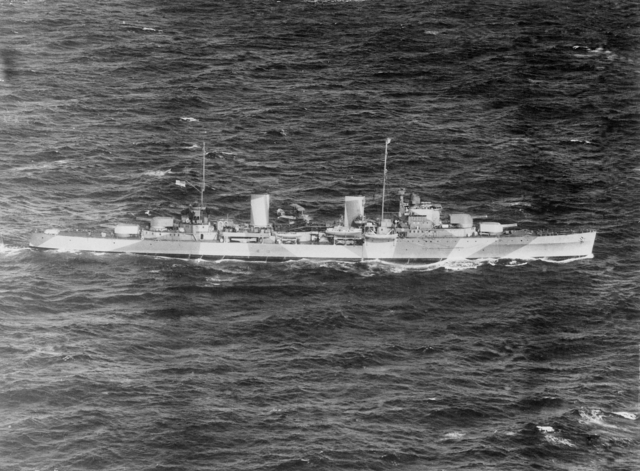
Sydney underway in August 1941. The ship's first camouflage pattern can be seen on the starboard flank. Shortly after this photograph was taken, the camouflage pattern was changed.

Back in Alexandria, Sydney underwent a refit, during which a 3-foot (0.91 m) high, 0.5-inch (13 mm) thick wall of armour plating was constructed around the 4-inch gun platform, while the ship's company repainted the ship from standard grey to a naval camouflage pattern. The refit was completed by 12 August, when Sydney, Neptune, and five destroyers set off to interdict Axis shipping along the north African coast and the Aegean Sea. The operation was cancelled after no ships were located during the first two days, and Sydney was tasked with assisting a destroyer squadron during shore bombardments at Bomba and Bardia. At the end of the month, the cruiser joined the escort of Malta convoy MB 5.

On the return voyage, Sydney and several other vessels were tasked with attacking Italian facilities. Canvas and timber were used to alter the cruiser's profile to resemble an Italian Condottieri-class cruiser, allowing her to manoeuvre close to Scarpanto during the night of 3–4 September. At dawn, Sydney and the British destroyer Ilex attacked the Italian Makri Yalo Airbase at Scarpanto; the cruiser fired 135 shells in 25 minutes, while the destroyer fended off five E-boats, sinking two. On completion, the two ships rejoined the fleet, but were again mistaken for Italian warships and nearly fired on before Sydney raised the White Ensign and cut down her disguise. Admiral Cunningham congratulated Sydney with the message "Well Done. You are a stormy petrel.", which was adopted as a nickname for the cruiser. On her return to Alexandria, the Australian cruiser underwent another short refit, which was completed late in the month: on 24 September Sydney supported HMS Protector during the interception of a French merchant ship, then completed a two-day patrol west of Cyprus. Late on 28 September, Sydney joined the heavy escort of a Malta-bound troop convoy. During the return voyage, Sydney and HMS Orion left the fleet on 1 October for a sweep of the Aegean Sea, which was concluded with a brief bombardment of Maltezana before returning to Alexandria two days later.

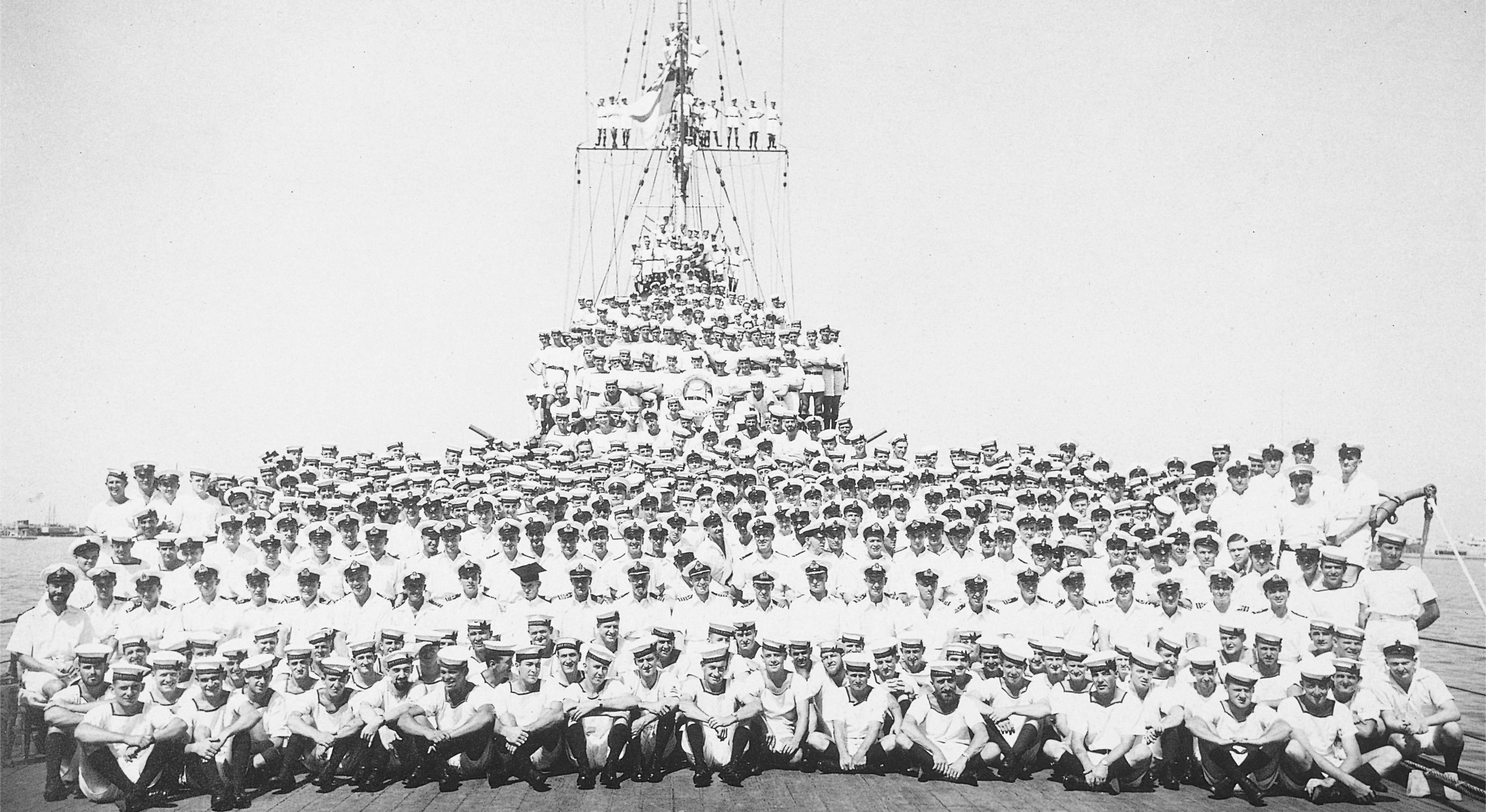
Group portrait of the 645-strong ship's company following the action against Bartolomeo Colleoni in July 1940

The entire Mediterranean fleet sailed from Alexandria on 8 October to provide cover for several Malta Convoys, and attempt to draw the Italian fleet into battle. The convoys reached their destination safely, and the operation was uneventful for Sydney; the only contact with Italian forces was an engagement during the early morning of 12 October between the British cruiser Ajax and seven Italian torpedo boats and destroyers, of which Ajax sank three and damaged a fourth. From 25 October, Sydney, Orion, and the destroyers Jervis and Juno were engaged in a sweep of the Aegean for Axis vessels, reaching as far north as the Dardanelles. No major incidents occurred until 28 October, when the Italians invaded Greece: the four ships were recalled to Alexandria, where they arrived that evening. Shortly after, the two cruisers were joined by HM Ships York and Gloucester and met the main force of the Mediterranean fleet west of Crete on 30 October. Over the next few days, the warships patrolled around Crete and along the Greek mainland, and provided cover for the first supply convoy to Crete.

On 5 November, Sydney and HMS Ajax departed from Port Said with military equipment to be used to establish an Allied advanced base at Souda Bay, Crete. After delivering the equipment, which included almost 1,000 soldiers, the equipment for a Bofors battery, cases of food, and several trucks, the cruisers rejoined the main fleet. The Mediterranean Fleet remained on patrol for several days, and during the night of 11–12 November, while the bulk of the fleet supported the world's first all-naval-aircraft attack on the Italian fleet anchored in Taranto, Sydney, Ajax, Orion and the destroyers Nubian and Mohawk attempted to transit the Strait of Otranto as a diversion. Despite the mission of "looking for trouble", the northbound passage through the strait passed without incident. The return was not so uneventful: at 01:20, a convoy of four merchantmen with two escorting destroyers was spotted by Sydney's lookouts. The Allied warships manoeuvred in close, and opened fire at 01:27: Sydney directing her fire onto a freighter 7,000 yards (6,400 m) away. During the 23-minute engagement, the cruiser successfully contributed to the destruction of three merchant ships and damaged a destroyer, avoided a torpedo, and unsuccessfully fired two in return. At 01:57, the undamaged Allied force departed the strait, and met the main fleet before midday.

From 15 to 20 November, Sydney and three other cruisers transported 4,000 Allied soldiers and their equipment from Alexandria to the Piraeus as reinforcements for the Greek military. On returning to Alexandria, Sydney deployed with the majority of the Mediterranean fleet to cover multiple convoys across the sea: the Australian cruiser spent the remainder of the month operating throughout the eastern and central Mediterranean, and was bombed by Italian aircraft on 24 November at Souda Bay, but escaped damage. Sydney started December in the Aegean, where she escorted convoys and shelled the port of Valona, then proceeded to Malta for a refit and repairs to her rudder, which lasted until the end of the year. During this refit, the cruiser was fitted with degaussing equipment. The ship rejoined the fleet on 8 January 1941, when she was instructed to head home after proceeding along the north coast of Africa and linking up with any Australia-bound merchant ships she encountered. The recall was attributed to the need to bring Sydney in for a major refit and give her personnel leave, a plan to spread combat experience throughout the RAN by trading the cruiser with her sister ship, Perth, and a need to protect Australia against the German merchant raiders operating in the area, particularly following the attacks on Nauru.

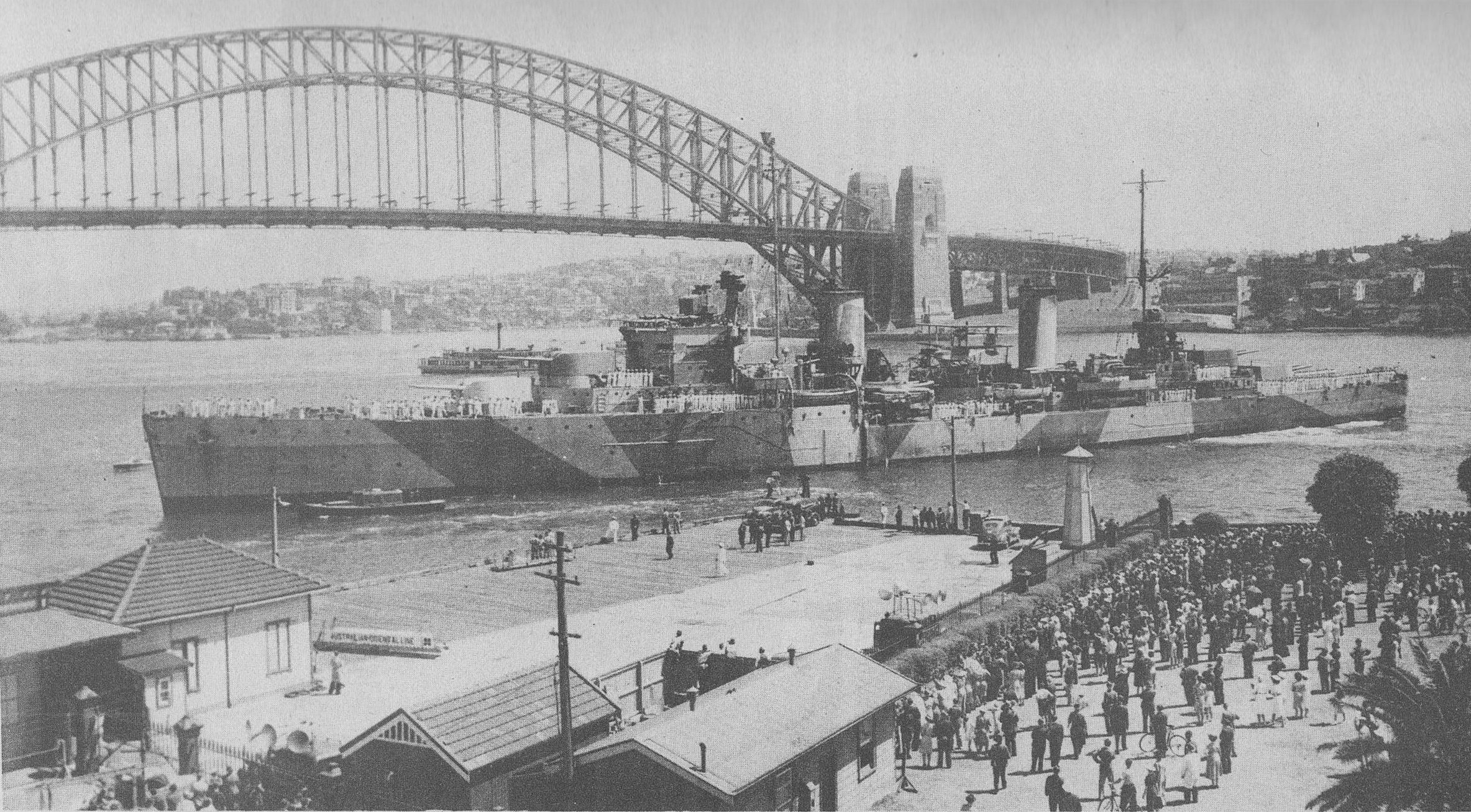
Sydney manoeuvring to come alongside at Sydney Cove on 10 February 1941

Before leaving, 100 of the ship's company were removed on 11 January, so they could be sent to England to help man the new N-class destroyers. The next day, the ship sailed for Aden via the Suez Canal. Sydney and the troopship Empress of Canada left Aden on 16 January to join Convoy SW 4B, which Sydney escorted until relieved by HMS Ceres four days later. The Australian cruiser was instructed to attack any Italian ships at Mogadiscio, but as there were no large merchant ships in port and Sydney was forbidden to attack the harbour itself, she then proceeded to the Seychelles to refuel. On 24 January, Sydney was one of several warships which responded to an attack on the merchantman Mandasor by the German merchant raider Atlantis. Despite a three-day search, Sydney did not come into contact with Atlantis. Sydney resumed her voyage home, and arrived in her namesake city after sunset on 9 February. The cruiser anchored in Watsons Bay for the night, then sailed into the inner harbour the next morning and tied up alongside at Sydney Cove to a heroes' welcome. On 11 February, a holiday was declared for school students in Sydney, so they could join the thousands of people who witnessed the ship's company perform a freedom of entry march.

As well as the battle honours for the battles at Calabria and Cape Spada, Sydney was granted the "Mediterranean 1940" battle honour for her various actions during the Mediterranean naval campaign. During the eight-month deployment, the only fatality in the ship's company was a death due to illness.

=== Australian waters ===
Following a short refit, Sydney sailed for Fremantle on 27 February, where she was assigned to escort and patrol tasks in the Indian Ocean. This primarily involved meeting convoys off the southern Australian coast and escorting them on the next leg of their journey, either westbound to the Middle East and Europe, or northwards to the Dutch East Indies.

In April, Sydney escorted the troopship Queen Mary from Fremantle to Jervis Bay, before embarking Admiral Ragnar Colvin and a party of advisors from all three branches of the Australian military and transporting them to Singapore by 19 April for a secret conference between the British Commonwealth, the Netherlands East Indies, and the United States of America. The cruiser returned to Fremantle before month's end, after which Collins handed command over to Captain Joseph Burnett on 15 May. Shortly after, the cruiser escorted the transport SS Zealandia during a troop transport run to Singapore. Sydney escorted the troopship to the Sunda Strait, where responsibility was handed over to the British light cruiser HMS Danae.

In early June, Sydney met Zealandia and Danae on the troopship's return voyage, and took over escort duties from Sunda Strait back to Fremantle. After replenishing in Fremantle, Zealandia joined a multiple ship convoy to the east coast of Australia, which was also escorted by Sydney. The convoy departed on 24 June and made for Sydney, after which the cruiser joined the escort of a Pacific convoy before returning for maintenance. This concluded on 8 August, when Sydney escorted the troopship Awatea to New Zealand, then Fiji.

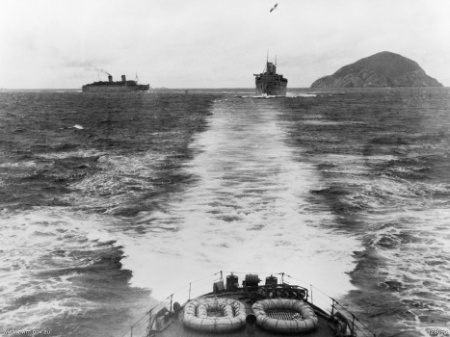
The troopships Queen Mary (right) and Queen Elizabeth (left) sailing in Bass Strait, as seen from the stern of Sydney

On her return to Sydney at the end of August, the cruiser joined the troopships Queen Mary and Queen Elizabeth during the first leg of their voyage (Anzac convoy US 12A), escorting them until rendezvousing with Canberra in the Great Australian Bight. Sydney then sailed to Melbourne, and remained until 19 September, during which her camouflage was repainted in a new pattern. The cruiser then escorted the four-ship Anzac convoy US 12B to Fremantle: heavy seas while crossing the Great Australian Bight caused "A" turret to become jammed on a port facing. This was repaired in Fremantle, and the convoy proceeded to Sunda Strait, where Sydney handed the merchant ships over to the British cruisers Glasgow and Danae on 3 October and set course for Fremantle. On the night of 5–6 October, a mysterious ship that responded to challenge signals near Rottnest Island then disappeared led the Naval Officer in Charge Fremantle to believe that the approaches to the harbour had been mined. Sydney was diverted to intercept Queen Mary before the troopship reached Fremantle, and ordered to remain with her until a channel was swept and found free of mines. After reaching port on 7 October, Sydney assumed patrol and escort duties in Western Australian waters.

The next few weeks were uneventful for Sydney, and between 18 and 29 October, the cruiser visited Geraldton and Bunbury. On 2 November, the Australian cruiser sailed to meet Zealandia off Albany. The troopship was on a second troop transport run to Singapore; delivering the 8th Division. The two ships returned to Fremantle, and on 11 November, they departed for Sunda Strait. Zealandia was handed over on 17 November to HMS Durban for the next leg, and the Australian cruiser turned for home: she was scheduled to arrive in Fremantle late on 20 November.

== Final battle and loss ==
Note: all times in this section are UTC+7

On the afternoon of 19 November 1941, Sydney was off the coast of Western Australia, near Carnarvon, and heading south towards Fremantle. Around 15:55, the cruiser spotted a merchant ship on a northbound course, which quickly turned away from the coast at 14 knots (26 km/h; 16 mph). Sydney increased speed to 25 knots (46 km/h; 29 mph) and made to intercept. As she closed the gap, Sydney began to signal the unidentified merchantman, first by signal light, then after no reply was forthcoming and the distance between the two ships had decreased, by a combination of light and signal flag.

The merchant ship hoisted her callsign, but as she was ahead and just port of Sydney, the flags were obscured by the funnel. The cruiser sent a request that the merchant ship make her signal letters clear, which the signals officer did by lengthening the halyard and swinging the flags clear. The callsign was that of the Dutch ship Straat Malakka, but she was not on Sydney's list of ships meant to be in the area. Further flag signals were exchanged between the ships, with Sydney asking the Dutch ship's destination and cargo.

At 17:00, a distress signal was transmitted by Straat Malakka, indicating that she was being pursued by a merchant raider. Following this, Sydney pulled alongside the merchant ship from astern; pacing the merchantman on a parallel course, approximately 1,300 metres (4,300 ft) away. Sydney's main guns and port torpedo launcher were trained on the ship, while she sent the interior portion of Straat Malakka's secret callsign. Fifteen minutes later, at around 17:30, the merchantman had not replied, and Sydney sent a signal ordering her to show the secret callsign.

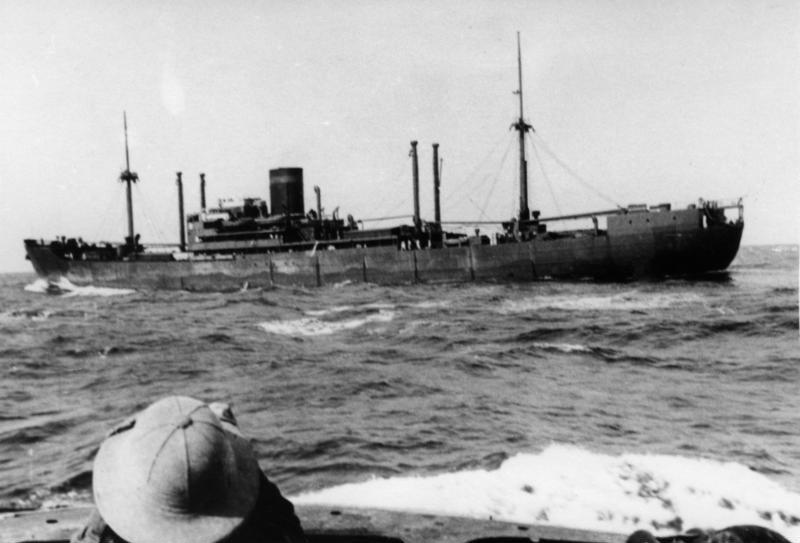
The auxiliary cruiser Kormoran in 1940

Straat Malakka had not replied because she was the German auxiliary cruiser Kormoran in disguise, and when asked to reveal a callsign the Germans did not know, Kormoran responded by decamouflaging and opening fire. Prompted by the raider's unveiling, Sydney also fired (accounts are divided as to which ship fired first), but while her first salvo either missed or passed through Kormoran's upper superstructure with minimal damage, four of the raider's six 15-centimetre (5.9 in) guns (the other two guns were on the port side and could not fire to starboard) were able to destroy the cruiser's bridge and gun director tower, damage the forward turrets, and set the aircraft on fire.

Sydney did not fire again until after the raider's sixth salvo: "Y" turret fired without effect, but "X" turret was able to put multiple shells into Kormoran, damaging machinery spaces and one of the raider's guns, while igniting an oil tank. During this, Kormoran maintained heavy fire, and around the time of the eighth or ninth German salvo, a torpedo launched at the start of the engagement hit Sydney just forward of "A" turret and near the ASDIC compartment (the weakest point on the ship's hull), ripping a hole in the side and causing the bow of the cruiser to angle down. Down by the bows, the cruiser swung hard to port, and passed behind Kormoran; during the turn, shells from the raider knocked "B" turret off Sydney.

By 17:35, Sydney was heading south and losing speed, wreathed in smoke from multiple fires. Her main armament was disabled (the two aft turrets had jammed on a port facing and could not be swung around), and her secondary guns were out of effective range. The cruiser continued to be hit by shells from Kormoran's aft guns as the distance between the ships increased. The Germans reported that around 17:45, all four torpedoes from Sydney's starboard launcher were fired, but as Kormoran was manoeuvring to bring her port broadside to bear, they all missed. In fact, only two torpedoes from Sydney's port launcher were ever fired, which must have happened some time earlier. The raider's engines broke down after this turn, but she continued to fire on Sydney at a high rate despite being immobilised, although many of the shells would have missed as the distance between the two ships increased. Kormoran ceased fire at 17:50, with the range at 6,600 yards (6,000 m), and launched another torpedo at 18:00, but missed Sydney.

The Australian cruiser continued on a south-south-east heading at low speed; observers aboard Kormoran doubted that Sydney was under control. Although disappearing over the horizon shortly later, the glow from the damaged, burning warship was consistently seen by the Germans until about 22:00, and sporadically until midnight. At some point during the night, Sydney lost buoyancy and sank: the bow was torn off as she submerged and descended almost vertically, while the rest of the hull glided 500 metres (1,600 ft) forward as she sank, hitting the bottom upright and stern first. Sydney's shells had crippled Kormoran; the German sailors abandoned ship after it was determined that below-deck fires could not be controlled before they reached the gun magazines or the mines in the cargo hold. The raider was scuttled at midnight, and sank slowly until the mine deck exploded half an hour later.

=== Aftermath ===
Sydney's failure to reach Fremantle on 20 November was not initially cause for concern, as several factors might have delayed the cruiser, none of which were sufficient reason to break the order to maintain wireless silence. However, with no sign of the cruiser by 23 November, shore-based wireless stations began transmitting orders for Sydney to break silence and report in. A raft of German survivors was recovered by a British tanker on 24 November, at which point a large-scale air and sea search began. During this search, which lasted until the evening of 29 November 318 survivors from Kormoran's 399 personnel were found, but apart from a carley float and a lifebelt, nothing from Sydney or the 645 aboard was recovered.

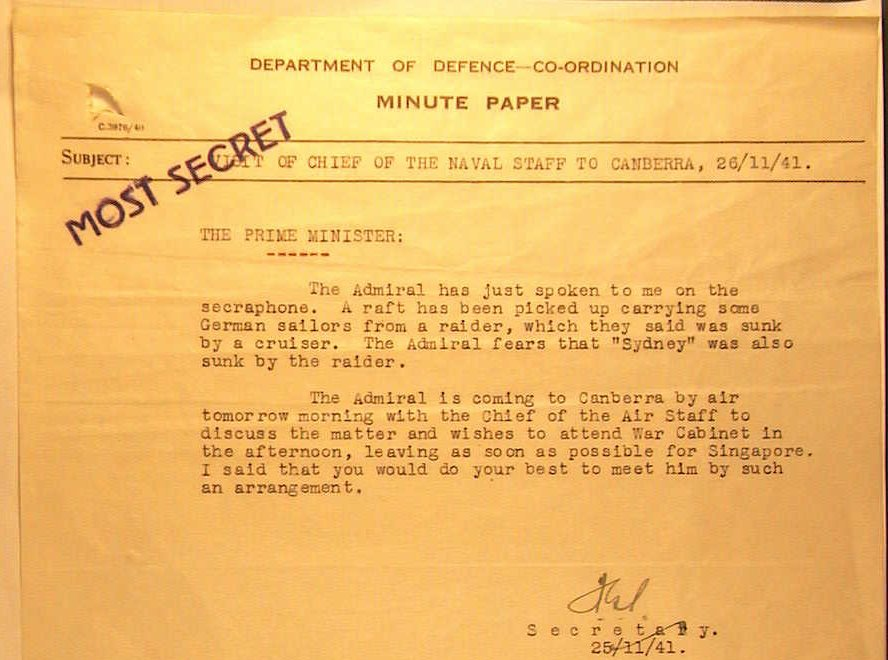
Memo from Frederick Shedden, Secretary to the War Cabinet, to Prime Minister John Curtin; the first formal advice to the Prime Minister that Sydney was believed lost.

Australian Prime Minister John Curtin officially announced the loss of the cruiser during the afternoon of 30 November. Sydney's destruction was a major blow to Australian morale and military capability: her ship's company made up 35 percent of the RAN's wartime casualties. The cruiser's loss did not have the same impact internationally; Japan entered World War II with attacks on Pearl Harbor on 7 December, just over a week after Sydney's loss was announced, and two British capital ships were destroyed within a fortnight, with the Fall of Singapore following shortly after.

The German survivors were taken to Fremantle and interrogated. Attempts to learn what had happened were hampered by the German officers instructing their sailors to obfuscate the enemy with false answers, people describing events they did not witness but heard of later, and difficulty in keeping groups separated in order to check their stories against each other. Despite this, Australian authorities were able to piece together the broad details of the battle, which was verified by a group of German sailors who had been taken to Sydney instead: their interviews showed the same commonalities and inconsistencies as those from Fremantle, and the interrogators concluded that the true story was being recounted. Interrogations were concluded in December, and by the end of January, Kormoran's personnel had been moved to prisoner-of-war camps in Victoria, where they remained until their repatriation to Germany in early 1947.

On 6 February 1942, a Carley float containing a dead body was spotted just off Christmas Island and towed ashore. Examination of the raft and its occupant led the island's inhabitants to believe that they were from Sydney. Although a 1949 investigation conducted by the Royal Navy stated the raft was not from HMAS Sydney, and while some historians agreed, others concluded that the raft and the body originated from Sydney. The body was exhumed in October 2006 and reburied at Geraldton Cemetery in November 2008, after DNA was extracted. On 19 November 2021, Australian Minister for Veterans' Affairs Andrew Gee announced that comparison of the extracted DNA with that of relatives of Sydney personnel had identified the sailor as Able Seaman Thomas Welsby Clark who had joined Sydney in August 1941, approximately four months before her sinking.

=== Controversy ===
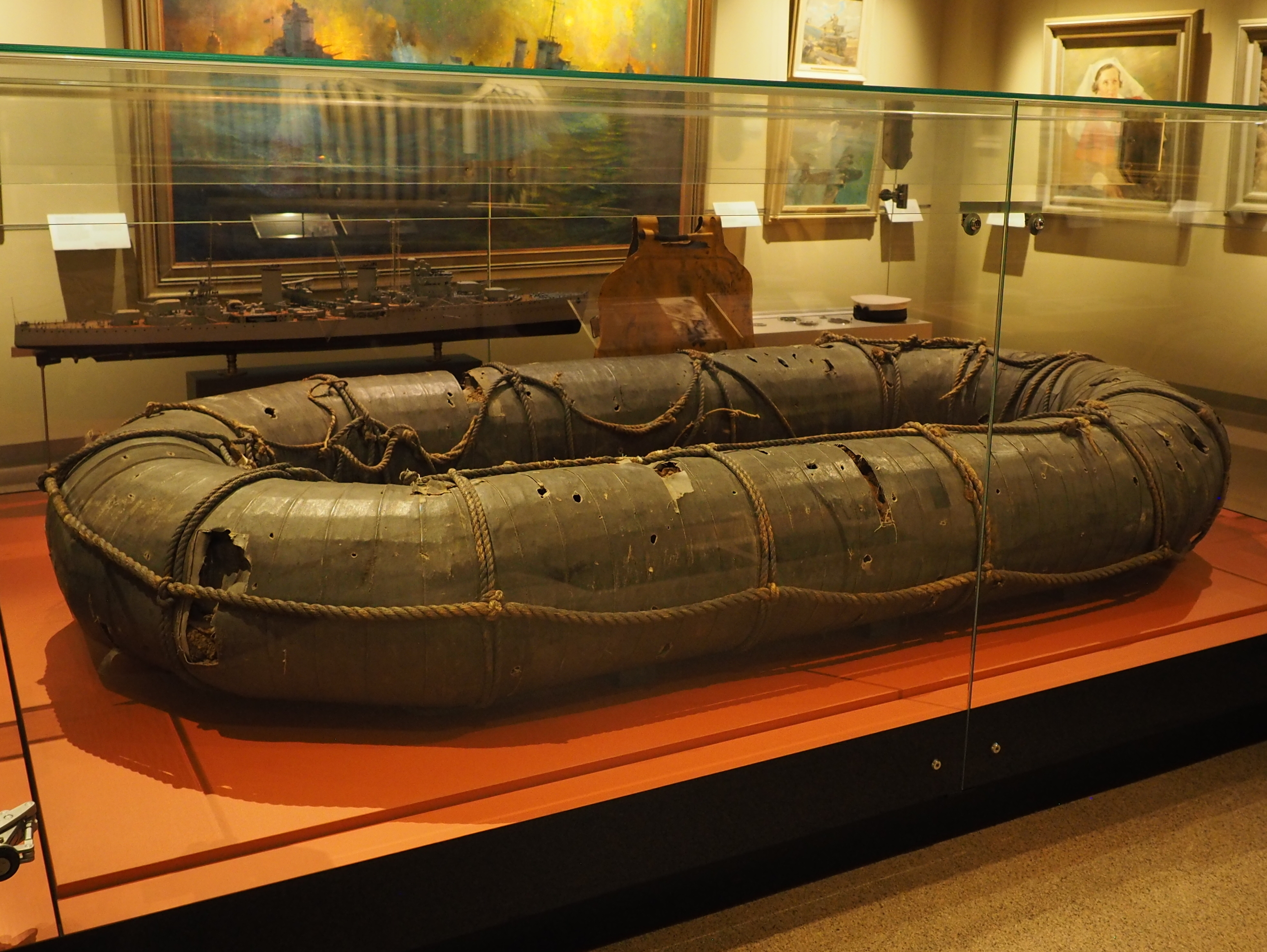
The carley float recovered from HMAS Sydney on display at the Australian War Memorial

The battle between Sydney and Kormoran is seen as controversial: the disbelief that a modified merchant ship could so successfully defeat a cruiser combined with the lack of Australian survivors led some to believe that the German account was false. Rumours that the battle was not what it seemed had been around since Sydney failed to reach Fremantle on schedule in 1941, but several historians (including Tom Frame and Wesley Olson) credit Michael Montgomery and his 1980 book Who Sank The Sydney? with igniting the controversy.

The main claims made by supporters of an alternative view of the engagement include: that the Germans fired on Sydney before raising their battle ensign, or after using a flag of surrender or signals of distress to lure the cruiser in, that a Japanese submarine was partially or completely responsible for sinking Sydney, that the involvement of the Japanese was covered up to lure the United States into the war, and that Australian survivors were killed in the water to eliminate witnesses. Other claims, less widely heard, include a belief that Sydney was not at action stations and thus not prepared for Kormoran's attack, distress calls from the cruiser were heard by Australian shore facilities but ignored, and that survivors were captured then executed by the Japanese.

These claims have been proven false by historians and researchers; the 1998 inquiry by the Joint Standing Committee for Foreign Affairs, Defence and Trade concluded that the German accounts were a "feasible" interpretation of the battle, but there was no reliable evidence to support any of the alternative claims, while the 2009 report for the Cole Inquiry (the third volume of which was completely dedicated to the "frauds, conspiracies and speculations" surrounding the battle) found nothing to substantiate any of the theories raised.

In addition, most researchers have speculated as to why Sydney was so close to an unknown vessel, with various levels of blame assigned to Captain Burnett for the demise of his ship. Theories to explain Burnett's actions include that he was inexperienced or incompetent, deceived by Kormoran's disguise, the idea that he was under conflicting orders instructing that raiders be attacked at range but enemy supply ships be captured, or that he was trying to clearly identify the merchantman.

== Search and rediscovery ==
Despite the approximate position of Kormoran being known (most German accounts giving the battle coordinates as 26°S 111°E), the required search area for both ships was immense. Calculating a search area was complicated by the fact that several people distrusted the German location, and believed the ships would be found further south and closer to shore. Several attempts to bring supporters of the 'northern' and 'southern' positions to a consensus and narrow down the potential search area were unsuccessful.

Multiple searches were carried out by the RAN between 1974 and 1997 (using the survey ship HMAS Moresby and later the trials ship HMAS Protector), but efforts were restricted to the continental shelf, and were usually in response to civilian claims that they had found Sydney at a certain location. Other searches were conducted by RAAF aircraft carrying magnetometers; again, these were only in response to possible location claims. These searches failed to find either ship.

American shipwreck hunter David Mearns first learned of the battle in 1996, and began to study it as a prelude to a search for the ships in 2001. Mearns, with the aid of other researchers, focused on primary sources (rediscovering several archive files and diaries in the process), and came to the conclusion that the German accounts were true, and that the ship would be found at the northern position. After attracting the interest of the RAN, Mearns entered into a partnership with HMAS Sydney Search, a not-for-profit company set up to administer and help fund an expedition to locate Sydney and Kormoran. State and Federal government grants totalling just under A$5 million, coupled with private and corporate donations, were used to fund a 45-day search from the end of February to early April 2008.

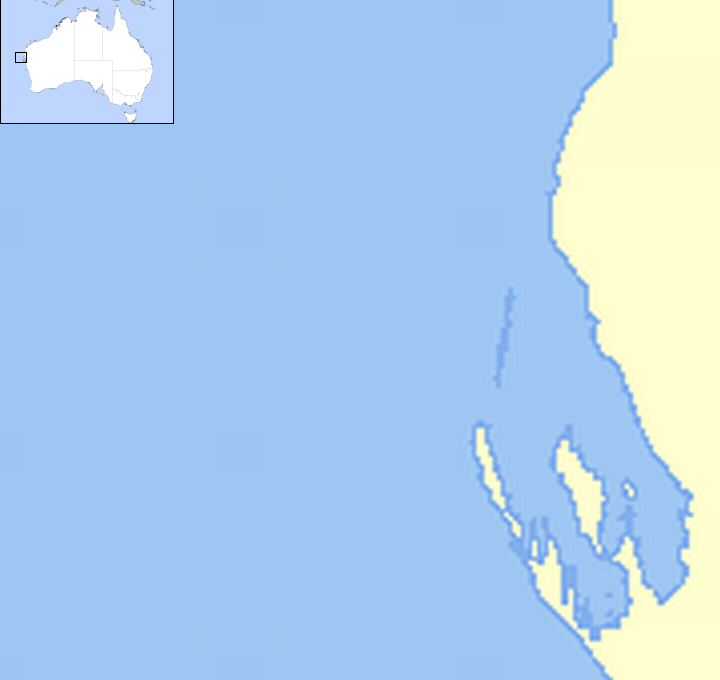
Location of the two shipwrecks

Mearns' plan was use survey vessel SV Geosounder to inspect a 52-by-34-nautical-mile (96 by 63 km; 60 by 39 mi) search box around the German location with a deep-water, towed side-scan sonar to locate Kormoran, after which the search team would be able to narrow down the search area for Sydney. After locating one or both vessels, the search ship would return to port and replace the sonar with a remotely operated vehicle (ROV) to photograph and video the wrecks. The SV Geosounder was chartered from the subsea exploration company DOF Subsea Australia.

After problems with equipment and weather, Geosounder commenced the search, and located Kormoran on 12 March 2008 at 26°05′46″S 111°04′33″E. Using the newly discovered wreck and the accounts of the Germans describing Sydney's heading, speed, and last sighting after the battle, a 20-by-18-nautical-mile (37 by 33 km; 23 by 21 mi) search box for the cruiser was calculated: the dramatically smaller area was due to the quality of information regarding Sydney's position and heading in relation to Kormoran, while the raider's location consisted of only broad coordinates.

Sydney's damaged "A" turret

Sydney was located on 17 March 2008 just after 11:00, only hours after Kormoran's discovery was made public. News that the cruiser had been found was announced by Prime Minister Kevin Rudd on 18 March. Sydney's wreck was located at 26°14′31″S 111°12′48″E at 2,468 metres (8,097 ft) below sea level, 11.4 nautical miles (21.1 km; 13.1 mi) south-east of the raider. The bow of the cruiser had broken off as the ship sank, and was located at the opposite end of a debris field stretching less than 500 metres (1,600 ft) north-west from the hull, which was sitting upright on the ocean floor. On discovery, both wrecks were placed under the protection of the Historic Shipwrecks Act 1976, which penalises anyone disturbing a protected shipwreck with a fine of up to A$10,000 or a maximum five years imprisonment. Both wrecks were placed on the Australian National Heritage List on 14 March 2011.

After the side-scan sonar aboard Geosounder was switched out for the ROV (again delayed by technical issues and more bad weather), the survey ship returned to Sydney's wreck site on 3 April, and performed a detailed study of the ship and her debris field. Inspections were also carried out on Kormoran and the believed battle site (the latter found to be outcrops of pillow lava), before Mearns declared the search over on 7 April. In April 2015, an expedition to the wrecks by Curtin University and the Western Australian Museum commenced, with the objective of using 3D imaging to map the wrecksites for further study, and to determine if any deterioration since the 2008 discovery requires the development of a conservation management plan.

== Awards, memorials, and legacy ==
Sydney was granted the battle honour "Kormoran 1941" in recognition of the damage done to Kormoran. This was one of only three honours awarded during the 20th century for the sinking of a single ship, and the second to a ship named Sydney (the other had been awarded to the previous Sydney for her defeat of the German light cruiser SMS Emden at the Battle of Cocos).

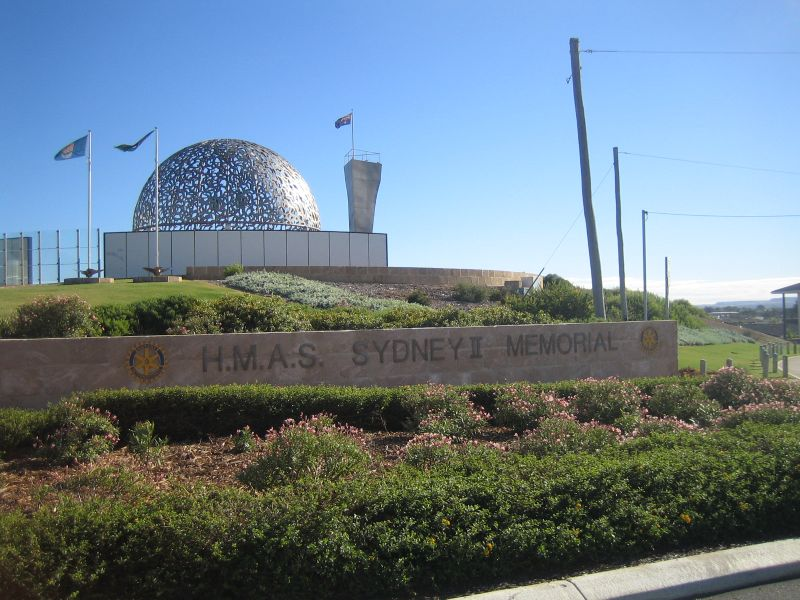
The memorial at Geraldton

The main memorial for the loss of Sydney is located at Geraldton, Western Australia, on top of Mount Scott. Planning for the memorial commenced in late 1997, after a speech by Sydney researcher Glenys McDonald at the local Rotary club. The first, temporary memorial (consisting of a large boulder, a flagpole, and a bronze plaque), was installed prior to 19 November 1998, and was used in a remembrance ceremony that year. During the playing of the Last Post, a large flock of seagulls flew over the participants and headed out to sea in formation: this became a major feature of the permanent memorial. The permanent memorial included four major elements: a stele of the same size and shape of the ship's prow, a granite wall listing the ship's company, a bronze statue of a woman looking out to sea and waiting in vain for the cruiser to come home, and a dome (dubbed the "dome of souls") onto which 645 stainless steel seagulls were welded.

The memorial (minus the stele, which had not been completed in time) was dedicated on 18 November 2001, and was used the next evening for a commemoration ceremony marking the 60th anniversary of the ship's loss. In May 2009, the memorial was recognised by the Australian government as being of national significance. By 2011, the stele had been completed, and a fifth element—a pool of remembrance containing a map of the region and the marked position of Sydney's wreck—had been added.

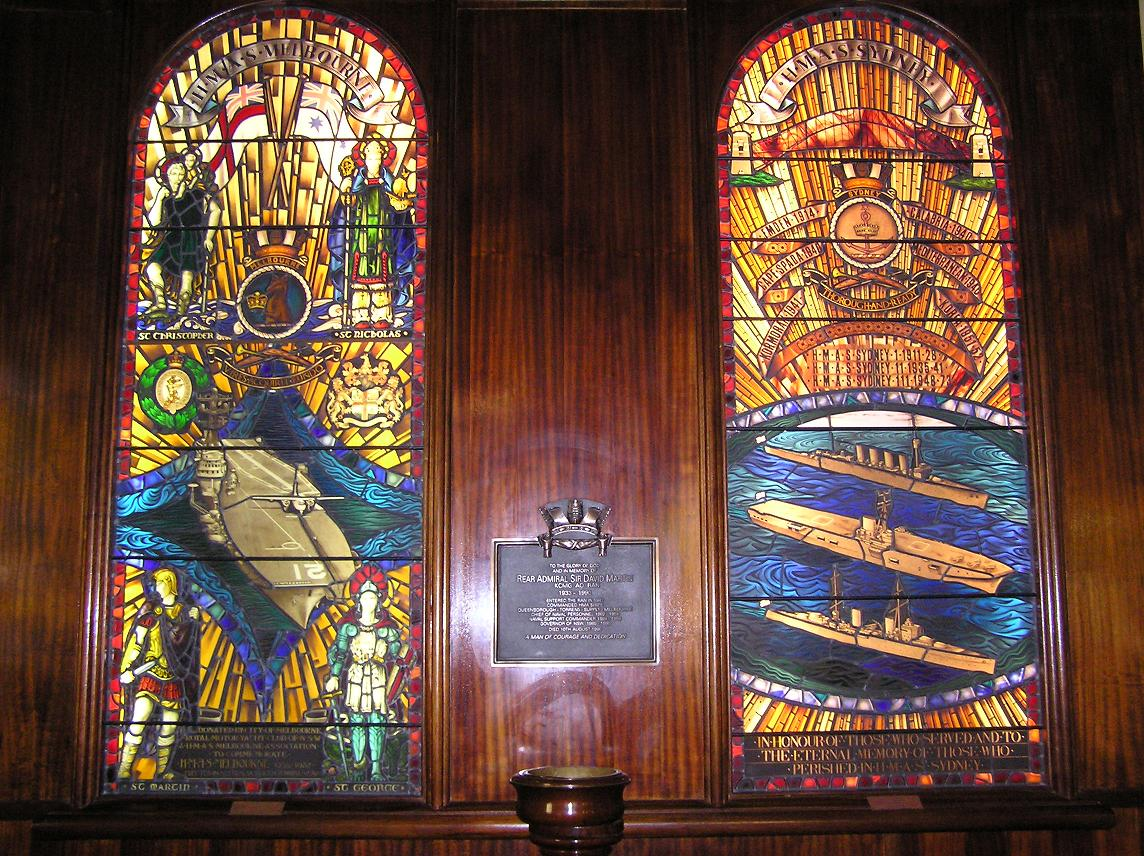
Memorial windows for the first three HMA Ships Sydney (right) and the carrier Melbourne (left)

Other memorials commemorating the loss of Sydney include an oak tree planted at the Melbourne Shrine of Remembrance, and an avenue in Carnarvon lined with 645 trees. The service of Sydney, along with the other ships of the same name, is commemorated by a stained-glass window at the Garden Island Naval Chapel, and by the mast of the first Sydney at Bradleys Head, New South Wales. The names of those killed aboard Sydney are inscribed at the Australian War Memorial.

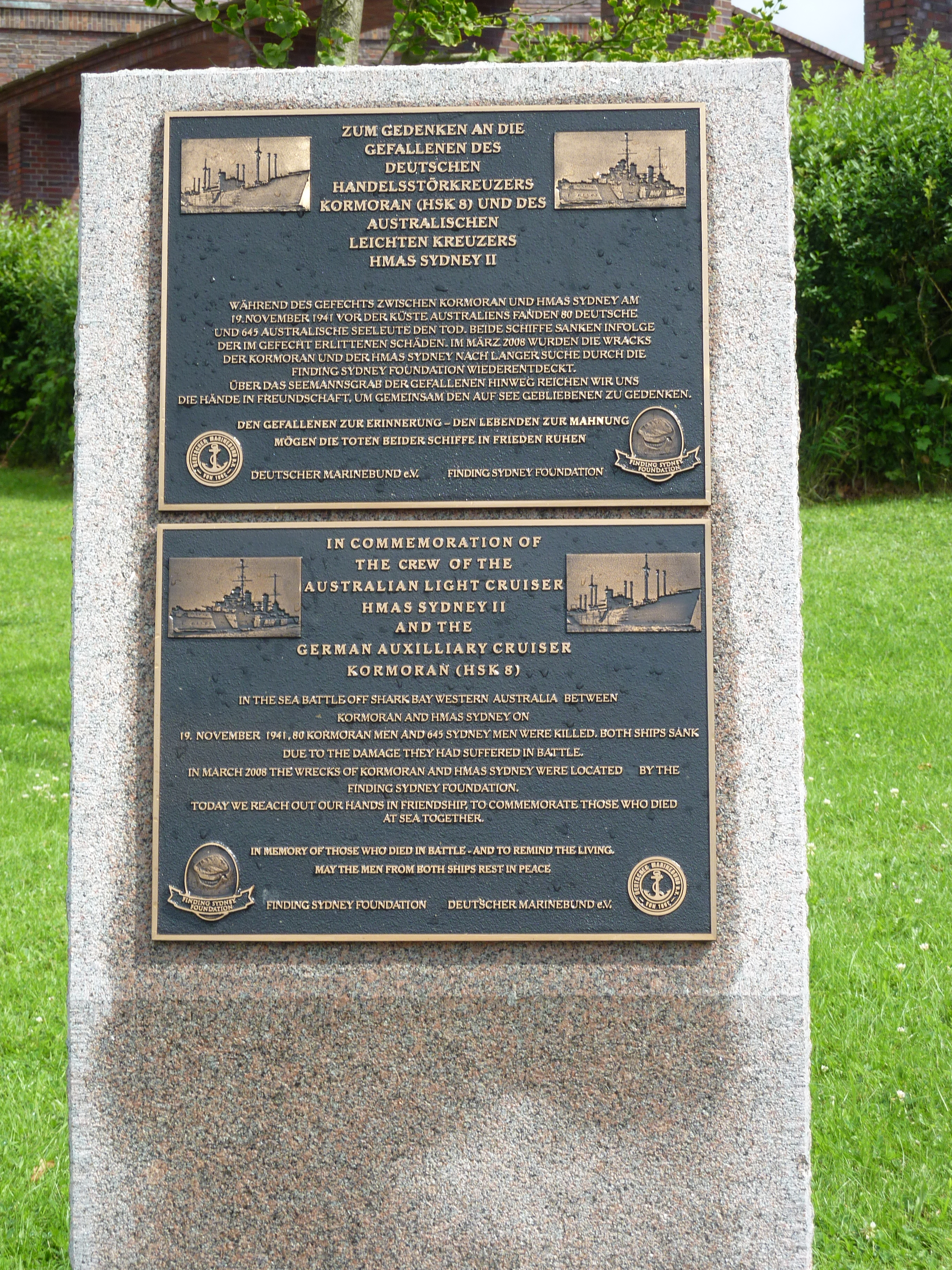
Joint Sydney–Kormoran memorial stone at the Laboe Naval Memorial

In 2011 a memorial stone commemorating both the Sydney and the Kormoran was inaugurated by former Australian ambassador to Germany Peter Tesch at the Laboe Naval Memorial near Kiel, Germany.

The "HMAS Sydney Replacement Fund" was established to help finance the acquisition of a replacement ship. The AU£426,000 raised was contributed to the purchase of Australia's first aircraft carrier in the late 1940s; the Majestic-class carrier was named HMAS Sydney upon her commissioning into the RAN in December 1948. This Sydney operated during the Korean War, then was modified into a troop transport and served in the Vietnam War, before her sale for scrap in 1973.

The Supermarine Seagull V aircraft that operated from Sydney between 1937 and 1938 still survives as part of the collection of the Royal Air Force Museum at Colindale in north London.

The "HMAS Sydney II Cup" was introduced in 2010 as a commemorative trophy competed for by two Australian Football League clubs, the Sydney Swans (representing the ship's namesake) and the West Coast Eagles (representing the site of the ship's loss), in an annual match. The trophy is based on the cruiser's battle honour board, while the design of a Best On Ground trophy for the match's best player is based on a shell casing from the frigate Sydney.
