= Waratah Tug and Salvage Company =

The Waratah Tug and Salvage Company was a tug and salvage company formed in 1931 by the Adelaide Steamship Company. It took over the J & A Brown tugs at Newcastle and Sydney.
