= Danish people in Greenland =

Danish Greenlander Dansk-grønlændere
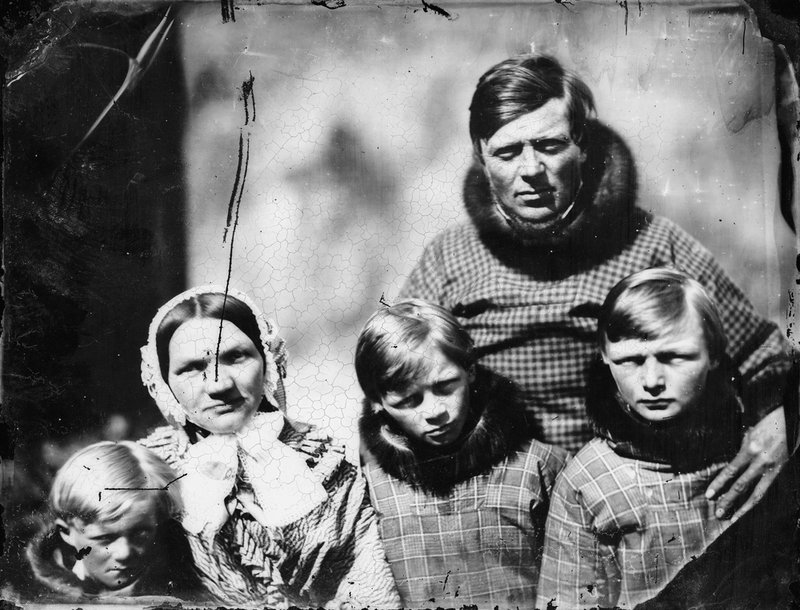
- Danish family in Sisimiut, 1854

Languages
- Greenlandic, Danish, West Greenlandic Pidgin (extinct)

Religion
- Predominantly Lutheran; See Religion in Greenland

Related ethnic groups
- Danes, Greenlanders, Greenlandic Dane, Greenlandic Americans, Danish Americans, Danish Canadians, Danish Australian, Scandinavian Americans, European Americans

Danish Greenlanders are ethnic Danes residing in Greenland and their descendants.

Danish born people are a minority ethnic group in Greenland, accounting for around 7% of the territory's population. Greenlandic Inuit (including mixed-race persons) make up approximately 85%–90% of the total (2009 estimate).

Attracted by good employment opportunities with high wages, many Danes settled in the town of Nuuk during the 1990s. Nuuk has the highest proportion of Danes of any town in Greenland.

== History ==
There were continuous Norse settlements in Greenland in the southwest from the 10th century until the 15th century. It remains unclear exactly when and how these populations eventually disappeared, but climate change appears to be the primary cause. The majority of these medieval settlers hailed from Norway by way of Iceland, rather than Denmark.

From 1721 onwards, the Danish (and Norwegian) presence in south-western Greenland was restored, initially in the form of seasonal trading posts and missions, rather than permanent settlements.

== Danish language ==
Both Danish and Greenlandic have been used in public affairs in Greenland since the establishment of home rule in 1979; the majority of the population can speak both languages. Kalaallisut (Greenlandic) became the sole official language in June 2009. Danish is still widely used in the administration and in higher education, as well as remaining the first or only language for some Danish immigrants in Nuuk and other larger towns.

== See also ==
- Greenlandic people in Denmark
