= Faroese Americans =

Americans of Faroese birth or descent

Føroyskir amerikumenn (Faroese) Færøske-amerikanere (Danish)

Regions with significant populations
- California

Languages
- English, Faroese

Religion
- Christianity

Related ethnic groups
- Danes, Danish Americans, Greenlanders, Greenlandic Americans, Icelandic Americans, Icelandic Canadians, Danish Canadians, Danish Australians, Scandinavian Americans, Norwegian Americans, European Americans

Faroese Americans (Faroese: føroyskir amerikumenn) are Americans of Faroese descent or Faroe Islands-born people who reside in the United States. The Faroe Islands are a group of eighteen islands between Iceland and Norway, and they are a part of the Kingdom of Denmark. Because many immigrants were identified by their Danish citizenship, it is not known how many Faroese Americans there are.

== History ==
The Faroe Islands were originally settled by Norsemen around 800 AD, and remained in contact with Iceland and Scandinavia throughout the Viking Age. This settlement was a part of the same population movement that brought the Norse to North America around 1000 AD.

Unlike many European countries, the Faroe Islands did not industrialize and did not experience the same population pressures which drove many Scandinavians to immigrate to the United States during the 17th and 18th centuries. In fact, the opposite was occurring in the Faroe Islands. Due to shipping restrictions and monopolistic control of goods traveling to the islands, there was a famine, exacerbated by the lack of grain going to the Faroe Islands from Denmark. Additionally, Danish laws were created that effectively barred the poor from marriage to keep the population low.

=== Immigration and settlement ===
Faroese American immigration differs significantly from that of most groups of Europeans. Faroese Americans did not come to the United States in large groups, but instead came as individuals. Men often immigrated to the United States to work, especially as sailors. Women often immigrated to the United States through marriage to Americans. Because of the individual style of immigration and the smaller numbers, there is not as cohesive a Faroese American community, as there is for many other immigrant groups to the United States. Some Faroe Islanders also converted to Mormonism and Seventh-day Adventism, and so then moved to Denmark to be a part of the larger Mormon and Seventh Day Adventist communities there. From Denmark, some further immigrated to the United States, often in larger groups, as was common for Danish emigration. However, very few people overall left the Faroe Islands.

There is evidence that Faroese Americans settled widely across the United States, and did not refine themselves to simply the areas settled by many Scandinavian Americans. In context, this makes a lot of sense, as Faroese Americans immigrated mostly as individuals, and often had different skill sets than Scandinavian Americans, namely, seafaring abilities. Additionally, around the 1850s, the Faroe Islands started to develop their own national identity, and so many Faroese Americans may not have identified closely with Scandinavian Americans that they would feel the need to live amongst them. However, there is anecdotal evidence that many Faroese Americans settled in Colorado and the West Coast.

== Ethnic identity ==
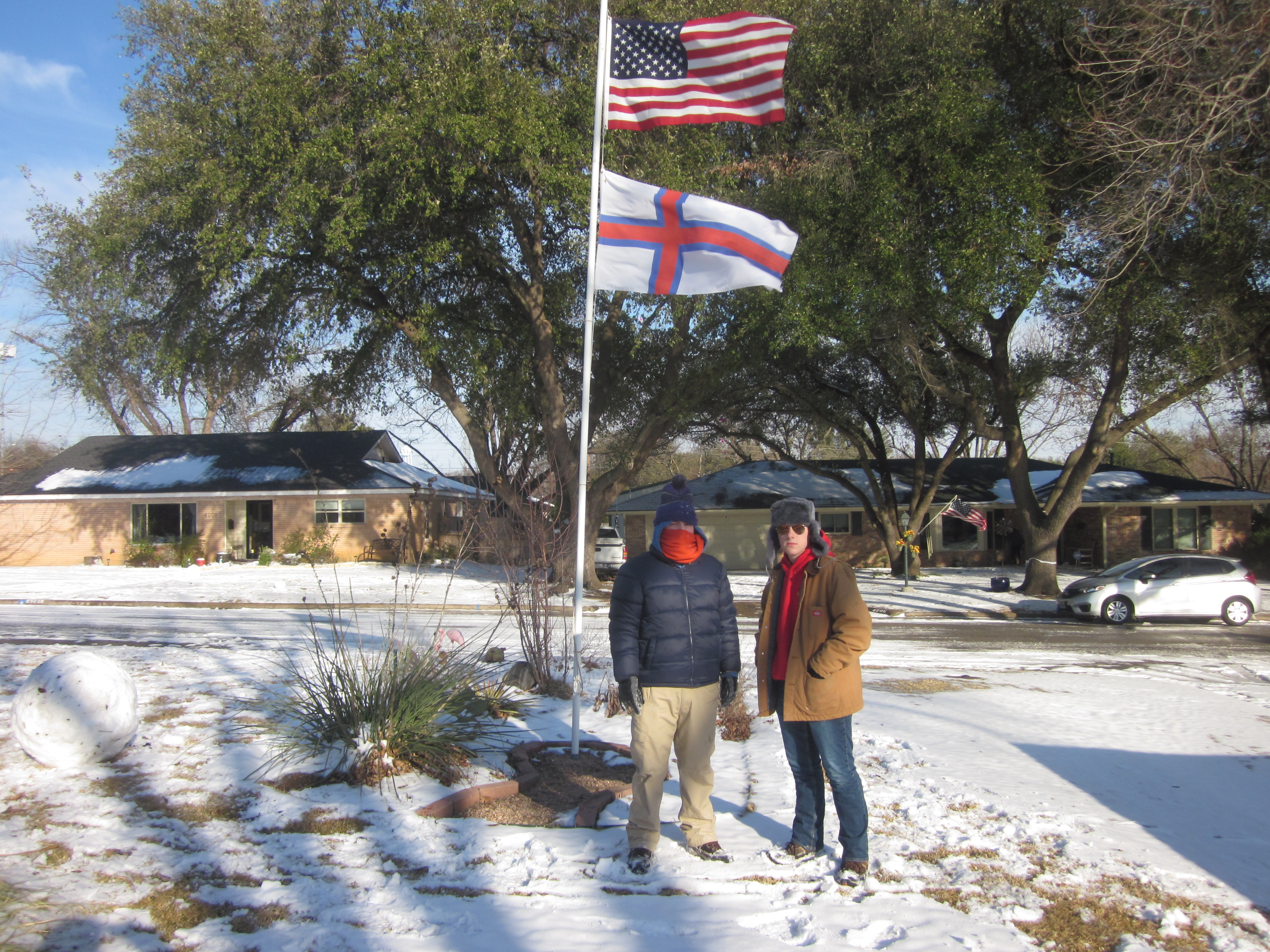
Two Faroese Americans

Faroese ethnic identity is rooted in a strong sense of place, hospitality, and family connections. Faroese people have a strong tradition of hospitality, which includes inviting distant family members they have never met to stay at their house or for a complete meal. In the Faroe Islands, many people keep in touch with distant relatives, even so far as third cousins, and so family connections are extremely important.

=== Faroese language in the United States ===
Some Faroese Americans have retained their language, but it has been very difficult until more easily accessible technology to actively keep the language with the next generation, and so many descendants of Faroese Americans do not speak Faroese.

== Notable people ==
Hanus Skálagarð - Faroese-American maritime painter.

== Difficulty in determining numbers ==
Because the Faroe Islands are a part of the Kingdom of Denmark, Faroese people have Danish citizenship. This means that in old census records, Faroese Americans would identify themselves as having Danish citizenship. Compounding this issue, Denmark created some laws that forced Faroese people to adopt a consistent last name during the 1800s, and the new last names were often Danish. Especially common are Jensen and Joensen, which are indistinguishable from Danish last names. Therefore, it is an extremely difficult task to estimate the number of Faroese Americans based on census records. Additionally, handwritten records may be mis-transcribed as the Fiji Islands, the Virgin Islands, the Azores Islands, Rhode Island, Fayal Island, the island of Föhr, or others. Additionally, spelling mistakes for villages from the Faroe Islands makes it difficult to determine immigration. This makes handwritten records unreliable or incomplete concerning the Faroe Islands. Instead, passenger lists should be explored. Research in Faroese, Danish, and American archives is ongoing.
