= Danish Americans =

Americans of Danish birth or descent

Dansk-amerikanere (Danish)
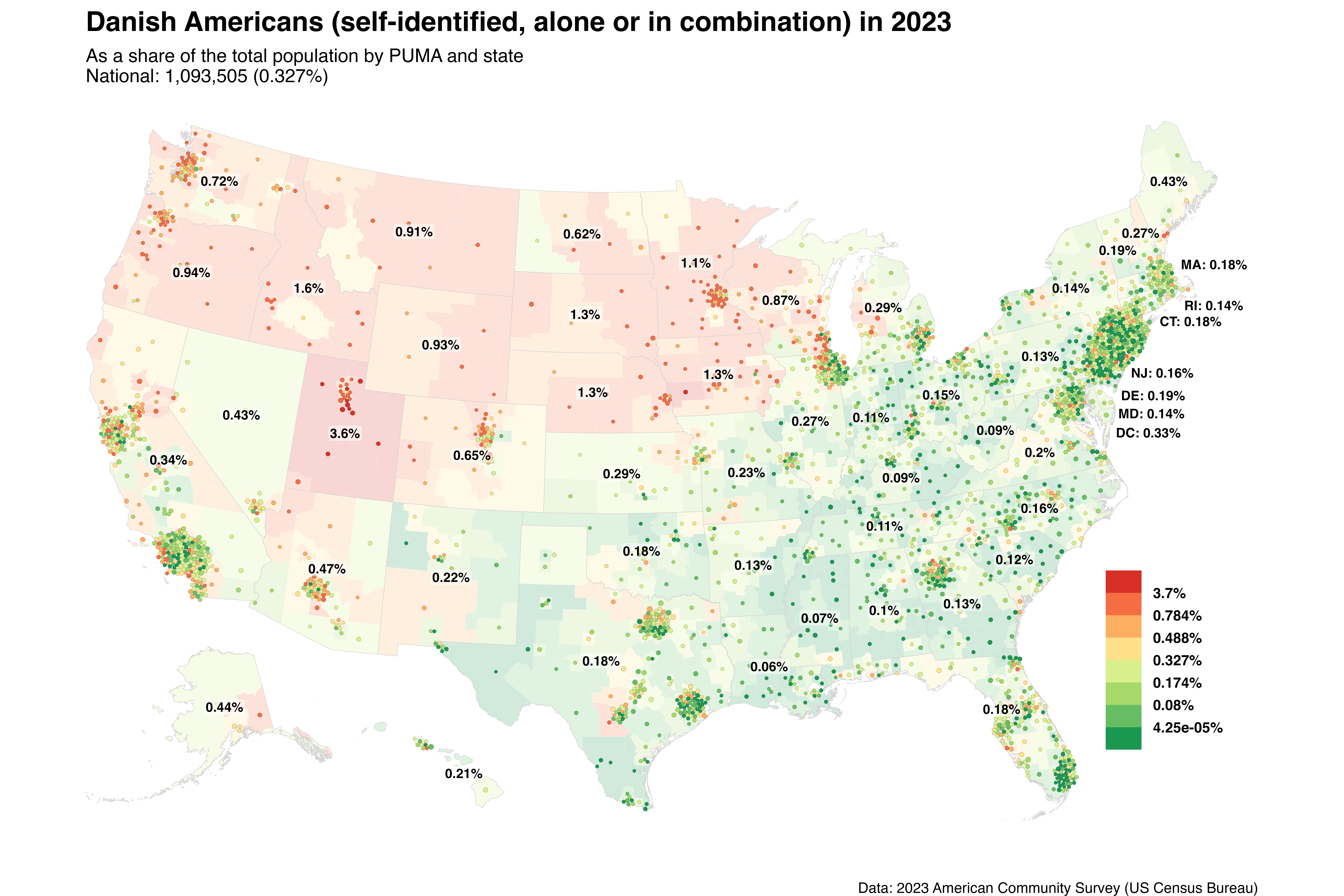

Total population
- 1,215,809; 0.4% of the U.S. population (2019)

Regions with significant populations
- Minnesota, Wisconsin, Utah, Idaho, Oregon, Iowa, Washington, California, Nebraska, Colorado, North Dakota, South Dakota, Illinois, Montana, Kansas, Oklahoma and Florida

Languages
- English (American English dialects), Danish, Danglish

Religion
- Christianity (predominantly Lutheran; also other Protestant churches, Catholicism and Mormonism)

Related ethnic groups
- Danes, Greenlanders, Faroese Americans, Greenlandic Americans, Danish Canadians, Danish Australians, Scandinavian Americans, Norwegian Americans, European Americans

Danish Americans (Danish: Dansk-amerikanere) are Americans who have ancestral roots in Denmark. There are approximately 1,300,000 Americans of Danish origin or descent.

Most Danes who came to the United States after 1865 did so for economic reasons. The Danish population in Europe had grown significantly by 1865 due to advancements in medicine and food industries, leading to higher poverty rates and an increase in Danish migration to other countries. The sale of lands was another reason for migration, with many Danes becoming farmers in Wisconsin, Minnesota and the Dakotas. During the 1870s, almost half of all Danish immigrants settled in the US with their families, but by the 1890s, family immigration accounted for only 25% of the total. Many of these immigrants eventually returned to Denmark. Greater land inequality in certain areas of Denmark was linked to higher rates of emigration. In addition, missionaries belonging to The Church of Jesus Christ of Latter-day Saints converted many Danes who moved to Utah. Danish Americans assimilated into American society more quickly than other European groups and were the least united in preserving their cultural heritage.

== History ==
Danish immigration to the Americas began with Denmark's colonization with the arrival of the Danish West India Company to the Virgin Islands in the 1660s. A small number of Danes continued to migrate to the North American continent, where the Dutch colony of New Netherlands and the religious haven of Pennsylvania also housed early Danes. The onset of Danish mass migration to the United States began in the middle of the 19th century.

The first Dane known to have arrived in North America was The Reverend Rasmus Jensen, a priest of the Church of Denmark (Evangelical-Lutheran). He was the chaplain aboard an expedition to the New World commissioned by King Christian IV of Denmark in 1619. The expedition was made up of two small Danish ships Enhiørningen and Lamprenen, with 64 sailors who were Danes, Norwegians, Swedes, and Germans.

Captained by the navigator and explorer, Jens Munk, the ships were searching for the Northwest Passage. After sailing into Frobisher Bay and Ungava Bay, Munk eventually passed through Hudson Strait and reached Digges Island (at the northern tip of Quebec) on August 20. They then set out across the Bay towards the southwest. By early September, they had not yet found a passage. The party arrived in Hudson Bay on September 7, landed at the mouth of Churchill River, settling at what is now Churchill, Manitoba.

The two ships were put side-by-side and prepared for winter as best as they could. It was a disastrous winter. Cold, famine, and scurvy destroyed most of the men. Jensen had died on February 20, 1620. Only Munk and two sailors survived to return, leaving no settlement in the New World. The frigate Enhiørningen had been broken down by ice during the winter. However, the smaller Lamprenen could be salvaged. The return trip lasted two months. The surviving crew members aboard the Lamprenen reached Bergen, Norway on September 20, 1620.

The earliest documented Danish immigrants to the new world, Jan Jansen and his wife Engeltje, along with their children, arrived in the Dutch colony of New Amsterdam in 1636.

More than a century after Christian IV's expedition came explorer Vitus Jonassen Bering (1681–1741), a Dane who was working for the Russian empire. In 1728, he documented the narrow body of water that separated North America and Asia, which was later named the Bering Sea in his honor. Bering was the first European to arrive in Alaska in 1741. In 1666, the Danish West India Company took control of the island of St. Thomas in the Caribbean and eventually, the islands of St. John in 1717 and St. Croix in 1733. The Danes brought African slaves to those islands, where the slaves were put to work in the snuff, cotton and sugar industries. These early settlers began to establish trade with New England. In 1917, they sold the islands to the United States, and they were renamed US Virgin Islands.

In the early seventeenth century, individual Danish immigrants became established in North America. Scandinavians—Danes and Norwegians in particular—made up a large portion of the settlers in the Dutch colony of New Netherland, now New York. After 1750, Danish families in the Protestant Moravian Brethren denomination immigrated to Pennsylvania, where they settled in the Bethlehem area alongside German Moravians. Until 1850, most Danes who emigrated to North America were unmarried men. During this period, some Danes achieved notability and recognition. Among them were Hans Christian Febiger (1749–1796), one of George Washington's most trusted officers during the American Revolution, Charles Zanco (1808–1836) who died at the Alamo in March 1836 in the struggle for Texan independence, and Peter Lassen (1800–1859), a blacksmith from Copenhagen who led a group of adventurers from Missouri to California in 1839. The trail established by Lassen was followed by the "forty-niners" during the California Gold Rush. Lassen is considered one of the most important early settlers of California.

From 1820 and 1850, about 60 Danes settled in the United States every year. Between 1820 and 1990 there was a population of 375,000 to 450,000 Danes; a vast majority of whom emigrated between 1860 and 1930. The greatest Danish emigration occurred in 1882, when 11,618 Danes settled in the United States.

Danish immigrant communities have been linked to the emergence of the dairy industry in the United States. In the late 19th century, Denmark was a world leader in dairy production. A 2024 study found that American "counties with more Danes in 1880 subsequently both specialized in dairying and used more modern practices."

The first significant wave of Danish immigrants consisted mainly of the Church of Jesus Christ of Latter-day Saints (LDS Church) members who settled in United States in 1847. They settled in Utah, before it became a state, which had been under Mexican control until 1848. There were 17,000 such immigrants, many of these settled in small farming communities in the Sanpete and Sevier counties. Today, these counties respectively have the second and fifth largest percentages of Danish Americans in the United States.

Between 1864 and 1920, 50,000 Danes emigrated from Schleswig, Jutland, where the use of Danish language was banned in schools following the Danish defeat in the Second Schleswig War and Prussia seizing control. They were called North Slesvigers, however, most of these Danes are recorded in the census statistics as immigrants from Germany rather than Denmark. Most Danes who immigrated to the United States after 1865 did so for economic reasons. By 1865, there had been a large increase in the Danish population in Europe because of the improvement in the medicine and food industries. It caused a high rate of poverty and ultimately resulted in a significant and rapid increase in Danish migration to other countries. Another reason for migration was the sale of lands. Many Danes became farmers in the United States. During the 1870s, almost half of all Danish immigrants to the United States settled in family groups. By the 1890s, family immigration made up only of 25 percent of the total. It has been suggested that many of these immigrants eventually returned to Denmark.

Areas of Denmark with greater land inequality had greater emigration.

== Population ==
According to the United States census of 2000, the states with the largest populations of Danish Americans are as follows:

- California - 207,030
- Utah – 144,713
- Minnesota – 88,924
- Wisconsin – 72,160
- Washington – 72,098
- Indiana – 30,000

== Language ==
According to the 2000 US Census, 33,400 people spoke Danish at home; that figure was down to 29,467 five years later (2005 American Community Survey), a decrease of about 11.8%.

== Culture ==
The Library of Congress has noted that Danish Americans, more so than other Scandinavian Americans, "spread nationwide and comparatively quickly disappeared into the melting pot... the Danes were the least cohesive group and the first to lose consciousness of their origins." Historians have pointed to the higher rate of English use among Danes, their willingness to marry non-Danes, and their eagerness to become naturalized citizens as factors that contributed to their rapid assimilation, as well as their interactions with the already more assimilated German American community.

Much that is regarded as "Danish" national culture today was not widespread in the psyche of Danish emigrants during the nineteenth century immigration to the United States. It would take the European nationalism and class struggles of the late nineteenth century to effectively seed the ideas of a distinctive national cultural personality. While many Danish emigrants to the U.S. fared far better economically than emigrants from Eastern Europe, a deep cultural awareness of Danish literature, with popular fiction authors such as Hans Christian Andersen, did not exist among the agrarian bønder or common people of Denmark. Exceptions exist, of course; primary among these are a rich heritage of folklore, an affinity to art, and regional traditions involving food and feast days.

As the Danes came to the U.S., they brought with them their traditional foods. Popular Danish cuisine includes kringle (almond paste pastry), Wienerbrød and fastelavnsboller or Danish pastry (commonly called a "Danish"), æbleskiver (puffed pan cakes), frikadeller (Danish veal and pork meatballs), flæskesteg (pork roast), and risengrød (rice pudding). Despite the importance of beer in modern Danish national culture, Danish immigrants were largely unsuccessful in penetrating the competitive American beer industry, which was saturated by immigrant German brew masters. Danish Christmas cookies called pebernødder are also popular among Danish Americans.

In 1872, Danish Americans in Omaha, Nebraska, founded Den Danske Pioneer, or Danish Pioneer, an English-Danish newspaper. Now published in Hoffman Estates, Illinois, it is the oldest Danish American newspaper in publication.

Snow College, located in Ephraim, Utah in Sanpete County, Utah, holds an annual Scandinavian Festival to honor their heritage and Danish as well as immigrants from other Scandinavian countries. The festival is held during two days in May. "And it expresses the warmth you’ll feel as you visit with us. You see, many of us are descendants of the plucky Scandinavians who crossed ocean and plain to settle our gorgeous valley. That proud past is part of our everyday lives. And we delight in sharing it with visitors." It features costumes, dancing, storytelling, entertainment, historical tours, craft and food booths.

=== Education ===
Danish Americans also founded a few schools to promote traditionalism. Danish "folk schools," which focused more on learning outcomes than grades or diplomas, were operated primarily between the 1870s and 1930s in heavily Danish communities such as Racine, Wisconsin, Elk Horn, Iowa; Ashland, Michigan; West Denmark, Wisconsin; Nysted, Nebraska; Tyler, Minnesota; Viborg, South Dakota; Kenmare, North Dakota; and Solvang, California. Omaha, Nebraska and neighboring Council Bluffs, Iowa, had major colonies of Danes for many years.

The one major still-operating historically Danish American college is Grand View University, founded in 1896 in Des Moines, Iowa. Grand View University continues to maintain a large archival collection of Danish American history. Another institution, Dana College in Blair, Nebraska, operated from 1884 until 2010, but closed its doors in July 2010 due to failing enrollment. The Danish American Archive and Library that once resided at Dana College is now independently situated in Blair. The archive contains the country's largest and broadest collection of materials relating to the life experience, cultural heritage and vital contributions to North America of the people of Danish extraction.

=== Religious life ===
Like other groups of Americans of Scandinavian descent, most Danes in America are Lutherans. Lutheran pioneer minister, Claus Lauritz Clausen, the first president of the Norwegian-Danish Lutheran Conference, traveled to Denmark and influenced religious leaders to send pastors to America. The oldest Danish Lutheran congregation is Emmaus Lutheran Church in Racine, Wisconsin, founded August 22, 1851. Nearby Kenosha is home to the second oldest Danish Lutheran congregation, St. Mary's Lutheran Church, which is the largest congregation in the Greater Milwaukee Synod of the Evangelical Lutheran Church in America.

In addition, a large number of Danish Americans belong to the Church of Jesus Christ of Latter-day Saints. Between 1849 and 1904, some 17,000 Danish Mormons and their children made the journey to the Church's settlements in Utah, making Danes second only to the British in number of foreigners recruited by the church to the state.

Nebraska, Iowa, Minnesota and Wisconsin have the largest concentrations of non-Mormon Danish Americans. The states with the largest Mormon Danish American populations are Utah and Idaho—and in the case of Idaho, particularly the southeastern part of the state.

Smaller but significant numbers of Danish Americans have also become Methodists, Baptists, Roman Catholics, and Seventh-day Adventists.

== Danish American communities ==
Two cities, Chicago and Racine, Wisconsin, claim to be the home to the largest group of Danish Americans in the United States. Racine, 25 miles south of Milwaukee has the largest concentration of city dwellers with Danish origin. A number of other communities were founded by Danish Americans or have a large Danish American community, including:

- Ames, Iowa
- Askov, Minnesota
- Blair, Nebraska
- Boston, Massachusetts
- Bowbells, North Dakota
- Brush, Colorado
- Buffalo, Wyoming
- Cedar Fort, Utah
- Dagmar, Montana
- Dania, Florida
- Danevang, Texas
- Daneville, North Dakota
- Dannebrog, Nebraska
- Denmark, Kansas
- Denmark, Maine
- Denmark, Wisconsin
- Donnybrook, North Dakota
- Duluth, Minnesota
- Elk Horn, Iowa
- Elsinore, Utah
- Ephraim, Utah
- Exira, Iowa
- Fertile Valley, North Dakota
- Flaxton, North Dakota
- Fountain Green, Utah
- Greenville, Michigan
- Hampton, Iowa
- Hartford, Connecticut
- Jamestown, Kansas
- Kenaston, North Dakota
- Kenmare, North Dakota
- Kenosha, Wisconsin
- Kimballton, Iowa
- Luck, Wisconsin
- Madison, Wisconsin
- Manti, Utah
- Milwaukee, Wisconsin
- Minneapolis, Minnesota
- Moroni, Utah
- Mount Pleasant, Utah
- Nysted, Nebraska
- Omaha, Nebraska (see Danes in Omaha, Nebraska)
- Payson, Utah
- Perth Amboy, New Jersey
- Seattle, Washington
- Solvang, California
- South Portland, Maine
- Spring City, Utah
- Tyler, Minnesota
- Viborg, South Dakota
- Washington Island, Wisconsin
- Waupaca, Wisconsin
- Westby, Montana

Additionally, Danish Americans helped settle three U.S. counties: Montcalm, Michigan; St. Louis, Minnesota; and Sanpete, Utah.

Figures from 2000 have shown that the three states with the largest Danish American population in the United States are California, Utah and Minnesota.

== Notable people ==
For sources see the main article on each person listed.

=== Art ===
- Cowboy artist and sculptor Earl W. Bascom (1906–1995) was called the "cowboy of cowboy artists" having gained international fame as a cowboy turned artist. His Danish grandfather, C.F.B. Lybbert, was a Utah pioneer. Bascom exhibited with Olaf Wieghorst.

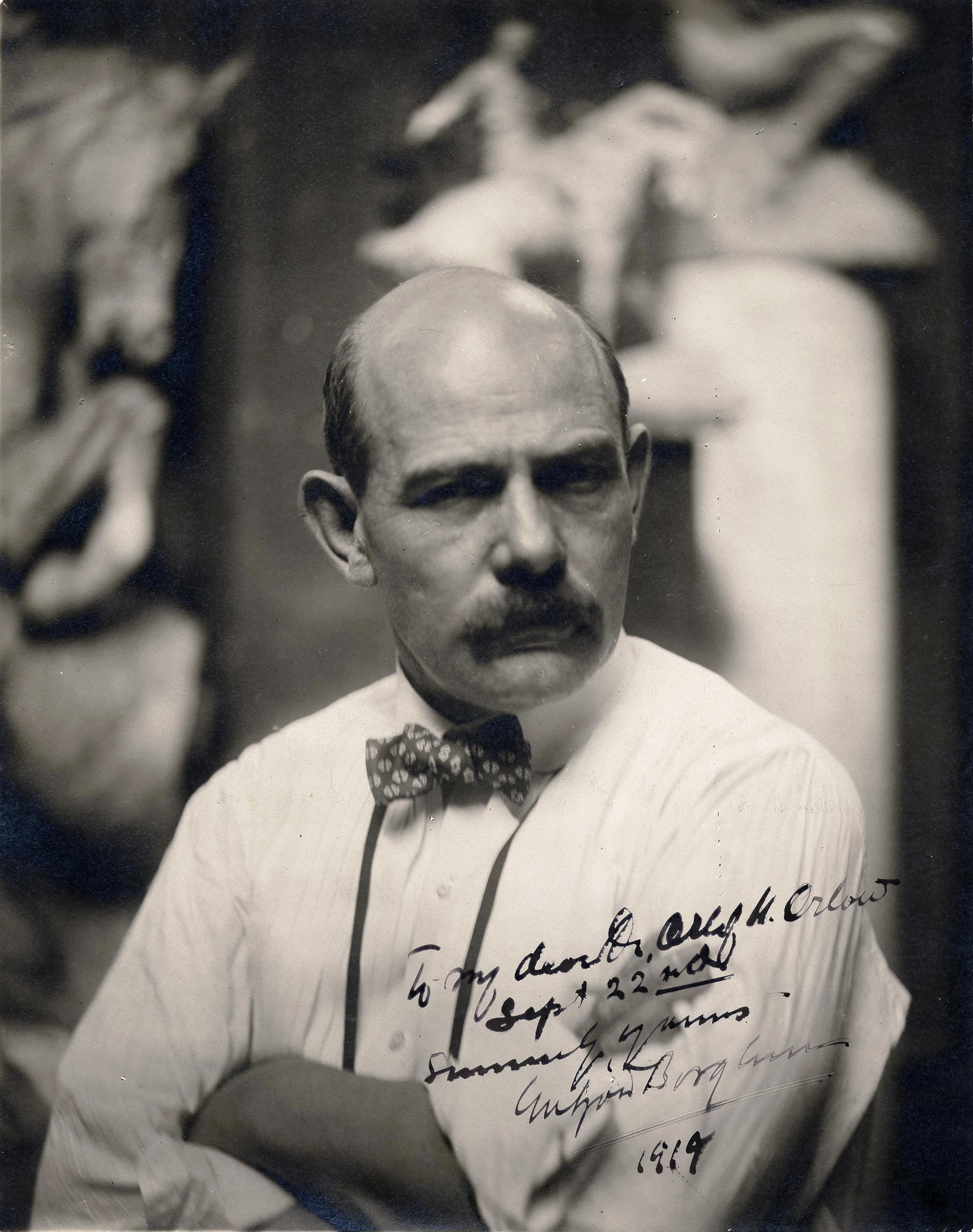
Gutzon Borglum chiseled Mount Rushmore in the Black Hills of South Dakota, now a modern American icon.

- Sculptor and popular historian Gutzon Borglum provided a staple of modern Americana when he chiseled the greatest American presidents on Mount Rushmore in the Black Hills of South Dakota. His brother, sculptor Solon Borglum, also gained fame for his representations of the American frontier.
- Another Danish-American sculptor of note is Christian Petersen, who was born in Denmark and emigrated with his family to New Jersey, where his interest in beaux-arts style sculpture began. Many of his well-known sculptures arose out of his later migration to the Midwest and teaching at Iowa State University. Among America's earliest oil painters of merit is Amadeus
- Christian Gullager, a premier painter in early Federal America, who also worked in terra cotta.
- The marine painters Antonio Jacobsen and Emil Carlsen left a considerable body of work which continues to draw strong art auction prices. Several Danish artists settled in the American West where they left their mark on the regional artistic genre. Not least among this group is counted Olaf Wieghorst, called the "Dean of Western Painters," and Olaf Seltzer.
- Johann Berthelsen was a prominent and prolific Impressionist painter known for his urban scenes, especially those of New York City. On the less formal level,
- Carl Christian Anton Christensen, is America's Danish-American equivalent of "Grandma Moses."
- Another early Danish-American artisan was Peter Hanson, a landscape painter, tulip authority, and daguerreian. Hanson was born in Denmark in 1821 and came to America c. 1847, when he settled in Brooklyn, NY, with a photography studio in the Bowery.
- Ib Penick (1930–1998), a native of Denmark, was known as "the creative mind behind the resurgence of pop-up children's books in the 1960s and 1970s.
- Roland Petersen born in Endelave, Denmark in 1926, a painter and printmaker. He is known for his distinctive and recognizable style of intaglio printmaking.
- Peter Sekaer (born Peter Ingemann Sekjær (1901) was a Danish-American photographer and artist. Born in Copenhagen, Denmark, Sekaer came to New York in 1918 to seek freedom and opportunity. By 1922 he acquired a reputation as a master sign painter and later as a master photographer documenting the New Deal and the plight of America's Depression Era.
- William Mortensen, born to Danish immigrant parents in Park City, Utah, became an American art photographer, primarily known for his Hollywood portraits in the 1920s–1940s in the pictorialist style.

=== Dance ===
The three Christensen brothers: Lew, Harold, and Willam are well known in the history of American ballet. The three carved out careers as choreographers, teachers and directors, and clearly helped ballet flourish in the United States. Willam Christensen (1902–2001) especially, was the founder of the San Francisco Ballet. The three brothers were born into a Danish-American Mormon family in Brigham City, Utah.

=== Design ===
- Peter Bentzon was a Danish West Indies-born American master silversmith and the only early American silversmith of African ancestry whose silverwork has been identified. He produced his masterpieces both on St. Croix and in Philadelphia
- Jens Risom, a craftsman from Copenhagen, who emigrated in 1939, was renowned for his furniture design, as co-founder of the Hans Knoll Furniture Company, and as a trustee at the Rhode Island School of Design.
- Tage Frid, another Danish furniture designer, who came to the United States in 1948, is likewise known for his wood furniture design and professorship at the Rhode Island School of Design from 1962 to 1985. In the field of metalsmithing,
- John Prip, who was born in New York to a Danish father and an American mother, performed his apprenticeship in Denmark and returned to the United States where he became known for his silverwork and design. Many years after creation, some of Prip's designs are still in production by the Reed & Barton Silver Company. Prip taught at both the Rochester Institute of Technology and the Rhode Island School of Design.

=== Food ===
- According to Louis' Lunch, the hamburger was created by the owner, Louis Lassen (1865 Denmark – March 20, 1935 New Haven, Connecticut) in 1900 in response to a customer's hurried request for a lunch to go. Louis' Lassen's restaurant is recognized in the Library of Congress as the origin of the hamburger, but other claimants and detractors exist.

=== Science ===
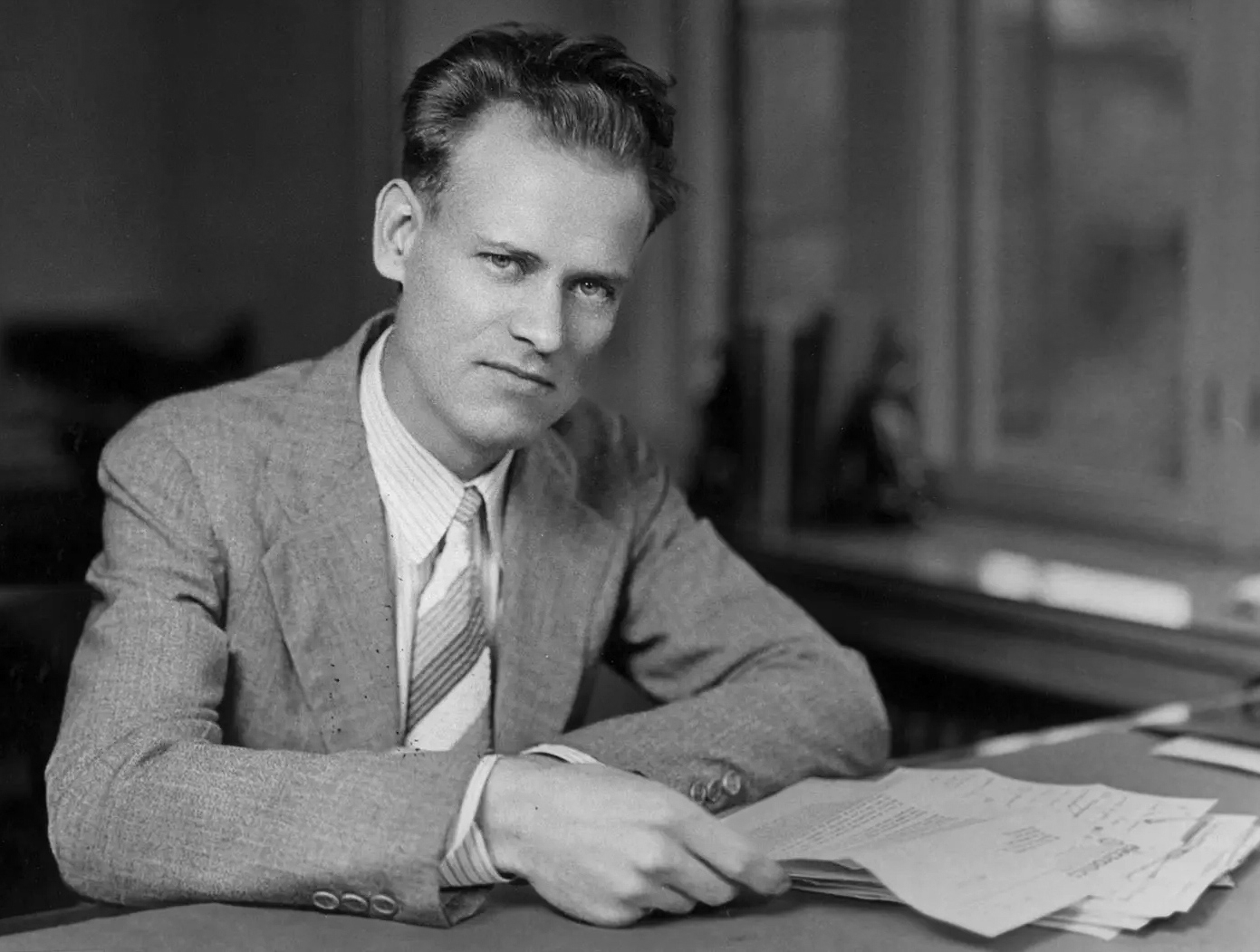
- Philo Farnsworth in 1936
  Philo Farnsworth was an inventor and television pioneer who, in 1928, demonstrated the first all-electronic television system; in 1964, he invented the Farnsworth Fusor, which he hoped would serve as the basis for a fusion reactor.
- Jens Clausen revolutionized the study of evolutionary genetics in botany, while Erik Erikson revolutionized developmental psychology with his theory on social development. Niels Ebbesen Hansen was a noted pioneer in plant breeding.
- Charles Christian Lauritsen was a physicist. In the final months of World War II he was part of the team of scientists who invented the atomic bomb.
- Mikkel Frandsen was a physical chemist noted for his experiments involving chemical thermodynamics, oil, and heavy water.
- Adam Giede Boving served as assistant curator of entomology in the Zoological Museum in Copenhagen from 1902 to 1913 and after emigration became a research associate at the Smithsonian; in 1939 he joined the staff of the Bureau of Entomology at United States Department of Agriculture (USDA) until his retirement in 1945.
- Peter Norvig was the Director of Research at Google and is the co-author of Artificial Intelligence: A Modern Approach, a leading textbook in AI.

=== Sports ===
- James J. Ward (born in Denmark as Jens P. Wilson) stands as an early pioneer aviator and biplane exhibition flyer. He was among those who attempted the first transcontinental (New York to San Francisco) air race in 1911.

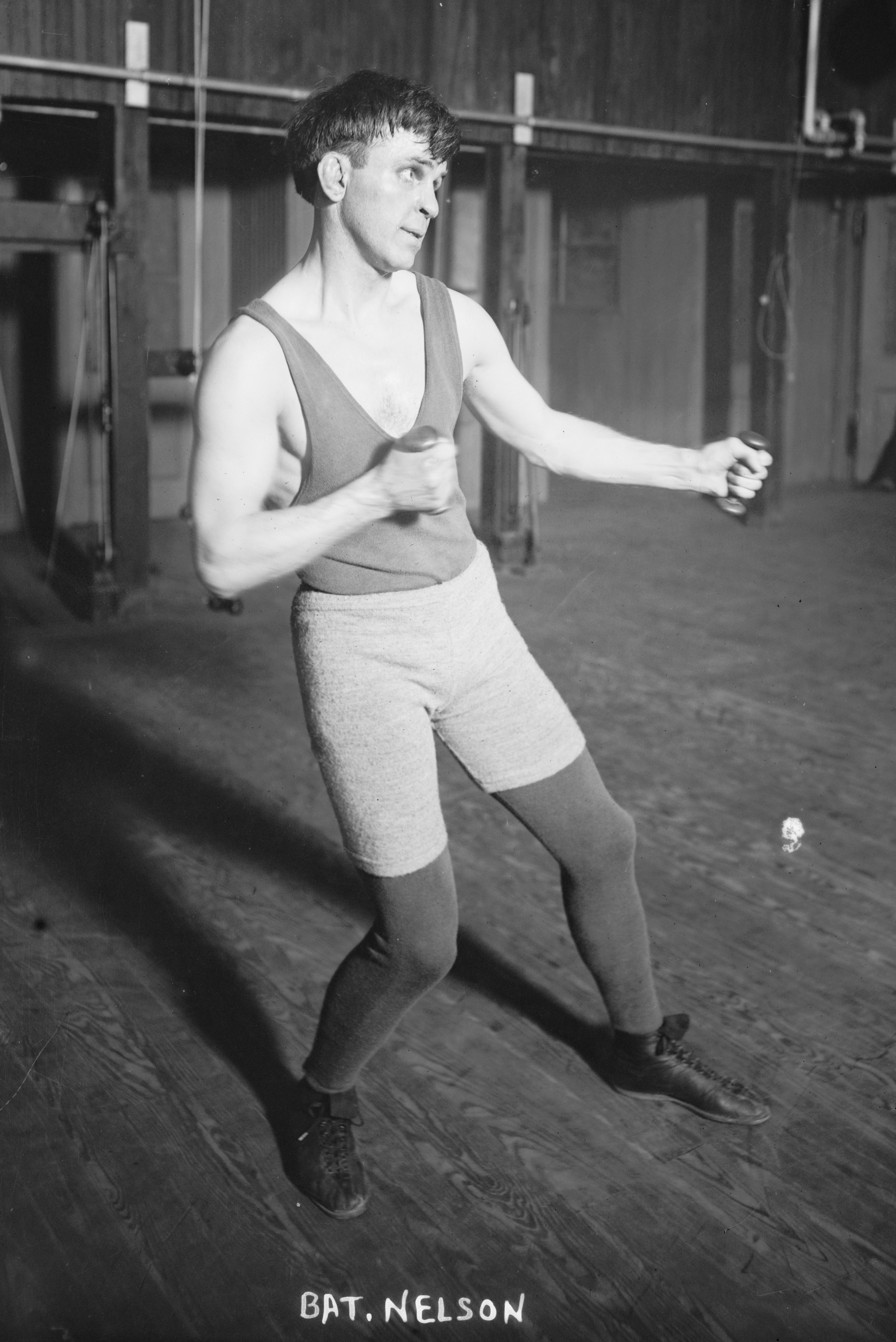
Battling Nelson, presumed early 1900s

- Oscar Mathæus Nielsen, also known as Battling Nelson, was a boxer who held the world lightweight championship on two separate occasions. He was nicknamed "the Durable Dane". Nelson was born in Copenhagen, Denmark, and emigrated to the United States in 1883.
- John Gutenko, also known as Kid Williams, was a boxer who held the world bantamweight championship. Gutenko was born in Rahó, Austria-Hungary to a Danish father and emigrated to the United States in 1904.
- Morten Andersen was a pro football kicker in the NFL for the New Orleans Saints from 1982 to 1994. As a kicker, he held the NFL scoring record until October 28, 2018, when it was broken by Colts kicker Adam Vinatieri. He also played for the Atlanta Falcons from 1995 to 2000, and then again from 2006 to 2007. Other NFL teams he has also played for are the New York Giants in 2001, Kansas City Chiefs from 2002 to 2003, and the Minnesota Vikings in 2004.
- Earl W. Bascom was a professional rodeo champion and rodeo equipment inventor. Called the "father of modern rodeo" and the "father of rodeo bareback riding," he invented the modern bareback rigging in 1924 which helped rodeo bareback bronc riding become an international sport. He was the first inductee of the National Bareback Riding Hall of Fame.
- George Nissen was an American gymnast and inventor who developed the modern trampoline and made trampolining a worldwide sport.
- Related to American sports culture, competitive swimming and sports apparel have never been the same since Danish-American Carl C. Jantzen and his partners founded the Jantzen Knitting Works in Portland, Oregon, in 1910.
- Merlin Olsen was an American professional football player, announcer, and actor.
- Mikael Uhre soccer player for the Philadelphia Union and Danish international

=== Music ===
- Gunnar Johansen was a Danish-American pianist and composer who emigrated originally to California and settled in Wisconsin, becoming the first musical artist in residence in the U.S. at the University of Wisconsin-Madison in 1939.
- Carl Busch readily stands out as a Danish-American composer who embraced new musical themes, taking his artistic inspiration from "Western" Native-American tribal themes and melodies.
- The Danish-American tubist Anders Christian August Helleberg is remembered as not only a great symphony musician and virtuoso, but his Helleberg mouthpieces, which he developed, are still used throughout the world.
- Mose Christensen was a noted American violinist; he became a founder and conductor of the Oregon Symphony. A native of Salt Lake, Utah, Christensen's father emigrated from Denmark with the wave of Mormon pioneers in the early 1850s.
- Kai Winding was a popular trombonist and jazz composer.

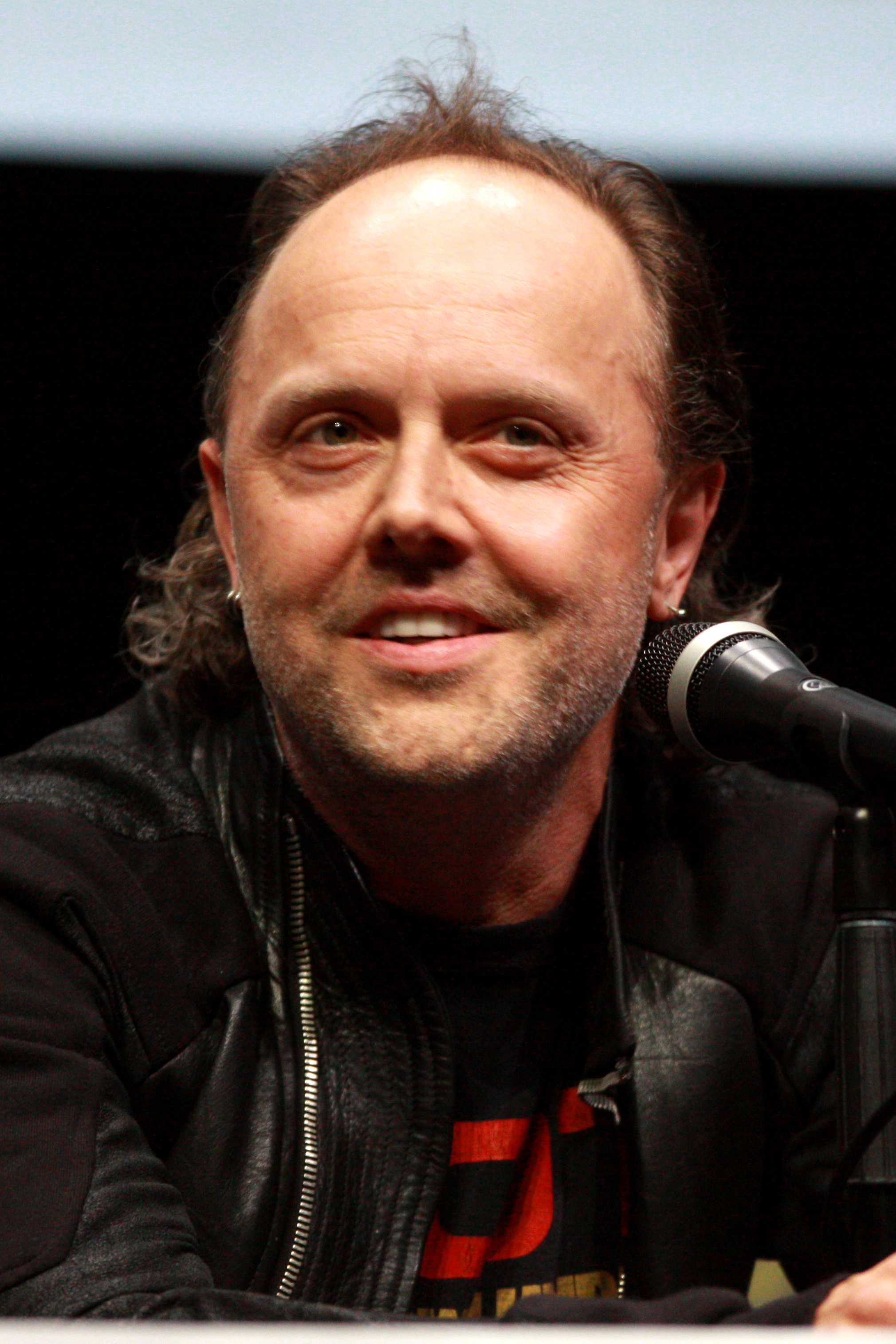
Lars Ulrich at the 2013 San Diego Comic-Con

- Lars Ulrich is a founder of Metallica and was born in Denmark. His father emigrated to California in 1980.
- Julian Casablancas singer of The Strokes was born to a Danish mother

=== Entertainment ===
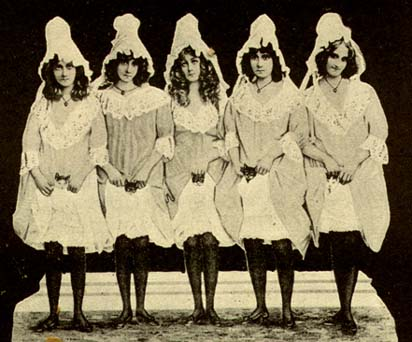
The Barrison Sisters reveal kittens beneath their skirts, at the conclusion of their notorious vaudeville cat dance, c. 1890s

- The Barrison Sisters were a risqué Vaudeville act who performed in the United States and Europe from 1893 to 1897, advertised as The Wickedest Girls In the World. The sisters, whose birth name was Bareisen, emigrated with their mother to the United States in 1886, joining their father who immigrated earlier.
- Victor Borge, known as the Great Dane and Clown Prince of Denmark, gained fame for his offbeat comedy and music routines.
- Buddy Ebsen, actor known from The Beverly Hillbillies fish-out-of-water TV series had a Danish father and Latvian mother.
- Lauritz Melchior was a Danish and later American opera singer. He was the pre-eminent Wagnerian tenor of the 1920s, 1930s, and 1940s, and has since come to be considered the quintessence of his voice type. His son, Ib Melchior is a screenwriter, dealing with science-fiction.
- Michael J. Nelson well known as the head writer of the series Mystery Science Theater 3000 and currently Rifftrax.
- Christine Jorgensen (born in New York City to Danish immigrant parents), obtained a sex-change operation in Denmark in 1952 and made a celebrated return to the U.S. in 1953, after which she gave lectures, acted, and sang in nightclubs to the applause of ‘I Enjoy Being a Girl.’ Jorgensen's autobiography was made into a film and she became a spokesperson for transsexual and transgender people.
- Soren Sorensen Adams, who was known as "king of the professional pranksters," was an inventor and manufacturer of novelty products, including the Joy Buzzer. He came to New Jersey with his family at age four. His other contributions to American popular culture include: Cachoo Sneezing Powder, the Exploding Cigarette Box, the Snake Nut Can, Itching Powder, the Stink bomb, and the Dribble glass
- Sarah Wiedenheft (born in Amersfoort, Utrecht, Netherlands to a Danish mother and an American father) is a prominent voice over actress that gained fame voicing several characters in multiple anime series such as Tohru in Miss Kobayashi's Dragon Maid, Ruby Kurosawa in Love Live! Sunshine!!, Ponytail in My Hero Academia, Zeno in Dragon Ball Super and many others.

=== Journalism ===
- Jacob Riis, a prominent socially conscious journalist and photographer, used his influence to help the less fortunate of New York City with his implementation of "model tenements. " As one of the first American photographers to use flash, he was a pioneer in photo journalism. His book How the other half lives: Studies among the tenements of New York (1890) has proven especially influential in studies on poverty.

=== Politics ===
- William Leidesdorff, the son of a Danish West Indies planter and a racially mixed part African mother, arrived in San Francisco in 1841 and became both wealthy and arguably the first mixed-race U.S. diplomat in United States history. As the United States subconsul, he played a significant role in the turnover of Mexican California to the United States.
- Charles Walhart Woodman, who was born in Aalborg, Denmark, served as a U.S. Representative for Illinois from 1895 to 1897.
- Jacob Johnson, who also emigrated from Aalborg, Denmark, in 1854 and later served one term as a U.S. Representative for Utah from 1912 to 1915.
- Niels Juul a lawyer, State Representative, and U.S. Representative from Illinois, was born in Randers, Denmark, and served in Congress from 1917 to 1921.
- Parley P. Christensen, a Utah politician and son of Danish immigrants, ran as a nominee of the Farmer-Labor Party for President of the United States in 1920.
- Andrew Petersen, a U.S. Representative from New York, was born in Thisted, Denmark, and emigrated with his parents to Boston in 1873, the family later moving to New York. Petersen served in Congress from 1921 to 1923.
- Charles Gustav Binderup, from Minden, Nebraska, and who was born in Horsens in 1873, represented Nebraska's 4th District in the Congress from 1935 to 1939.
- Herman Carl Andersen, a U.S. Representative from Minnesota, was born in Washington state and after a career in Minnesota politics served in the House of Representatives from 1939 to 1963. Andersen's father emigrated from Denmark in the late 1870s and later moved his family to a Danish immigrant enclave in Tyler, Minnesota.
- Jo Jorgensen, the 1996 candidate for vice president for the Libertarian Party, and first female Libertarian presidential candidate in 2020. Jorgensen is also a Psychology Senior Lecturer at Clemson University, a public, land-grant university in Clemson, South Carolina.
- Hjalmar Petersen, an emigrant from Eskildstrup, Denmark, Midwest journalist, and onetime mayor of Askov, Minnesota, served in the Minnesota Legislature, and later as the Lieutenant Governor. Upon the death of Governor Olson in 1936, he became the 23rd Governor of Minnesota.
- George A. Nelson, the 1936 vice presidential candidate of the Socialist Party of America, was born to Danish parents in rural Wisconsin.
- Morgan F. Larson, of Perth Amboy, NJ, the son of a Danish immigrant blacksmith, served as governor of New Jersey from 1929 to 1932.
- Esther Peterson, the daughter of Danish Mormon immigrants, grew up in Provo, Utah, and later served as Assistant Secretary of Labor and Director of the United States Women's Bureau for President John F. Kennedy, Special Assistant for Consumer Affairs under Presidents Lyndon B. Johnson and Jimmy Carter. She received the Presidential Medal of Freedom in 1981 and was named a delegate the UN as a UNESCO representative in 1993.
- Ted Sorensen, the 8th White House Counsel had a Danish father.
- Lloyd Bentsen, was a four-term United States Senator (1971–1993) from Texas and the Democratic Party nominee for vice president in 1988 on the Michael Dukakis ticket. He also served in the House of Representatives from 1948 to 1955. His father was Lloyd Millard Bentsen Sr. (referred to as "Big Lloyd"), a first-generation Danish American.
- Janet Reno, served as the United States Attorney General, from 1993 to 2001. Her father, Henry Olaf Reno (original surname Rasmussen), was an emigrant from Denmark, who was a reporter for the Miami Herald for 43 years.
- Steny Hoyer, a Democratic member of the United States House of Representatives and the present House Majority Leader, is a native of New York City, but grew up in southern Maryland. Hoyer's father emigrated from Copenhagen, Denmark. Hoyer was bestowed a knighthood by the Queen of Denmark in 2008.
- Leo Hoegh, decorated U.S. Army officer, lawyer, and politician who served as the 33rd Governor of Iowa from 1955 to 1957.

=== Movies ===
During the early days of Hollywood film making, numerous Danes and children of Danish emigrants directed, or acted on the silver screen, to include: Ann Forrest, Anders Randolf, Bodil Rosing, Benjamin Christensen, Carl Brisson, Carl Gerard, Ellen Corby, Gale Sondergaard, Gwili Andre, James Cruze, Janet Leigh, Colleen Gray, Jean Hersholt, Johannes Poulsen, Karl Dane, Lillie Hayward, Max Ree (1931 Oscar), Otto Mathiesen, Robert Andersen, Seena Owen, Svend Gade, Tambi Larsen, Torben Meyer, Winna Winfred and William Orlamond.

More to modern times, many Danes are actively involved in the movie industry. However today's air transportation no longer necessitates a Dane moving to America to be an artistic part of Hollywood. Among the few Danes who have moved to the United States to pursue careers in Hollywood is Connie Inge-Lise Nielsen, who was born in Denmark and today lives in Sausalito, California. As well as Mikael Salomon, a director and cinematographer who began his career in Danish cinema before coming to Hollywood in the late 1980s. Additionally, a few stars claim connection to Denmark via their Danish-American parents. For example, actors Leslie Nielsen, Viggo Mortensen, the siblings Virginia Madsen and Michael Madsen were born to a Danish father and American mother. Likewise, actress Scarlett Johansson was also born to a Danish father who immigrated to New York City and married an American woman.

=== Military ===
Christian Febiger was an American Revolutionary War commander, born on Fyn, he became a confidante of General George Washington and was an original member of the Society of the Cincinnati. Known by the moniker "Old Denmark", Febiger also served as Treasurer of Pennsylvania from November 13, 1789, until his death nearly seven years later.

Chris Madsen, the famous lawman of the Old West, was born Chris Madsen Rørmose in Denmark. After emigrating in 1876, he served for 15 years in the U.S. Army in the Fifth Cavalry and fought in many major Indian campaigns. After his discharge in 1891, Madsen became a deputy U.S. marshal in the Oklahoma Territory, where he apprehended or killed many outlaws. In 1898, he joined Theodore Roosevelt's Rough Riders, serving as Quartermaster Sergeant. After more service as a U.S. marshal, and at the outset of World War I, he tried to enlist in the U.S. Army but was rejected due to his age

Robert A. Arensen, FM1, USN, lost his life on December 7, 1941, at Pearl Harbor when the U.S.S. Helena was torpedoed. Arensen came from Perth Amboy, NJ.

Dale M. Hansen, Pvt., USMC, earned his nation's highest military decoration — the Medal of Honor — for his outstanding heroism on May 7, 1945, in the fight for Hill 60 on Okinawa. He was killed by enemy sniper fire three days later. Hansen came from Wisner, Nebraska. Camp Hansen, one of the ten Marine Corps camps on Okinawa, is named in honor of Pvt. Hansen.

William S. Knudsen, an emigrant from Copenhagen, Denmark, and leading executive in the automobile industry, accepted President Franklin Roosevelt's urging to manage the task of overseeing America's vast wartime military armament and supply production. In 1942, Knudsen accepted a brevet commission and served for the duration of the war as a Lieutenant General in the U.S. Army.

Danish born Congressional Medal of Honor recipients

- James Miller (Medal of Honor) (1865), Quartermaster, USN, U.S.S. Marblehead, for action on St. John's Island on December 25, 1863. Born Denmark.
- John Brown (Medal of Honor) (1866), Captain of the Afterguard, USN, for rescuing two seamen of the U.S.S. Winooski off Eastport, ME, on May 10, 1866. Born in Denmark.
- James Benson (Medal of Honor) (1872), Seaman, USN, U.S.S. Ossipee, for lifesaving on June 20, 1872. Born Denmark.
- Claus Kristian Randolph Clausen, (1899) Coxwain, USN, for heroism connected to the sinking of the U.S.S. Merrimac, Santiago, Cuba, on June 2, 1898. Born Denmark.
- Frederick Muller (1901), Mate, USN, U.S.S. Wompatuck, for action at Manzanillo, Cuba, on June 30, 1898. Born Denmark.
- Gotfred Jensen (1906), Private. Co. D, 1st ND Vol. Inf. for action at San Miguel de Mayumo, Luzon, Philippine Islands, on May 13, 1899. Born Denmark.

=== Criminals ===
Robert Hansen (Robert Christian Hansen) was a serial killer, who between 1980 and 1983 murdered between 17 and 21 people near Anchorage, Alaska. Hansen was born in Estherville, Iowa, to Christian and Edna Hansen. Hansen's father was a Danish immigrant baker and he worked in his father's bakery as a youth. It is theorized that Hansen began killing prostitutes around 1980. After paying women for their services, he would kidnap, torture, and rape them, further binding and flying them to his cabin in the Knik River Valley in his private airplane. Once there, he would release his victim on a river sandbar, stalk and then kill them with a hunting knife or carbine as they fled through the woods. Apprehended in 1983, Hansen was convicted in 1984 and sentenced to 461 years plus life, without chance of parole. He was imprisoned at Spring Creek Correctional Center in Seward, Alaska. The Hansen case served as inspiration for the action thriller Naked Fear (2007).

Thor Nis Christiansen was a serial killer from Solvang, California. He was born in Denmark and emigrated to Inglewood with his parents and on to Solvang when he was five years old. His father, Nis, ran a restaurant in Solvang. In sum, Thor Christiansen was obsessed with fantasies of shooting women and having sex with their corpses. Christiansen killed four women and his fifth victim escaped with serious wounds. After conviction, he was stabbed to death in Folsom State Prison in 1981.

Bjarne Skounborg, born Peter Kenneth Bostrøm Lundin, (more commonly known as Peter Lundin), is a convicted murderer. He was born in Solrød Strand, Denmark in 1971 and emigrated to the United States when he was seven years old. In April 1991, Lundin strangled his mother to death in Maggie Valley, North Carolina, and, with the help of his father, he buried her body on a Cape Hatteras beach, where it was later found. In 1992, Lundin was sentenced to 15 years imprisonment for the murder and in 1999 Lundin was released from prison for capacity reasons and deported back to Denmark. After his return to Denmark he was convicted for killing his girlfriend and her two sons and is currently serving life imprisonment.

George Anderson

George Anderson also known as George "Dutch" Anderson was an early Prohibition-era gang criminal in the mid-1920s. Anderson was born Ivan Dahl von Teler to a wealthy Danish family circa 1880, graduated from the universities of Heidelberg and Uppsala, and emigrated to the United States around the start of the 20th century. Anderson, along with Gerald Chapman (America's first Public Enemy Number One), operated a Prohibition-era gang during the late 1910s until the mid-1920s. After settling in New York City, he and his associates successfully robbed a U.S. Mail truck of $2.4 million in cash, stocks, bonds, and jewelry, an act that was at the time the largest robbery in U.S. history and became known as the "Great Post Office Robbery of 1921." After even more robberies, Anderson and Chapman were finally captured, tried, and sentenced to 25 years in prison, to be served at the Atlanta Federal Penitentiary. However, after serving a mere seven months Anderson and Chapman both escaped. Chapman was captured shortly after his escape and while a fugitive Anderson swore revenge. In Indiana he killed a key prosecution witness from Chapman's trial and drew further attention by passing poor-quality counterfeit currency in Michigan. Ultimately, Anderson was arrested, made a short-lived escape, and was killed in a police shootout while trying to flee on October 31, 1925. Anderson's remarkable criminal infamy included burglary, armed robbery, boot-legging, prison escape, counterfeiting, and murder.

== See also ==
- Scandinavian American
- Finnish Americans
- Norwegian American
- Swedish American
- List of Danish Americans
- Faroese Americans
- Greenlandic Americans
- Icelandic Americans
- Denmark–United States relations

== Bibliography ==
- Anderson, Iain. "‘We’re coming!’ Danish American identity, fraternity, and political remittances in the era of World War II." Journal of Ethnic and Migration Studies 46.6 (2020): 1094–1111.
- Beasley, Norman. Knudsen: a Biography, New York: Whittlesey House, 1947.
- Balogh, Laura Petersen. Karl Dane: A Biography and Filmography, Jefferson, NC: McFarland & Company, 2009.
- Brøndal, Jørn. "Danish Americans as portrayed by Danish travel writers in the second half of the nineteenth century." in Nordic Whiteness and Migration to the USA: A Historical Exploration of Identity (2020).
- Christensen, Thomas Peter. A History of the Danes in Iowa (Solvang, Calif., 1952), scholarly.
- Croy, Homer Trigger Marshal. The Story of Chris Madsen, New York: Duell, Sloan and Pearce, 1958.
- Davis, John L. The Danish Texans, San Antonio, TX: Institute of Texan Cultures, University of Texas, 1984.
- DeLong, Lea Rosson. Christian Petersen: Sculptor, Ames, IA: Brunnier Art Museum, Iowa State University Press, 2000.
- Evjen, John Oluf. Scandinavian Immigrants in New York 1630–1674, Minneapolis: K.C. Holter Pub., 1916.
- Hale, Frederick. Danes in Wisconsin (2nd ed. Wisconsin Historical Society, 2005).
- Hvidt, Kristian. Flight to America: The Social Background of 300,000 Danish Emigrants (1975), scholarly study of emigration from 1868 to 1900.
- Hvidt, Kristian. Danes Go West: A Book about the Emigration to America (Copenhagen, 1976), is a popularized account
- Jensen, Carl Christian. An American Saga, Boston: Little, Brown and Company, 1927.
- Jorgensen, Christine. Christine Jorgensen: A Personal Autobiography, New York: Paul S. Eriksson, Inc., 1967.
- Marzolf, Marion. The Danish-language press in America (Ayer, 1979)
- Mortensen, Enok. Danish-American life and letters (Ayer, 1979)
- Nelson, O. N. History of the Scandinavians and Successful Scandinavians in the United States (2 vol 1904); 886pp online also online review
- Nielsen, George R. The Danish-Americans (Twayne, 1981)
- Nielsen, John Mark, and Peter L. Petersen. "Danish Americans." in Gale Encyclopedia of Multicultural America, edited by Thomas Riggs, (3rd ed., vol. 2, Gale, 2014), pp. 1–14. online.
- Nokkentved, Christian Ditlev. "Danes, Denmark And Racine, 1837–1924: A Study Of Danish And Overseas Migration" (PhD dissertation, University of Illinois at Chicago; ProQuest Dissertations Publishing, 1984. 8501251).
- Paulsen, Frank M. Danish-American folk traditions: a study in fading survivals (Indiana University Press, 1967)
- Price, Willadene. Gutzon Borglum: Artist and Patriot, New York: Rand McNally, 1961.
- Sadik, Marvin. Christian Gullager: Portrait Painter to Federal America, Washington: National Portrait Gallery, Smithsonian Institution, 1976.
- Shaff, Howard and Shaff, Audrey Karl. Six Wars at a Time: The life and times of Gutzon Borglum, Sioux Falls: Center for Western Studies, 1985.
- Stølen, Marianne. "Codeswitching for humour and ethnic identity: Written Danish‐American occasional songs." Journal of Multilingual & Multicultural Development (1992) 13#1–2 pp: 215–228.
- Thernstrom, Stephan, ed. Harvard Encyclopaedia of American Ethnic Groups (Harvard University Press, 1980) pp. 272–282.

=== Religion and schools ===
- Anderson, . Arlow W. The Salt of the Earth: A History of Norwegian-Danish Methodism in America (1962)
- Christensen, William E. Saga of the Tower: A History of Dana College and Trinity Seminary (1959)
- Hansen, Thorvald. We Laid Foundation Here: The Early History of Grand View College (Des Moines, 1972)
- Hansen, Thorvald. School in the Woods (Askov, Minn., 1977), the troubled history of the first Danish-American Lutheran seminary,
- Jensen, John M. The United Evangelical Lutheran Church (1964)
- Mortensen, Enok. The Danish Lutheran Church in America: The History and Heritage of the American Evangelical Lutheran Church (1967)
- Mortensen, Enok. Schools for Life: A Danish-American Experiment in Adult Education (Askov, 1977), history of Grundtvigian folk schools in America.
- Nyholm, Paul C. The Americanization of the Danish Lutheran Churches in America (Copenhagen, 1963)

=== In Danish ===
- Christensen, Thomas Peter. Dansk Amerikansk historie, Cedar Falls, IA: K.C. Holst Pub., 1927.
- Garde, H. F.. Peter Bentzon – en vestindisk guldsmed, Personalhistorisk Tidsskrift 1993:1, pp. 68–83.
- Henius, Max. Den Danskfødte Amerikaner, Copenhagen: Gyldendalske Boghandel, 1912.
- Hvidt, Kristian. Danske veje vestpå. Rebild National Park, 1976.
- Jensen, Arne Hall. Den Dansk-Amerikanske Historie: En Udførlig Skildrig af de Danske Udvandrere til Amerika fra Tidligste Tid til Vore Dage, København: Arthur Jensens Forlag, 1937.
- Sønnichsen, Ole, Rejsen til Amerika (Fortællingen om de danske udvandrere), Bind I: Drømmen om et nyt liv (Gyldendal 2013)
- Sønnichsen, Ole, Rejsen til Amerika (Fortællingen om de danske udvandrere), Bind II: Jagten på lykken (Gyldendal 2015)–-
- Vig, Peter Sørensen. Danske i Amerika, Minneapolis: C. Rasmussen Pub., 1907.
- Vig, Peter Sørensen. Den danske udvandring til Amerika, Danish Luth. Pub. House, 1915.
