= Greenlandic Americans =

Americans of Greenlandic birth or descent

Kalaallit Amerikamiut (Greenlandic) Grønlandsk-amerikanere (Danish)

Total population
- 352

Languages
- American English, Greenlandic, Danish, Danglish

Religion
- Christianity (Lutheranism), Irreligion, Inuit religion

Related ethnic groups
- Greenlanders, Danes, Danish Americans, Faroese Americans, Scandinavian Americans, European Americans, Iñupiat, Native Americans, Sami Americans

Greenlandic Americans (Greenlandic: Kalaallit Amerikkarmiut; Danish: Grønlandsk-amerikanere) are Americans of Greenlandic descent.

Greenlandic Americans are often categorized as Scandinavian or Danish Americans, because of Greenland's status as an autonomous territory of Denmark. Some are in fact of Danish descent, though many are of Inuit ancestry, which is culturally distinct despite geographic similarities.

== Notable Greenlandic Americans ==
- Amandla Stenberg, actress
- Karina Møller, singer from the musical group Pamyua
- Maligiaq Padilla, kayaker
- Minik Wallace
- Simon Lynge, singer

== See also ==
- European Americans
- Hyphenated American
- Nordic and Scandinavian Americans
