= Nordic and Scandinavian Canadians =

Nordic Canadians Scandinavian Canadians
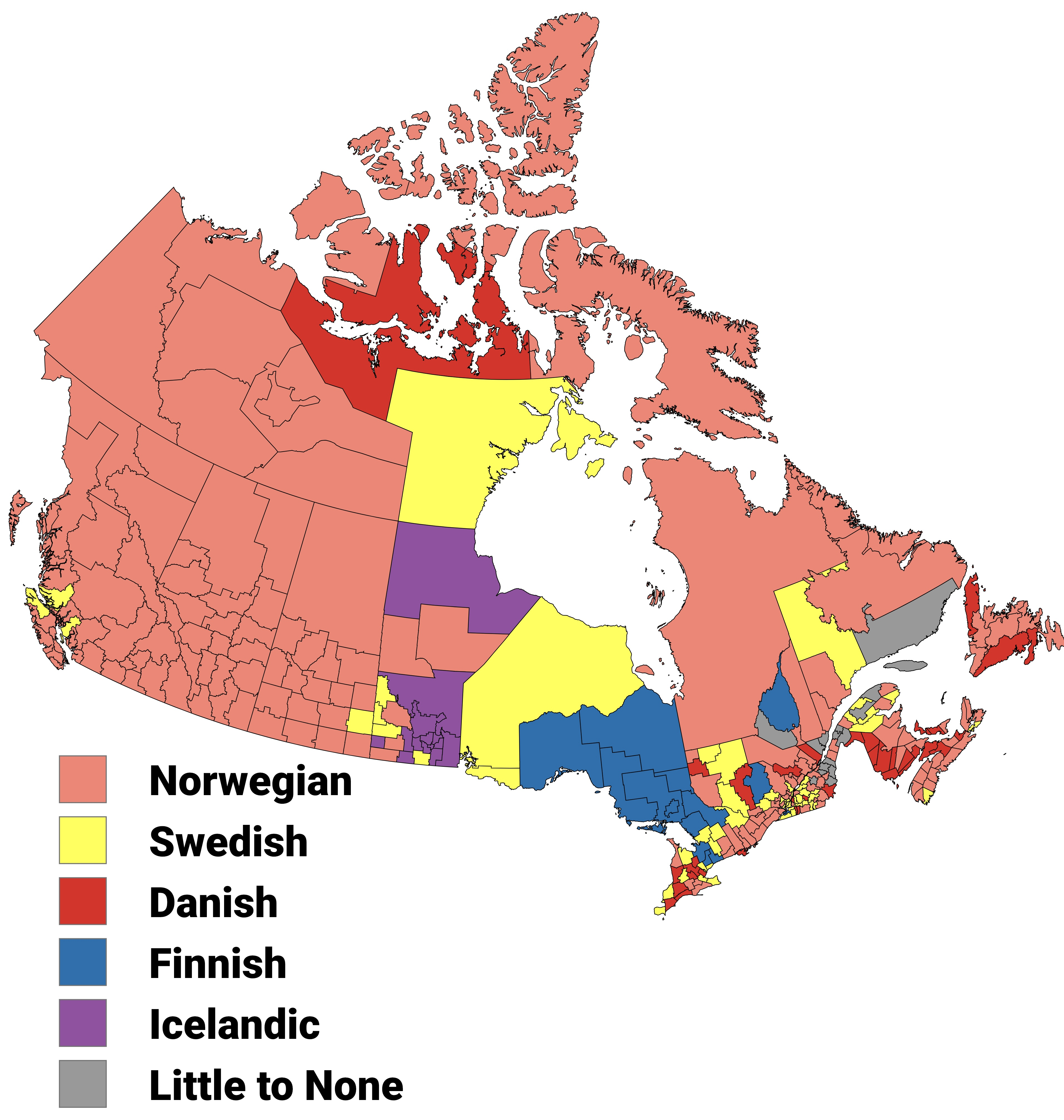
- Largest Nordic and Scandinavian ethnic origin in Canada by census division, 2021 census

Total population
- 1,201,315; 3.5% of the total Canadian population (2016)

Languages
- Canadian English, North Germanic languages, Finnish language

Religion
- Predominantly Lutheran; other Protestant denominations, Catholic

Related ethnic groups
- North Germanic peoples, Nordic and Scandinavian Americans

Nordic and Scandinavian Canadians are Canadian citizens with ancestral roots in the Nordic countries and/or Scandinavia

The highest concentration of Scandinavian Canadians is in Western Canada, especially British Columbia, Alberta and Saskatchewan.

As of the 2016 Canadian census, there are approximately 1.2 million Canadians of Nordic and Scandinavian descent, or about 3.49% of the total population of the country.

== Terminology ==
They generally include:

- (Denmark) Danish Canadians (Nordic and Scandinavian)
- (Norway) Norwegian Canadians (Nordic and Scandinavian)
- (Sápmi) Sami Canadians (Nordic)
- (Sweden) Swedish Canadians (Nordic and Scandinavian)
- (Finland) Finnish Canadians (Nordic)
- (Iceland) Icelandic Canadians (Nordic)

== History ==
Nordic & Scandinavian Canadian Population History
Year	Pop.	±%
1871	1,623	—
1881	5,223	+221.8%
1901	31,042	+494.3%
1911	112,682	+263.0%
1921	167,359	+48.5%
1931	228,049	+36.3%
1941	244,603	+7.3%
1951	283,024	+15.7%
1961	386,534	+36.6%
1971	384,795	−0.4%
1981	335,110	−12.9%
1986	690,925	+106.2%
1991	805,555	+16.6%
1996	917,185	+13.9%
2001	955,850	+4.2%
2006	1,120,805	+17.3%
2011	1,164,425	+3.9%
2016	1,201,315	+3.2%
Source: Statistics Canada Note: 1981 Canadian census did not include multiple ethnic origin responses, thus population is an undercount.

== See also ==
- European Canadians
- Vinland
- L'Anse aux Meadows
