= Scandinavians in Chicago =

Book by Erika K. Jackson

Scandinavians in Chicago: The Origins of White Privilege in Modern America
- Author: Erika K. Jackson
- Language: English
- Subject: American history, white supremacy
- Publisher: University of Illinois Press
- Publication date: 2019
- Publication place: United States
- Media type: Print
- Pages: 246
- ISBN: 0252042115

Scandinavians in Chicago: The Origins of White Privilege in Modern America is a 2019 non-fiction history book by Erika K. Jackson, published by University of Illinois Press.

The work describes how Scandinavian Americans were initially seen as not being at the top of the U.S. racial hierarchy but that this perception changed by the 1880s. The work describes how media by the 1920s promoted positive images of people of Scandinavian origins.

== Reception ==
Aleksi Huhta of the University of Turku described the book as "well-crafted and fascinating", though Huhta argued the book should have described links to the immigrants' mother countries and that not doing so results in a "lack of transnational sensibility."

Odd S. Lovoll of St. Olaf College described the book as "clearly a major scholarly work".

Benjamin R. Teitelbaum of the University of Colorado, Boulder wrote that "it is an understatement to say that Erika Jackson’s book fills an urgent void." However, he also noted that sometimes the book lacked footnotes or text detail supporting "many attributions of intentionality and of generality" and that "core claims are occasionally proclaimed rather than demonstrated".
