= Maligiaq Padilla =

Greenlandic canoeist

Maligiaq Johnsen Padilla (Greenlandic pronunciation: [maliʲijɑq jonˀsn padiɬɬa]) is a Greenlandic kayaker known for his skill with the sea kayak. In 1994, at the age of 12, he won every event in his age group at the National Kayaking Championship.

== History ==
Born in Greenland to an American father and a Greenlandic Inuk mother, Juliane Padilla (née Johnsen), he was raised from age 4 in Sisimiut. Padilla's grandfather, Peter Johnsen, taught him much of what he knows. A skilled kayaker in his own right, Johnsen taught Padilla how to kayak, how to build the boats and how to hunt using a harpoon and rifle. Included in his training were open-ocean skills and traditional kayak building skills. Kayaks built by Padilla are housed at the Greenland Sisimiut Museum, the Inuit Gallery of Vancouver the Smithsonian Museum in Washington DC and the Kativik Cultural Center in Nome.

Padilla lived in Alaska from 2010 to 2020, where he worked to revive traditional kayaking culture. He has two children who live there.

Padilla is the only person in history to win four Greenland National Kayaking Championships, winning his first title at 16.
