= Peter Bentzon =

American silversmith (1783–1850)

- Born: c. 1783; Saint Croix, Danish West Indies
- Died: c. 1850; Philadelphia, Pennsylvania
- Occupation: Silversmith

Peter Bentzon (c. 1783–c. 1850) was an American silversmith. He was one of the first known silversmiths in the United States who was of African descent. Some of Bentzon's silverwork has been identified, as he marked all his works with his initials.

== Biography ==
Peter Bentzon was born c. 1783 in Saint Croix in the Danish West Indies. He was born a free person of color. Bentzon's mother was a mulatto woman, and his father was white man who was surnamed Bentzon. He had fair skin complexion, which afforded him more opportunities and a larger social circle during this time. Bentzon apprenticed in silversmithing (c. 1791) and learned his trade in Saint Croix, U.S. Virgin Island; and in Philadelphia. A few years later he opened his own silver shop in Philadelphia. Bentzon's work can be found in public museum collections including the Philadelphia Museum of Art, the National Museum of African American History and Culture, Saint Louis Art Museum, the Colonial Williamsburg Foundation, the African American Museum, the Krannert Art Museum, and the Winterthur Museum.
