= Hanus Skálagarð =

- Born: 7 February 1924; Skúvoy, Faroe Islands
- Died: 3 March 2017 (aged 93); California, U.S.
- Citizenship: Faroese, later United States
- Education: Royal Danish Academy of Fine Arts
- Known for: Maritime painting
- Spouse: Mignon Diana Haack (m. 1955; died 2015)

Hanus Skálagarð, also known by the pseudonyms Hans Skalagard or Hans Skálagarð, (7 February 1924 – March 3, 2017) was a Faroese-American painter and merchant mariner. .

== Life ==
Hanus was born on Skálagarð farm in Skúvoy, Faroe Islands, and was the eldest of seven siblings. He began painting at the age of eight. Disliking farm life, Hanus decided early on to become a seafarer. In 1937, when he was just 13, he went to work as an apprentice fisherman aboard a four-masted bark in the Arctic Ocean fishing cod, a common path for boys his age in the Faroe Islands. On 8 September 1939, shortly after transferring from the Olivebank to a tanker, the old sailing vessel was struck by a mine in the North Sea and sank. Of its 21-man crew, only seven were rescued.

Hanus arrived in Boston, U.S., in 1942 at the age of 18. During World War II, he joined the Merchant navy and completed a total of 33 crossings of the North Atlantic. During the war, three of the ships he worked on were targeted and sunk by German submarines.

Hanus came to San Francisco in 1954 and met Mignon Haack, they married the following year and he became a naturalized U.S. citizen. His seafaring would come to an end in 1968 after some 31 years at sea.

== Works ==
Hanus and his wife, Mignon, owned and operated their own gallery, "Skalagard's Square-Rigger Art Gallery" in Carmel-by-the-sea, California, from 1965 until its closure in 1997.

During his long career he has produced around 3,500 oil works. Some of his works are displayed in the Monterey Maritime Museum, the Los Angeles County Maritime Museum, and the Santa Barbara Maritime Museum.
