= George Anderson (criminal) =

Danish-born criminal

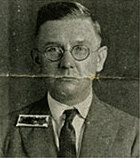
- Born: Ivan Dahl von Teler c. 1880
- Died: October 31, 1925; Muskegon, Michigan
- Other name: "Dutch"
- Status: Killed by police

George "Dutch" Anderson (born Ivan Dahl von Teler; c. 1880 – October 31, 1925) was a Danish-born criminal who helped lead an early Prohibition-era gang in the United States from 1919 until the mid-1920s. He was considered a mentor to his comrade Gerald Chapman, a famous American bandit of the 1920s.

== Life and career ==
Anderson was born Ivan Dahl von Teler to a wealthy Danish family circa 1880, Anderson graduated from the universities of Uppsala and Heidelberg studying music, literature and several languages before emigrating to the United States around the beginning of the 20th century. Although he attended the University of Wisconsin–Madison for a time, Anderson eventually dropped out and, by 1907 had begun committing petty thefts. He was in and out of prisons in Illinois, Ohio and Wisconsin until 1914.

In 1917, Anderson was arrested by police in Rochester, New York. Sentenced to five years for burglary in Auburn State Prison, Anderson became acquainted with bank robber Gerald Chapman. Influenced by the better-educated Anderson, the young Chapman became a voracious reader and self-styled gentleman, and was later known as the "Count of Gramercy Park".

Following both men's paroles in 1919, they began bootlegging operations in Toledo, Ohio and Detroit, Michigan.

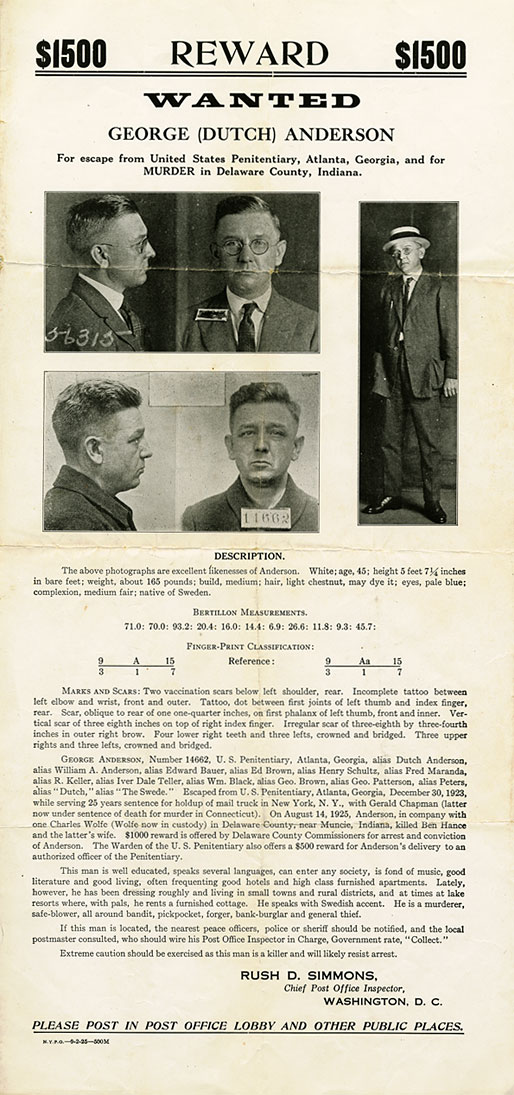
George "Dutch" Anderson Wanted poster

In late 1921, along with former Auburn inmate Charles Loeber, Anderson and Chapman began committing armed robberies. On October 21, the three men forced a U.S. Mail truck to stop at gunpoint on Leonard Street, taking with them $2.4 million in cash, bonds and jewelry.

The three men eluded identification for months. They were eventually arrested by United States Postal Inspectors William Doran, Jim Doyle and William Cochraine on July 3, 1922, after Chapman attempted to sell Argentine gold notes (stolen during the Leonard Street mail robbery) to an undercover Postal Inspector posing as a stock broker. Anderson and Chapman were both sentenced to 25 years at the Atlanta Federal Prison. Anderson escaped from the Atlanta prison on December 30, 1923, six months after Chapman's more dramatic escape from the same facility. They were believed to have teamed up again on several robberies.

Chapman, wanted in the killing of Connecticut police officer James Skelly, was recaptured on January 18, 1925, in Muncie, Indiana, due to a local informant Ben Hance. Both Hance and his wife were gunned down eight months later. Authorities saw the double murder as revenge by Anderson and his gang for Chapman's capture. An Anderson associate later served time for the slayings.

Through his passing of counterfeit money, Anderson was eventually traced to Muskegon, Michigan. On October 31, 1925, Police Officer Charles Hammond spotted him there, and the ensuing gunfight left both men dead.

Anderson's protégé, Chapman, was convicted of murder and was hanged in Connecticut in 1926.
