= Danish Canadians =

Ethnic group

Dansk-canadiere (Danish) Dano-canadiens (French)

Total population
- 207,470 (by ancestry, 2016 Census); 0.6% of Canada's population

Regions with significant populations
- Western Canada · Ontario

Languages
- English · French · Danish

Religion
- Traditionally Lutheranism

Related ethnic groups
- Danes · Greenlanders · Danish Americans

Danish Canadians (Danish: Dansk-canadiere) are Canadian citizens of Danish ancestry. According to the 2006 Census, there were 200,035 Canadians with Danish background, 17,650 of whom were born in Denmark.

Canada became an important destination for the Danes during the post-war period. At one point, a Canadian immigration office was to be set up in Copenhagen. While most of the post-war immigrants settled in large cities, Danish-Canadian communities can be found in all of Canada's ten provinces.

The oldest Danish community in Canada is New Denmark, New Brunswick, first inhabited by Danish immigrants in 1872.

== History ==
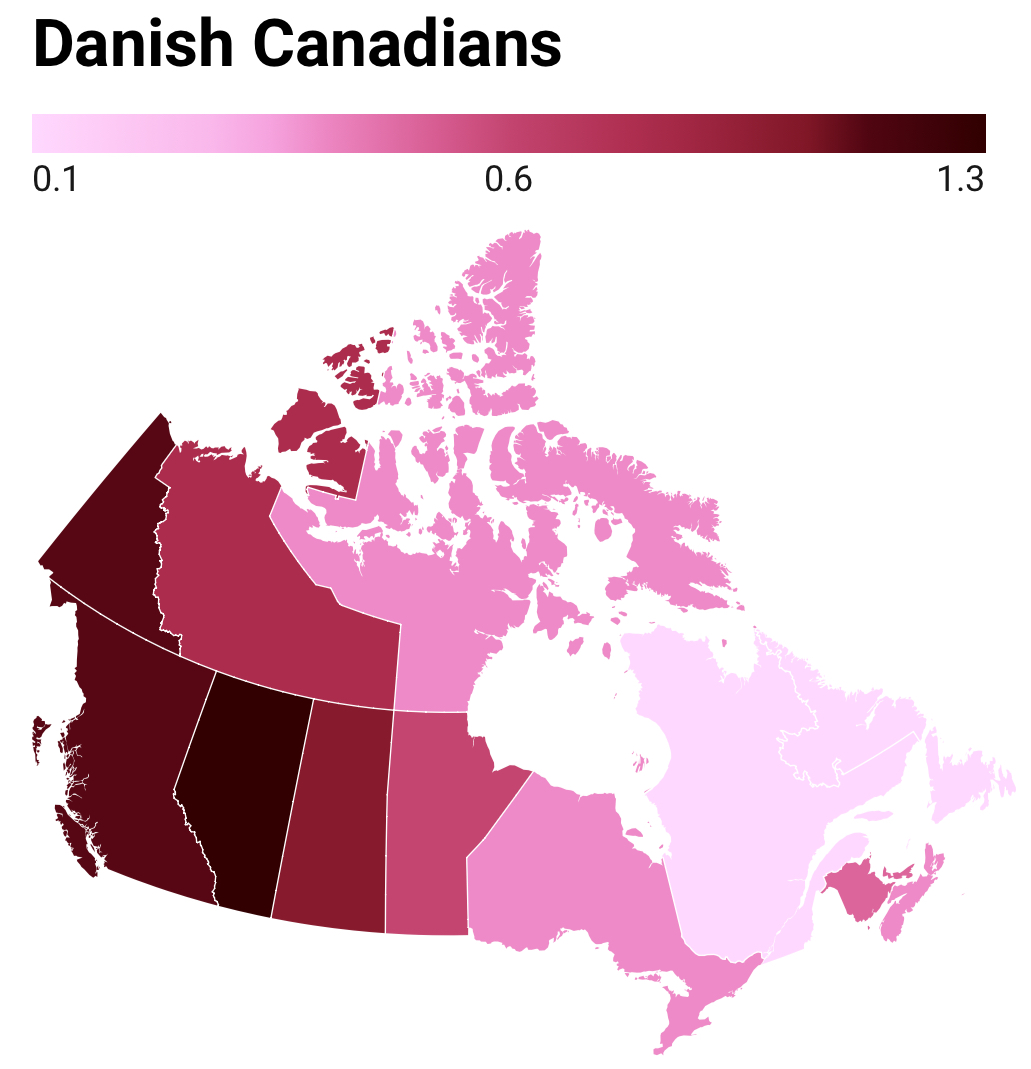
Danish percent in Canada by province/territory, 2021 census

Danish Canadian Population History
Year	Pop.	±%
1921	21,124	—
1931	34,118	+61.5%
1941	37,439	+9.7%
1951	42,671	+14.0%
1961	85,473	+100.3%
1971	75,725	−11.4%
1981	57,940	−23.5%
1986	119,055	+105.5%
1991	135,520	+13.8%
1996	163,125	+20.4%
2001	170,780	+4.7%
2006	200,035	+17.1%
2011	203,080	+1.5%
2016	207,470	+2.2%
Source: Statistics Canada Note: 1981 Canadian census did not include multiple ethnic origin responses, thus population is an undercount.

== Notable Danish Canadians ==
- Earl W. Bascom – rodeo pioneer, artist, inventor, actor, Canada's Sports Hall of Fame inductee
- Karen Bulow – textile artist
- Erik Christensen – NHL player from the New York Rangers
- Hayden Christensen – actor (Danish paternal grandparents)
- Scott Frandsen – Olympic athlete
- Ann Hansen – former anarchist
- Glenna Hansen – Inuvialuit politician
- Rick Hansen – paraplegic athlete
- Jens Haven – Missionary and Settler
- Valdy/Valdemar Horsdal – Singer-Songwriter
- Carly Rae Jepsen – pop singer
- K.V. Johansen – writer
- Rasmus Lerdorf – programmer
- Erik Nielsen – Deputy Prime Minister of Canada from 1984 to 1986
- Leslie Nielsen – actor and comedian (Danish father)
- Robert Nielsen – journalist
- Kaj Pindal – animator and animation educator
- Alf Erling Porsild – botanist
- Luke Skaarup – strength athlete, strongman
- Lauren Southern – political activist (Danish father)

== See also ==
- Canada–Denmark relations
- Danish Americans
- Danish diaspora
- European Canadians
- Finnish Canadians
- Icelandic Canadians
- Nordic and Scandinavian Canadians
- Norwegian Canadians
- Swedish Canadians
