= Nordic and Scandinavian Americans =

Ethnic group

Nordic Americans Scandinavian Americans
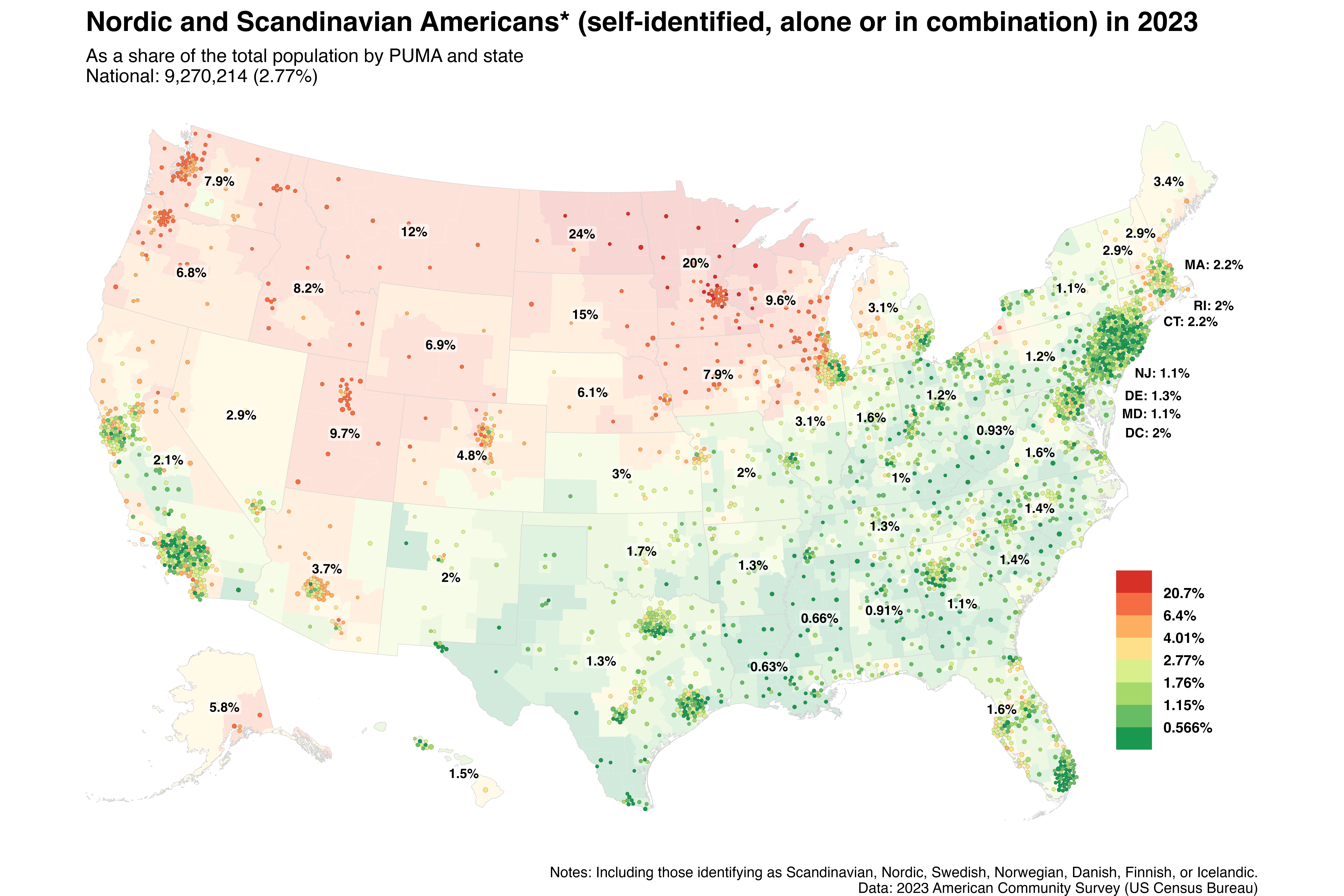

Total population
- 10,365,489 (2.8%) alone or in combination 3,419,197 (1.0%) Nordic or Scandinavian alone 2021 estimates, self-reported

Regions with significant populations
- Minnesota: 1,603,124
- California: 1,224,541
- Washington: 739,043
- Wisconsin: 728,248
- Illinois: 575,991
- Michigan: 403,888
- Florida: 355,458
- Oregon: 339,031
- Iowa: 338,161
- Utah: 333,405

Languages
- American English; Swedish; Danish; Norwegian; Sámi; Finnish; North Germanic languages

Religion
- 61% Protestant (predominantly Lutheran), 22% Catholic, 14% other (no religion, Mormonism, etc.)

Related ethnic groups
- Other North Germanic peoples • other Finns • Estonian Americans • Inuit • Sámi Americans

Nordic and Scandinavian Americans are Americans of Scandinavian and/or Nordic ancestry, including Danish Americans (estimate: 1,453,897), Faroese Americans, Finnish Americans (estimate: 653,222), Greenlandic Americans, Icelandic Americans (estimate: 49,442), Norwegian Americans (estimate: 4,602,337), and Swedish Americans (estimate: 4,293,208). Also included are persons who reported 'Scandinavian' ancestry (estimate: 582,549) on their census. According to 2021 census estimates, there are approximately 9,365,489 people of Scandinavian ancestry in the United States.

Norsemen had explored the eastern coast of North America as early as the 11th century, though they created no lasting settlements. Later, a Swedish colony briefly existed on the Delaware River during the 17th century. The vast majority of Americans of Nordic or Scandinavian ancestry, however, are descended from immigrants of the 19th century. This era saw mass emigration from Scandinavia following a population increase that the region's existing infrastructure could not support. Many prevailing traditions observed by Nordic and Scandinavian Americans are from this era, and are reflective of the lifestyle of rural immigrant communities during the late 19th century.

== Terminology ==
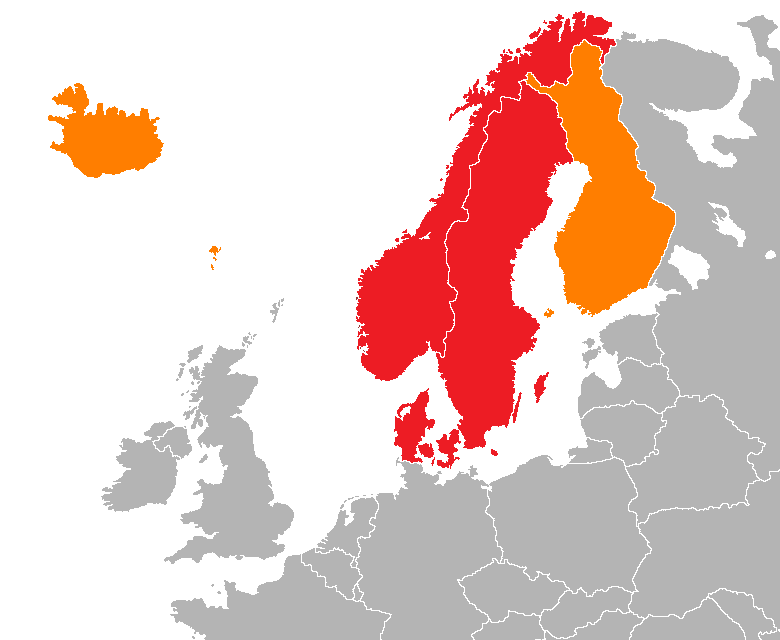
Map highlighting the Nordic Region (excluding Greenland), with the three Scandinavian countries highlighted in red.

The terms Scandinavian and Nordic are closely related and often erroneously used interchangeably. The Nordic countries are a geographic region which consists of Sweden, Norway, Denmark, Greenland, the Faroe Islands, Iceland, Finland, and Åland. Though these regions have a shared cultural history, they contain culturally distinct historical populations, including the Sámi people and the Norse people.

By contrast, the term Scandinavia more selectively refers to just Denmark, Norway and Sweden, although other Nordic countries are sometimes included within this definition. The joint ruling of Denmark and Norway from the mid-14th century until 1814, and then the joint rule of Sweden and Norway until 1905, have contributed towards a closely allied culture. These three countries also share mutually intelligible languages, as they are all descended from Old Norse. Faroese and Icelandic are also descendent of Old Norse, though they have kept more of the old Norse grammar and spelling, while the peninsular Scandinavian languages have undergone more or less the same simplifications and are mutually intelligible and readable. The degree of ease with which people understand each other, however, varies depending on country and region of origin.

== History ==
=== Early settlements ===
By the 11th century, Norsemen had established a presence in Iceland and Greenland, in close proximity to continental North America. Several expeditions were made to what they called Vinland, near Newfoundland and Labrador. Although this was the most significant pre-Columbian contact with North America by Europeans, no lasting settlements were made.

During the mid 17th century, Sweden established a short-lived colony along the Delaware River called New Sweden. Despite its short history, the Nordic settlers are credited with having a lasting impact on colonial practice in the region. Swedish colonists likely introduced the construction of log cabins to North America, although some historians argue they were of later German or Swiss origin. Additionally, it has been proposed that Finnish colonists had a lasting impact on the region's use of forested areas. The colony was conquered by the Dutch in 1655 and subsequently dismantled. Despite its dissolution, Swedish and Finnish colonists remained the majority European population in the area. Swedish authorities retained some autonomy under the Dutch administration. By the mid-1660s however, the English outnumbered both the Dutch and Swedish, eventually becoming the dominant force in the area. The fate of the original Swedish and Finnish colonists is largely lost to history. It is believed that some moved west and settled among native populations, while others assimilated within the English regime.

=== Nordic immigration ===
Early groups of Scandinavian immigrants to the United States had been motivated by religious factors, namely small communities of religious minorities who left to break from Lutheran state churches. Although small numbers of Scandinavian immigrants had already established themselves in the United States, the largest number immigrated during the 19th century in response to population increases across Scandinavia. During the 19th century, the population of Denmark, Norway, and Sweden collectively tripled. This increase was likely caused by improved medical and agricultural practices, and the unusually peaceful era in the region which followed the Napoleonic Wars. As a result, mortality rates dropped, while the birth rate continued to be high. The region's existing infrastructure could not support such extreme growth. In particular, population growth strained the resources of rural populations, where usable land was already limited. With more children to support, farms were successively split into smaller plots to be divided among descendants, and families were increasingly unable to sustain themselves from their own land. This forced many people in rural communities into poverty. Some chose to migrate to urban areas, in turn increasing unemployment. A later recession during the 1860s and famine further drove Scandinavians to emigrate. Although immigration to the United States decreased during the American Civil War, a significant wave again left during the 1880s. By the 1920s, the number of Scandinavian immigrants had decreased greatly, stopping almost entirely during the Great Depression.

Between 1825 and 1930, approximately three million Scandinavians emigrated, over 95 percent of which moved to the United States. It is estimated that this group comprised 1.2 million Swedes, 850,000 Norwegians, and 300,000 Danes. Initially, it was common for families to relocate as a whole unit and settle in the rural areas, most often in the Midwest. This shifted by the late 1800s, which saw more unmarried individuals immigrate to urban areas. They were often followed by other members of their family once they had financially established themselves. Similarly through chain migration, immigrants often settled near those they already knew from their country of origin. This led to distinct communities of Danes, Swedes, and Norwegians that expressed regional differences.

While some immigrants quickly assimilated, many of the resulting insular rural communities remained culturally distinct. They established their own churches, newspapers, and schools in their native language and in accordance to their traditions. Institutions like these helped preserve their cultural identity, though over time these communities began to assimilate. Their identity came to be more homogeneously Scandinavian, rather than defined exclusively by their ancestral country. This paralleled global conceptions of Scandinavism, as different nationalities were led to work together by proximity.

Following World War II, there was an increase in interest in ethnic origins in the United States, which saw more Scandinavian Americans refer to themselves as Norwegian-American, Danish-American, etc. Remaining communities became concerned with cultural activism and preservationism. These efforts often centered around church congregations and societies, such as the Sons of Norway and the Swedish–American Historical Society. Although use of Nordic languages has largely died out among descendants of the 19th century, Scandinavian identity has been maintained, especially in rural communities.

=== Finnish immigration ===
The majority of immigrants from Finland came to the United States in the late 19th and early 20th century. Today the Finnish-American population numbers about 650,000. Many immigrated to the Upper Peninsula of Michigan and the Iron Range of northern Minnesota to work in the mining industry; much of the population in these regions remains of Finnish descent.

=== Icelandic immigration ===
Icelandic immigrants came to the United States primarily in the period 1873–1905 and after World War II. According to 2019 estimates, there are approximately 49,400 Icelandic Americans in the U.S. Most live in the Upper Midwest. The United States is home to the second largest Icelandic diaspora community in the world after Canada.

=== Sámi immigration ===
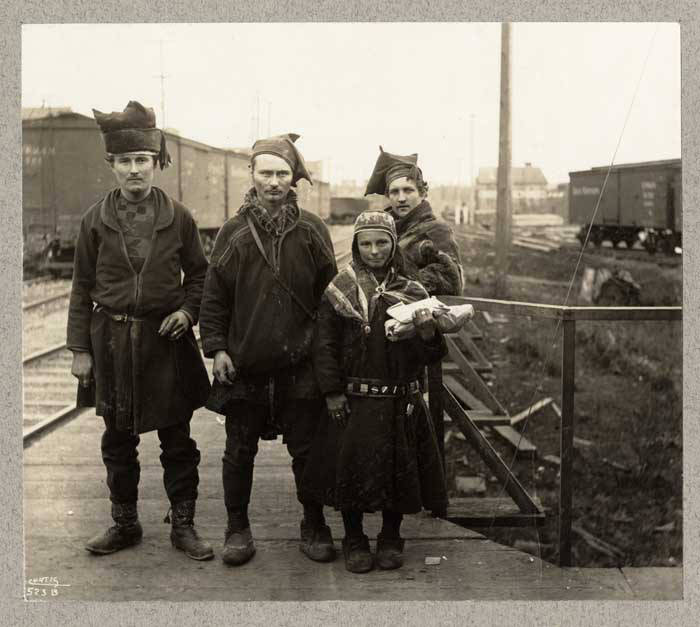
Group of Sámi reindeer herders, 1898, Seattle.

Following the dramatic increase of immigrants to Alaska during the 1890s gold rush, the Alaska government was tasked with finding ways to sustain a population which was unprepared for the harshness of the climate. In the 1890s, it recruited approximately a hundred Sámi to introduce reindeer herding. However, the Reindeer Act of 1937 made ownership of Reindeer by non-Alaskan Natives illegal and most Sámi left Alaska.

An estimated 30,000 people of Sami ancestry live in North America. A small Sámi community on the Kitsap Peninsula near Seattle continues to preserve Sámi-American culture.

== Culture ==
=== Holidays ===
Leif Erikson Day, Leif Erikson is celebrated as the first European to land a voyage in North America.

=== Music ===
"Oleanna" is a Scandinavian-American folk song.

== Demographics ==
=== Scandinavian Americans by state ===
State	Scandinavian Americans	Percent Scandinavian Americans	Scandinavian language speakers	Percent speakers
United States	11,269,320	3.8%	200,630	0.0%
Minnesota	1,580,776	32.1%	17,998	0.3%
California	1,510,541	3.6%	32,745	0.1%
Washington	739,043	12.5%	12,524	0.2%
Wisconsin	728,248	13.5%	6,929	0.2%
Illinois	575,991	4.6%	7,528	0.0%
Michigan	403,888	4.0%	8,825	0.0%
Texas	359,360	1.4%	7,849	0.0%
Florida	355,458	2.1%	14,628	0.0%
Oregon	339,031	9.9%	4,510	0.1%
Iowa	338,161	11.5%	2,407	0.0%
Utah	333,405	14.9%	3,838	0.1%
Colorado	291,488	5.9%	-	-
Arizona	281,388	4.3%	-	-
New York	254,474	1.3%	13,543	0.0%
North Dakota	231,875	36.1%	3,364	0.5%
Massachusetts	182,339	2.8%	6,599	0.1%
Nebraska	177,522	9.9%	-	-
South Dakota	172,941	21.5%	-	-
Pennsylvania	169,294	1.3%	-	-
Ohio	164,005	1.4%	-	-
Montana	136,688	14.1%	-	-
Idaho	136,620	8.9%	-	-
Missouri	135,340	2.2%	-	-
Virginia	130,099	1.6%	-	-
Kansas	124,017	4.4%	-	-
New Jersey	119,267	1.3%	5,518	0.0%
Indiana	118,989	1.8%	-	-
North Carolina	110,362	1.1%	-	-
Nevada	102,638	3.9%	-	-
Connecticut	100,530	2.8%	-	-
Georgia	97,209	1.0%	-	-
Maryland	79,656	1.4%	-	-
Tennessee	75,615	1.2%	-	-
Oklahoma	62,145	1.7%	-	-
Alaska	61,259	8.9%	-	-
Wyoming	51,755	9.7%	-	-
New Hampshire	47,955	3.6%	-	-
Maine	44,955	3.4%	-	-
Alabama	43,899	0.9%	-	-
South Carolina	43,306	0.9%	-	-
New Mexico	41,073	2.0%	-	-
Arkansas	38,308	1.3%	-	-
Kentucky	34,592	0.8%	-	-
Hawaii	30,976	2.4%	-	-
Louisiana	29,175	0.6%	-	-
Rhode Island	26,476	2.5%	-	-
Mississippi	19,501	0.6%	-	-
Vermont	18,378	2.9%	-	-
West Virginia	14,519	0.8%	-	-
Delaware	11,232	1.2%	-	-
District of Columbia	7,523	1.3%	-	-
Puerto Rico	641	0.0%	-	-

== See also ==
- Nordic Americans in New York City
- Scandinavian diaspora
- Danish Americans
- Faroese Americans
- Finnish Americans
  - Findians
- Greenlandic Americans
- Icelandic Americans
- Norwegian Americans
- Sámi Americans
- Swedish Americans
