= Danes =

Ethnic group native to Denmark

Danskere (Danish)

Total population
- c. 8 million

Regions with significant populations
- Denmark: 5,961,249
- United States: 1,430,897
- Canada: 207,470
- Australia: 65,529
- Norway: 52,510
- Brazil: 52,000
- Germany: 50,000
- Argentina: 48,000
- Sweden: 42,602
- United Kingdom: 18,493 (Danish born only)
- Spain: 10,000
- France: 7,000
- Switzerland: 4,251
- Iceland: 4,214
- New Zealand: 3,507
- Turkey: 3,382
- Italy: 2,084
- Portugal: 1,528
- Austria: 1,281
- Peru: 162
- Ireland: 809
- Lebanon: 400

Languages
- Danish

Religion
- Lutheranism (Church of Denmark); Further details: Religion in Denmark

Related ethnic groups
- Other North Germanic peoples, especially Swedes

Danes (Danish: danskere, pronounced [ˈtænskɐɐ]), or Danish people, are an ethnic group and nationality native to Denmark and a modern nation identified with the country of Denmark. This connection may be ancestral, legal, historical, or cultural.

== History ==
=== Early history ===
Denmark has been inhabited by various Germanic peoples since ancient times, including the Angles, Cimbri, Jutes, Herules, Teutones and others. A 2025 study in Nature found genetic evidence of an influx of central European population after about 500 ce into the region later ruled by the Danes.

=== Viking Age ===
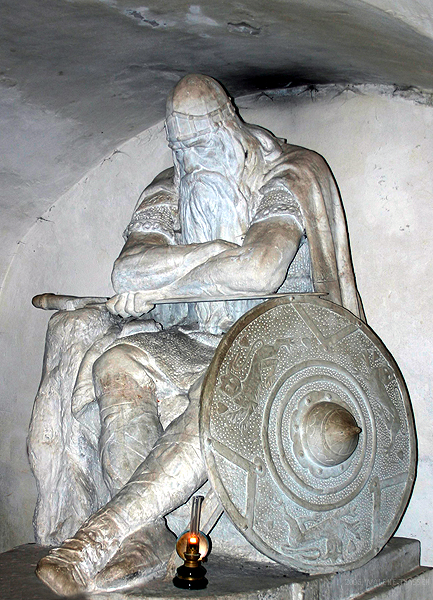
Ogier the Dane (Holger Danske) at Kronborg Castle is an important national icon from the Viking age.

The first mention of Danes within Denmark is on the Jelling Rune Stone, which mentions the conversion of the Danes to Christianity by Harald Bluetooth in the 10th century. Between c. 960 and the early 980s, Bluetooth established a kingdom in the lands of the Danes, stretching from Jutland to Scania. Around the same time, he received a visit from a German missionary who, by surviving an ordeal by fire according to legend, convinced Harold to convert to Christianity.

The following years saw the Danish Viking expansion, which incorporated Norway and England into the Danish North Sea Empire. After the death of Canute the Great in 1035, England broke away from Danish control. Canute's nephew Sweyn Estridson (1020–1074) re-established strong royal Danish authority and built a good relationship with the archbishop of Bremen, at that time the archbishop of all Scandinavia. Over the next centuries, the Danish empire expanded throughout the southern Baltic coast. Under the 14th century king Olaf II, Denmark acquired control of the Kingdom of Norway, which included the territories of Norway, Iceland and the Faroese Islands. Olaf's mother, Margrethe I, united Norway, Sweden and Denmark into the Kalmar Union.

=== Denmark–Norway ===
Map of Denmark–Norway, c. 1780

In 1523, Sweden won its independence, leading to the dismantling of the Kalmar Union and the establishment of Denmark–Norway. Denmark–Norway grew wealthy during the 16th century, largely because of the increased traffic through the Øresund. The Crown of Denmark could tax the traffic, because it controlled both sides of the Sound at the time.

The Reformation, which originated in the German lands in the early 16th century from the ideas of Martin Luther (1483–1546), had a considerable impact on Denmark. The Danish Reformation started in the mid-1520s. Some Danes wanted access to the Bible in their own language. In 1524, Hans Mikkelsen and Christiern Pedersen translated the New Testament into Danish; it became an instant best-seller. Those who had traveled to Wittenberg in Saxony and come under the influence of the teachings of Luther and his associates included Hans Tausen, a Danish monk in the Order of St John Hospitallers.

In the 17th century Denmark–Norway colonized Greenland.

After a failed war with the Swedish Empire, the Treaty of Roskilde in 1658 removed the areas of the Scandinavian Peninsula from Danish control, thus establishing the boundaries between Norway, Denmark, and Sweden that exist to this day. In the centuries after this loss of territory, the populations of the Scanian lands, who had previously been considered Danish, came to be fully integrated as Swedes.

In the early 19th century, Denmark suffered a defeat in the Napoleonic Wars; Denmark lost control over Norway and territories in what is now northern Germany. The political and economic defeat ironically sparked what is known as the Danish Golden Age during which a Danish national identity first came to be fully formed. The Danish liberal and national movements gained momentum in the 1830s, and after the European revolutions of 1848 Denmark became a constitutional monarchy on 5 June 1849. The growing bourgeoisie had demanded a share in government, and in an attempt to avert the sort of bloody revolution occurring elsewhere in Europe, Frederick VII gave in to the demands of the citizens. A new constitution emerged, separating the powers and granting the franchise to all adult males, as well as freedom of the press, religion, and association. The king became head of the executive branch.

== Identity ==
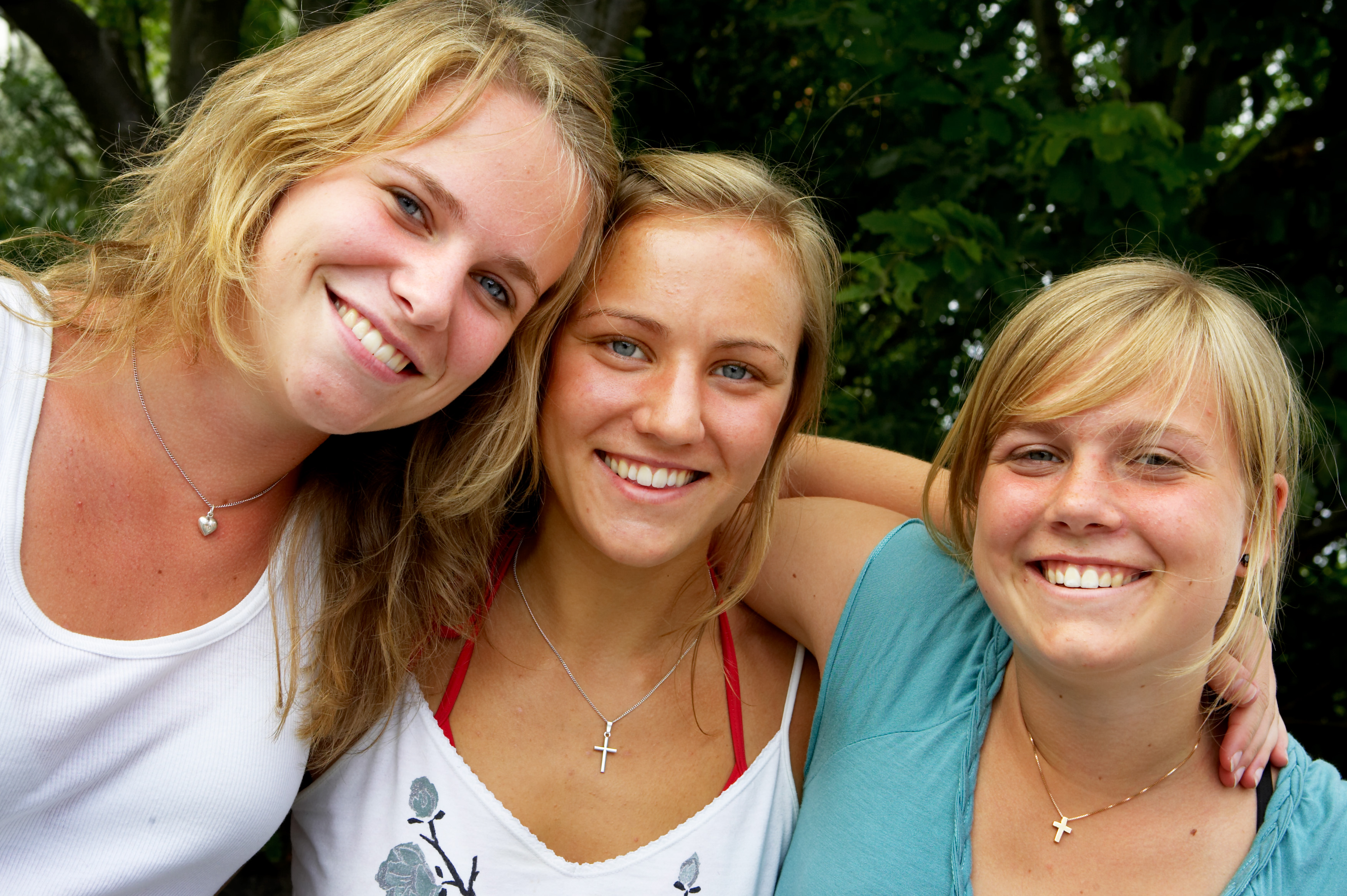
Girls from Denmark

Danishness (danskhed) is the concept on which contemporary Danish national and ethnic identity is based. It is a set of values formed through the historic trajectory of the formation of the Danish nation. The ideology of Danishness emphasizes the notion of historical connection between the population and the territory of Denmark and the relation between the thousand-year-old Danish monarchy and the modern Danish state, the 19th-century national romantic idea of "the people" (folk), a view of Danish society as homogeneous and socially egalitarian as well as strong cultural ties to other Scandinavian nations.

Importantly, since its formulation, Danish identity has not been linked to a particular racial or biological heritage, as many other ethno-national identities have. N. F. S. Grundtvig, for example, emphasized the Danish language and the emotional relation to and identification with the nation of Denmark as the defining criteria of Danishness. This cultural definition of ethnicity has been suggested to be one of the reasons that Denmark was able to integrate their earliest ethnic minorities of Jewish and Polish origins into the Danish ethnic group with much more success than neighboring Germany. Jewishness was not seen as being incompatible with a Danish ethnic identity, as long as the most important cultural practices and values were shared. This inclusive ethnicity has in turn been described as the background for the relative lack of virulent antisemitism in Denmark and the rescue of the Danish Jews, saving 99% of Denmark's Jewish population from the Holocaust.

Modern Danish cultural identity is rooted in the birth of the Danish national state during the 19th century. In this regard, Danish national identity was built on a basis of peasant culture and Lutheran theology, with Grundtvig and his popular movement playing a prominent part in the process. Two defining cultural criteria of being Danish were speaking the Danish language and identifying Denmark as a homeland.

The ideology of Danishness has been politically important in the formulation of Danish political relations with the EU, which has been met with considerable resistance in the Danish population, and in recent reactions in the Danish public to the increasing influence of immigration.

== Diaspora ==
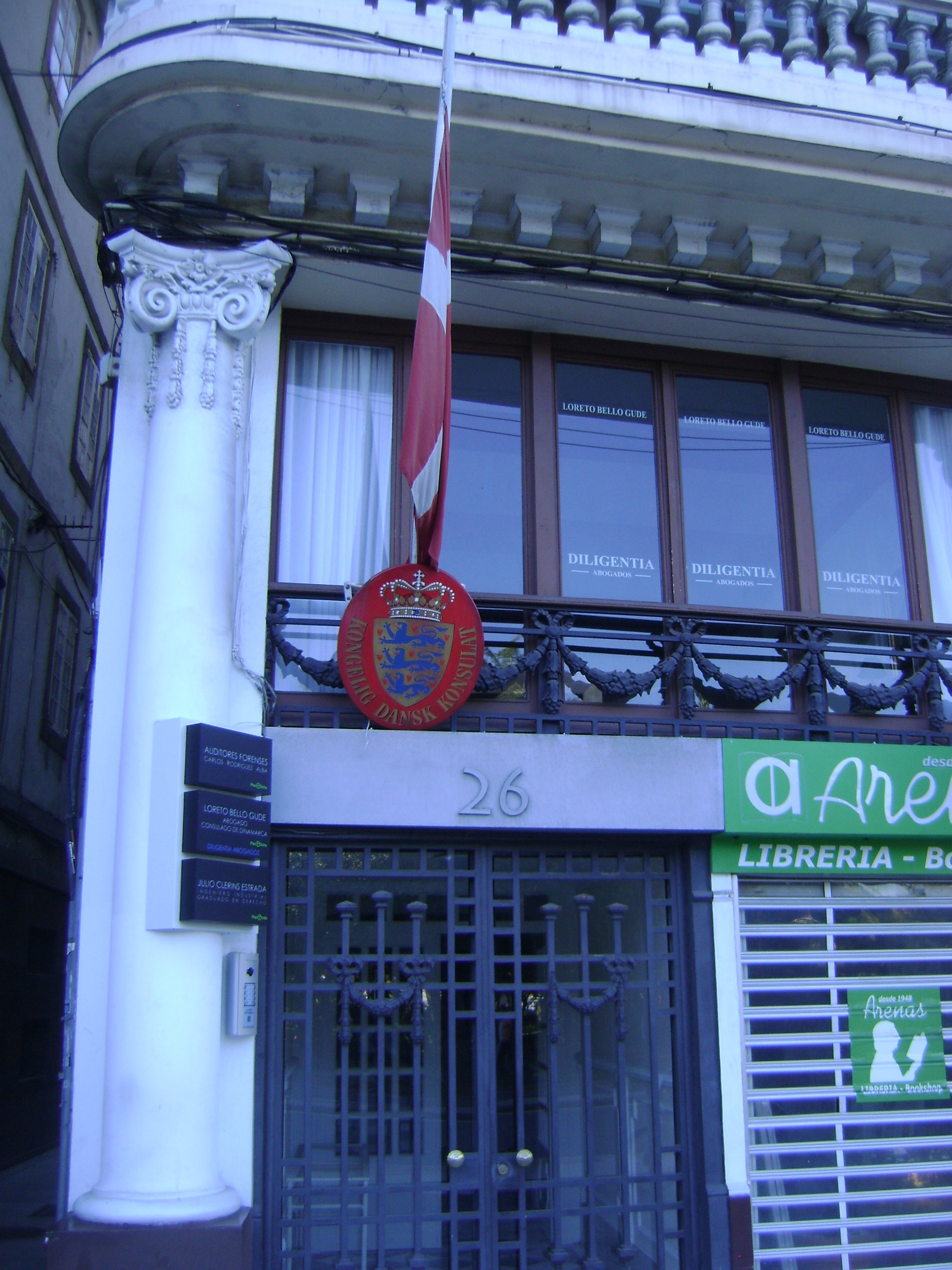
Danish consulate in Coruña, (Spain)

The Danish diaspora consists of emigrants and their descendants, especially those who maintain some of the customs of their Danish culture. A minority of approximately fifty thousand Danish-identifying German citizens live in the former Danish territory of Southern Schleswig (Sydslesvig), now located within the borders of Germany, forming around ten percent of the local population. In Denmark, the latter group is often referred to as "Danes south of the border" (De danske syd for grænsen), the "Danish-minded" (de dansksindede), or simply "South Schleswigers". Due to immigration there are considerable populations with Danish roots outside Denmark in countries such as the United States, Brazil, Canada, Greenland, Peru and Argentina.

Danish Americans (Dansk-amerikanere) are Americans of Danish descent. There are approximately 1,500,000 Americans of Danish origin or descent. Most Danish-Americans live in the Western United States or the Midwestern United States. California has the largest population of people of Danish descent in the United States. Notable Danish communities in the United States are located in Solvang, California, and Racine, Wisconsin, but these populations are not considered to be Danes for official purposes by the Danish government, and heritage alone can not be used to claim Danish citizenship, as it can in some European nations.

According to the 2006 Census, there were 200,035 Canadians with Danish background, 17,650 of whom were born in Denmark. Canada became an important destination for the Danes during the post war period. At one point, a Canadian immigration office was to be set up in Copenhagen.

In Greenland, a self-governing territory under Danish sovereignty, there are approximately 6,348 Danish Greenlanders making up roughly 11% of the territory's population.

In South America, we find Danish clusters in countries such as Argentina, and Peru. In the case of Argentina, the main cities where Danes settled were called the "triangle": Tandil, Necochea, and Tres Arroyos. In Peru, although the migration was significantly smaller we do find a sizable amount of Danes and people of Danish descent in Lima. The Rasmussen family, with their founder Jorgen Rasmussen who moved to Peru in 1864. He is known for his contributions to the building of the electrical system in the country. In commemoration for his contributions, a plaque hangs in the administrative buildings of the country's electrical headquarters.

== Genetics ==
The most common Y-DNA haplogroups among Danes are R1b (37.3%) and I1 (32.8%).

== See also ==
- Demographics of Denmark
- List of Danes
- Culture of Denmark
- History of Denmark

== Sources ==
- Waldman, Carl; Mason, Catherine (2006). Encyclopedia of European Peoples. Infobase Publishing. ISBN 978-1-4381-2918-1.
