= Demographics of Greenland =

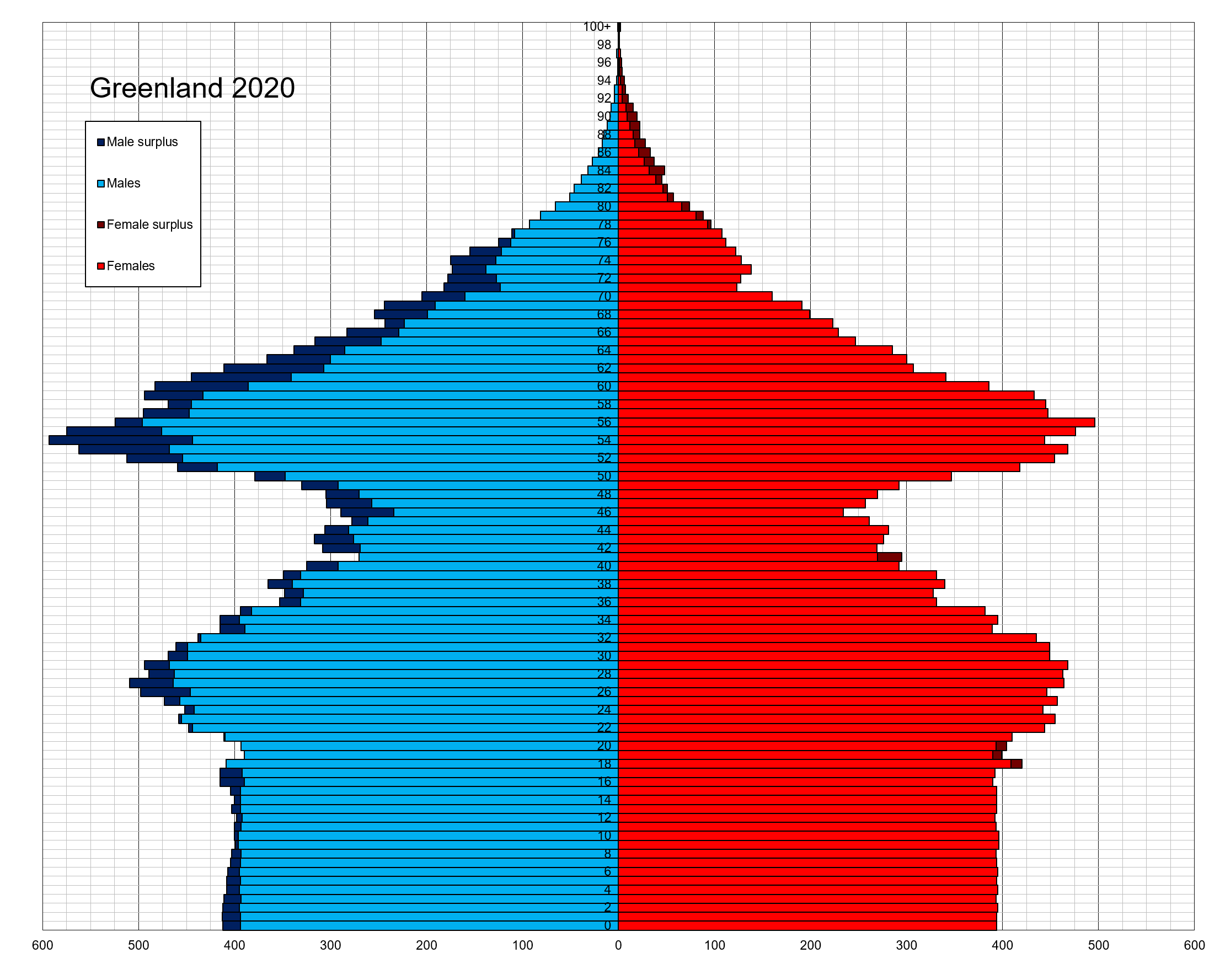
- Population pyramid of Greenland in 2020
- Population: 57,792 (2022 est.)
- Growth rate: -0.02% (2022 est.)
- Birth rate: 13.79 births/1,000 population (2022 est.)
- Death rate: 8.96 deaths/1,000 population (2022 est.)
- Life expectancy: 73.98 years
  - male: 71.28 years
  - female: 76.82 years
- Fertility rate: 1.91 children born/woman (2022 est.)
- Infant mortality: 8.75 deaths/1,000 live births
- Net migration rate: -5 migrant(s)/1,000 population (2022 est.)
- Immigrant share: 10.4% (2024)

Age structure
- 0–14 years: 20.82%
- 65 and over: 10.36%

Sex ratio
- Total: 1.08 male(s)/female (2022 est.)
- At birth: 1.05 male(s)/female
- Under 15: 1.03 male(s)/female
- 65 and over: 0.84 male(s)/female

Nationality
- Nationality: Greenlander

Language
- Official: Greenlandic
- Spoken: Greenlandic, Danish, English

This is a demography of the population of Greenland including population density, ethnicity, economic status, religious affiliations and other aspects of the population.

The demographics of Greenland is highly impacted by the rapid transformation from a hunter-gatherer to a post-industrial society in the 20th century. This transformation resulted in Greenland undergoing a demographic transition, with a significant population increase as a result.

This rocketing of the population caused Danish authorities to implement a highly controversial IUD program, known as the Spiral case in the 1960s and 70s.

== Populations ==
As of 1 January 2024 the resident population of Greenland was estimated to be 56,699, an increase of 90 (0.2%) from the previous year.

Population by municipality on 1 January 2024
Municipality	Population	% of total	Annual change
Kommuneqarfik Sermersooq	24,382	43.00%	▲ +234 (+1.0%)
Avannaata Kommunia	10,846	19.13%	▼ −74 (−0.7%)
Qeqqata Kommunia	9,204	16.23%	▲ +13 (+0.1%)
Kommune Kujalleq	6,145	10.84%	▼ −60 (−1.0%)
Kommune Qeqertalik	6,058	10.68%	▼ −24 (−0.4%)

Values do not sum to 100% because there were 64 inhabitants living outside the five municipalities; this includes residents in the unincorporated Northeast Greenland National Park. Nuuk is the most populous locality in Greenland with 19,872 inhabitants, which is about 35% of Greenland's total population.

=== Structure of the population ===
Population Estimates by Sex and Age Group (01.VII.2013) (Population statistics are compiled from registers.):

Age group	Male	Female	Total	%
Total	29 867	26 616	56 483	100
0–4	2 142	1 930	4 072	7.21
5–9	2 004	1 942	3 946	6.99
10–14	2 088	2 022	4 110	7.28
15–19	2 130	2 111	4 241	7.51
20–24	2 350	2 283	4 633	8.20
25–29	2 159	2 081	4 240	7.51
30–34	1 954	1 864	3 818	6.76
35–39	1 730	1 440	3 170	5.61
40–44	2 008	1 690	3 698	6.55
45–49	2 980	2 537	5 517	9.77
50–54	2 599	2 123	4 722	8.36
55–59	2 092	1 546	3 638	6.44
60–64	1 425	1 036	2 461	4.36
65–69	1 071	731	1 802	3.19
70–74	629	594	1 223	2.17
75–79	319	365	684	1.21
80–84	143	229	372	0.66
85–89	39	80	119	0.21
90–94	4	10	14	0.02
95–99	1	2	3	<0.01
Age group	Male	Female	Total	Percent
0–14	6 234	5 894	12 128	21.47
15–64	21 427	18 711	40 138	71.06
65+	2 206	2 011	4 217	7.47

Population Estimates by Sex and Age Group (01.VII.2021) (Population statistics are compiled from registers.):

Age group	Male	Female	Total	%
Total	29 855	26 798	56 653	100
0–4	2 058	1 987	4 045	7.14
5–9	1 994	1 855	3 849	6.79
10–14	1 991	1 840	3 831	6.76
15–19	1 851	1 760	3 611	6.37
20–24	1 972	1 943	3 915	6.91
25–29	2 363	2 268	4 631	8.17
30–34	2 398	2 338	4 736	8.36
35–39	2 096	1 902	3 998	7.06
40–44	1 793	1 517	3 310	5.84
45–49	1 630	1 289	2 919	5.15
50–54	2 215	1 922	4 137	7.30
55–59	2 577	2 174	4 751	8.39
60–64	2 108	1 615	3 723	6.57
65–69	1 285	992	2 277	4.02
70–74	776	618	1 394	2.46
75–79	485	433	918	1.62
80–84	194	219	413	0.73
85–89	52	92	144	0.25
90–94	13	29	42	0.07
95+	4	5	9	0.02
Age group	Male	Female	Total	Percent
0–14	6 043	5 682	11 725	20.70
15–64	20 886	18 728	39 614	69.92
65+	2 926	2 388	5 314	9.38

== Vital statistics ==
Year	Average population	Live births	Deaths	Natural change	Crude birth rate (per 1000)	Crude death rate (per 1000)	Natural change (per 1000)	Total fertility rate	Infant mortality rate
1900	12,000	416	306	110	35.6	26.2	9.4		
1901	12,000	461	301	160	38.7	25.3	13.4		
1902	12,000	426	259	167	35.5	21.6	13.9		
1903	12,000	428	327	101	35.1	26.8	8.3		
1904	12,000	535	283	252	43.5	23.0	20.5		
1905	13,000	487	292	195	39.0	23.4	15.6		
1906	13,000	493	366	127	39.1	29.0	10.1		
1907	13,000	476	362	114	37.2	28.3	8.9		
1908	13,000	543	378	165	42.1	29.3	12.8		
1909	13,000	564	448	116	43.1	34.2	8.9		
1910	13,000	443	354	89	33.6	26.8	6.7		
1911	13,000	577	562	15	43.1	41.9	1.1		
1912	14,000	482	389	93	35.7	28.8	6.9		
1913	14,000	592	390	202	43.5	28.7	14.9		
1919	14,000	531	458	73	38.8	33.4	5.3		
1915	14,000	545	428	117	39.8	31.2	8.5		
1916	14,000	545	447	98	39.5	32.4	7.1		
1917	14,000	547	312	235	39.4	22.4	16.9		
1918	14,000	550	328	222	39.3	23.4	15.9		
1919	14,000	510	614	−104	36.2	43.5	−7.4		
1920	14,000	569	429	140	40.1	30.2	9.9		
1921	14,000	610	565	45	42.7	39.5	3.1		
1922	15,000	545	396	149	37.3	27.1	10.2		
1923	15,000	563	326	237	38.0	22.0	16.0		
1924	15,000	580	426	154	38.4	28.2	10.2		
1925	15,000	660	582	78	42.9	37.8	5.1		
1926	16,000	619	340	279	39.7	21.8	17.9		
1927	16,000	615	322	293	38.7	20.3	18.4		
1928	16,000	680	366	314	42.0	22.6	19.4		
1929	17,000	743	353	390	45.0	21.4	23.6		
1930	17,000	768	383	385	45.7	22.8	22.9		
1931	17,000	779	431	348	46.1	25.5	20.6		
1932	17,000	728	625	103	43.3	37.1	6.2		
1933	17,000	776	370	406	45.6	21.8	23.8		
1934	17,000	807	503	304	46.4	28.9	17.5		
1935	18,000	813	835	−22	46.5	47.7	−1.3		
1936	18,000	740	811	−71	42.0	46.1	−4.0		
1937	18,000	767	474	293	43.1	26.6	16.5		
1938	18,000	731	375	356	40.4	20.7	19.7		
1939	18,000	762	680	82	41.6	37.2	4.5		
1940	19,000	873	356	517	46.9	19.1	27.8		
1941	19,000	815	364	451	42.7	19.1	23.6		
1942	20,000	904	448	456	46.1	22.9	23.3		
1943	20,000	796	429	367	39.8	21.5	18.4		
1944	20,000	911	491	420	44.7	24.1	20.6		
1945	21,000	818	408	410	39.5	19.7	19.8		
1946	21,000	920	416	504	43.6	19.7	23.9		
1947	22,000	953	490	463	44.1	22.7	21.4		
1948	22,000	883	499	384	40.5	22.9	17.6	5.695	
1949	22,000	989	898	91	44.7	40.6	4.1	6.045	
1950	23,000	1,129	539	590	50.0	23.8	26.1	6.930	
1951	23,000	999	550	449	42.9	23.6	19.3	5.770	
1952	24,000	1,034	475	559	43.1	19.8	23.3	5.960	
1953	25,000	1,109	398	711	44.9	16.1	28.8	6.150	
1954	26,000	1,136	388	748	44.4	15.2	29.2	6.310	
1955	27,000	1,234	375	859	46.4	14.1	32.3	6.605	
1956	27,000	1,293	351	942	47.2	12.8	34.4	6.670	
1957	29,000	1,361	337	1,024	47.6	11.8	35.8	6.925	
1958	30,000	1,410	290	1,120	47.2	9.7	37.5	6.815	
1959	31,000	1,491	285	1,206	47.6	9.1	38.5	7.145	
1960	33,000	1,586	256	1,330	48.6	7.8	40.7	7.245	
1961	34,000	1,644	292	1,352	48.8	8.7	40.1	7.310	
1962	35,000	1,610	361	1,249	46.1	10.3	35.8	7.085	
1963	36,000	1,671	279	1,392	46.2	7.7	38.5	7.035	
1964	38,000	1,797	329	1,468	47.4	8.7	38.7	7.270	
1965	39,000	1,738	337	1,401	44.3	8.6	35.7	6.960	
1966	41,000	1,781	329	1,452	43.5	8.0	35.5	6.995	
1967	43,000	1,685	314	1,371	39.3	7.3	32.0	6.395	
1968	45,000	1,576	333	1,243	35.3	7.4	27.8	5.845	
1969	46,000	1,310	311	999	28.5	6.8	21.7	4.580	
1970	46,000	1,144	283	861	24.7	6.1	18.6	3.900	
1971	47,000	1,028	289	739	21.8	6.1	15.7	3.245	
1972	48,000	948	295	653	19.6	6.1	13.5	2.770	
1973	49,000	940	339	601	19.2	6.9	12.3	2.690	36.2
1974	50,000	866	332	534	17.5	6.7	10.8	2.300	28.9
1975	50,000	815	313	502	17.5	6.3	11.2	2.345	36.8
1976	50,000	859	348	511	17.3	7.0	10.3	2.255	32.6
1977	49,000	918	373	545	18.6	7.2	11.4	2.349	42.5
1978	49,000	870	309	561	17.7	6.4	11.3	2.197	26.4
1979	50,000	900	393	507	18.2	8.1	10.0	2.187	37.8
1980	50,000	1,034	380	654	20.5	7.6	12.8	2.435	31.9
1981	51,000	1,056	381	675	20.6	7.5	13.1	2.332	31.3
1982	52,000	1,052	408	644	20.6	8.2	12.4	2.236	37.1
1983	52,000	994	433	561	18.9	8.3	10.6	2.054	37.2
1984	53,000	1,054	439	615	20.0	8.3	11.7	2.107	28.5
1985	53,000	1,152	435	717	21.4	8.2	13.2	2.241	24.3
1986	54,000	1,055	445	610	19.7	8.3	11.4	2.044	22.7
1987	54,000	1,104	445	659	20.4	8.2	12.2	2.083	26.3
1988	55,000	1,213	432	781	22.1	7.9	14.3	2.317	16.5
1989	55,000	1,210	455	755	21.9	8.2	13.7	2.299	21.5
1990	56,000	1,258	467	791	22.6	8.4	14.2	2.444	32.6
1991	56,000	1,192	458	734	21.5	8.3	13.2	2.421	34.4
1992	55,000	1,237	441	796	22.4	8.0	14.4	2.607	12.9
1993	55,000	1,180	432	748	21.3	7.8	13.5	2.578	26.3
1994	56,000	1,139	445	694	20.5	8.0	12.5	2.524	22.8
1995	56,000	1,101	480	621	19.7	8.6	11.1	2.545	20.9
1996	56,000	1,051	444	607	18.8	8.0	10.9	2.521	22.8
1997	56,000	1,095	492	603	19.6	8.8	10.8	2.780	18.3
1998	56,000	980	457	523	17.5	8.1	9.3	2.491	20.4
1999	56,000	945	479	466	16.8	8.5	8.3	2.394	16.9
2000	56,000	879	450	429	15.7	8.0	7.7	2.372	18.2
2001	56,000	942	466	476	16.8	8.3	8.5	2.497	10.6
2002	57,000	954	446	508	16.9	7.8	9.1	2.554	13.6
2003	57,000	879	411	468	15.4	7.2	8.2	2.363	8.0
2004	57,000	892	479	413	15.6	8.4	7.2	2.405	13.5
2005	57,000	886	465	421	15.5	8.1	7.4	2.354	7.9
2006	57,000	842	440	402	14.8	7.7	7.1	2.236	16.6
2007	57,000	853	452	401	15.1	7.9	7.2	2.286	10.6
2008	56,000	834	428	406	14.9	7.6	7.3	2.232	9.6
2009	56,000	895	437	458	16.0	7.8	8.2	2.353	4.5
2010	56,000	869	504	365	15.5	9.0	6.5	2.239	8.1
2011	57,000	821	476	345	14.4	8.3	6.1	2.083	11.0
2012	57,000	786	459	327	13.8	8.0	5.8	1.959	8.9
2013	56,000	820	444	376	14.6	7.9	6.7	2.024	8.5
2014	56,000	805	461	344	14.4	8.2	6.2	1.984	7.5
2015	56,000	854	472	382	15.2	8.4	6.8	2.103	10.5
2016	56,000	830	487	343	14.8	8.7	6.1	2.042	7.2
2017	56,000	853	499	354	15.2	8.9	6.3	2.089	7.0
2018	56,000	819	487	332	14.6	8.7	5.9	1.988	7.3
2019	56,000	849	548	301	15.2	9.8	5.4	2.050	11.8
2020	56,000	835	520	315	14.9	9.3	5.6	2.055	8.4
2021	56,000	761	531	230	13.4	9.3	4.1	1.818	14.5
2022	57,000	748	525	223	13.2	9.3	3.9	1.790	12.0
2023	57,000	716	534	182	12.7	9.4	3.3	1.718	12.6
2024	57,000	684	527	157	12.0	9.3	2.8	1.644	11.7
2025	57,000	684	550	134	12.0	9.7	2.4	1.644	

=== Life expectancy at birth ===
total population: 71.25 years
male: 68.6 years
female: 74.04 years (2012 est.)

== Ethnic groups ==
Ethnic groups of Greenland (2018)
Ethnic groups	percent
Inuit	89.7%
Danish	7.8%
Other Nordic	1.1%
Other	1.4%

Significant minority groups
Nationality	Population (2024)
Philippines	921
Thailand	349
Poland	138
Iceland	122
Sri Lanka	121
Sweden	78
China	65
Norway	63
Germany	54
United States	39
Other America	39

The population of Greenland consists of Greenlandic Inuit (including mixed-race people), Danish Greenlanders and other Europeans and North Americans. The Inuit population makes up approximately 85–90% of the total (2009 est.). 6,792 people from Denmark live in Greenland, which is 12% of its total population.

The average Greenlander has 75% Inuit ancestry and 25% European ancestry, tracing about half of their paternal DNA to Danish male ancestors.

In recent years, Greenland experienced a significant increase in immigration from Asia, especially from the Philippines, Thailand, and China.

== Languages ==
The only official language of Greenland is Greenlandic. The number of speakers of Greenlandic is estimated at 50,000 (85–90% of the total population), divided in three main dialects, Kalaallisut (West-Greenlandic, 44,000 speakers and the dialect that is used as official language), Tunumiit (East-Greenlandic, 3,000 speakers) and Inuktun (North-Greenlandic, 800 speakers). The remainder of the population mainly speaks Danish; Inuit Sign Language is the language of the deaf community.

== Religion ==
Religion in Greenland (2010):
1. Protestantism (95.5%)
2. Roman Catholicism (0.20%)
3. Other Christian (0.40%)
4. Inuit spiritual beliefs (0.80%)
5. Agnostic (2.30%)
6. Atheist (0.20%)
7. Other religion (0.60%)

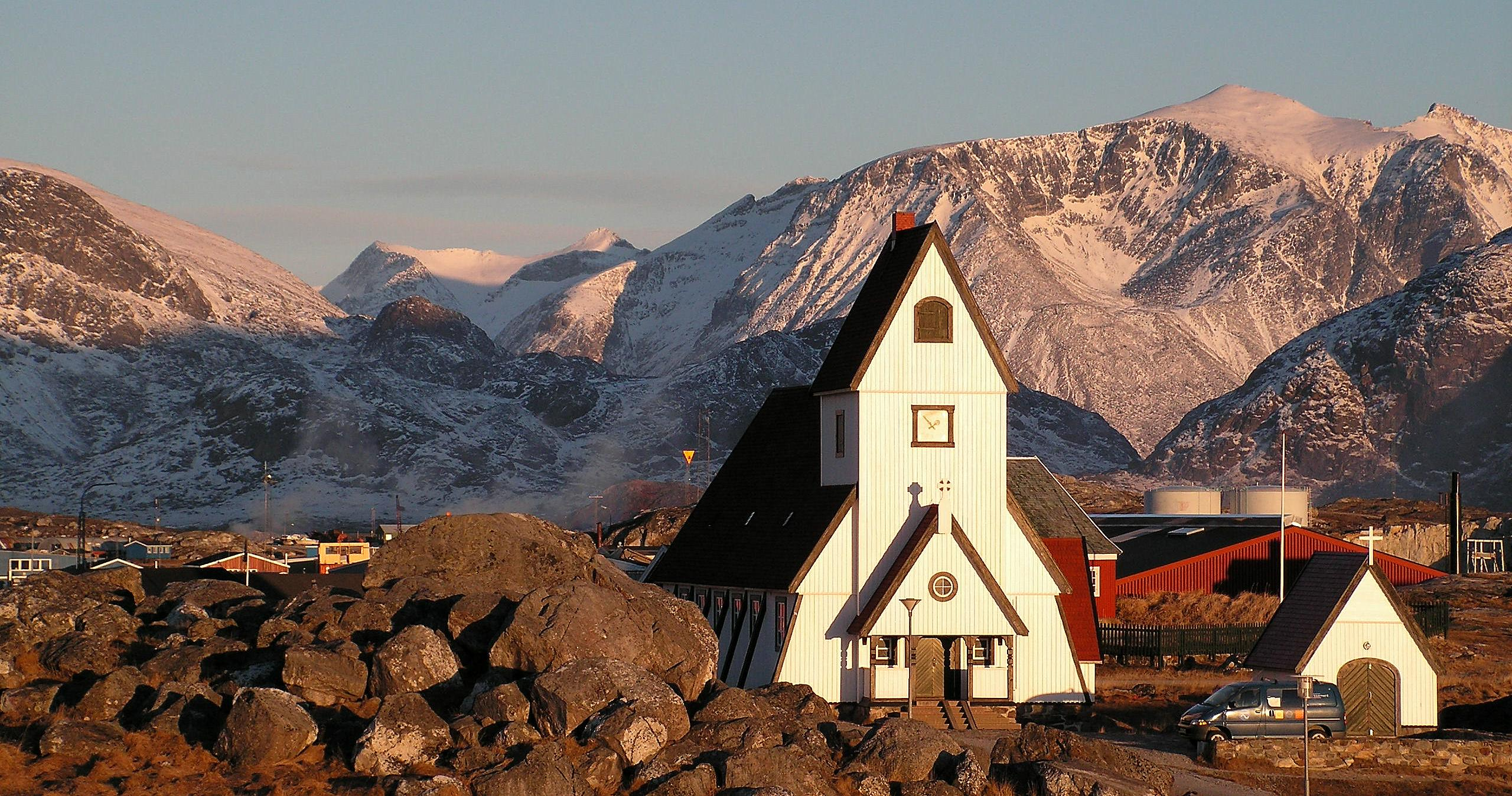
Most Greenlandic villages, including Nanortalik (Bjørnsted), have their own Lutheran church under the Church of Denmark

The nomadic Inuit were traditionally shamanistic, with a well-developed mythology primarily concerned with propitiating a vengeful and fingerless sea Goddess who controlled the success of the seal and whale hunts.

The first Norse colonists were pagan, but Erik the Red's son Leif was converted to Catholic Christianity by King Olaf Trygvesson on a trip to Norway in 990 and sent missionaries back to Greenland. These swiftly established sixteen parishes, some monasteries, and a bishopric at Garðar.

Rediscovering these colonists and spreading the Protestant Reformation among them was one of the primary reasons for the Danish recolonization in the 18th century. Under the patronage of the Royal Mission College in Copenhagen, Norwegian and Danish Lutherans and German Moravian missionaries searched for the missing Norse settlements and began converting the Inuit. The principal figures in the Christianization of Greenland were Hans and Poul Egede and Matthias Stach. The New Testament was translated piecemeal from the time of the very first settlement on Kangeq Island, but the first translation of the whole Bible was not completed until 1900. An improved translation using the modern orthography was completed in 2000.

Today, the major religion is Protestant Christianity, mostly members of the Lutheran Church of Denmark. While there is no official census data on religion in Greenland, the Lutheran Bishop of Greenland Sofie Petersen estimated that 85% of the Greenlandic population were members of its congregation in 2009. Estimates in 2022 put the figure at 93%.

== Spiral case ==
In the 1960s and 70s, Greenland was subject to an IUD program. At least 4,500 Inuit women were implanted with IUD's - about half the fertile population of women at the time. It is unclear how many cases lacked consent or proper explanation. The program was publicly known, with Danish doctors writing of it in journals. The involuntary program regained public awareness in 2022 with an investigation known as the spiral case.
