= Foreign relations of Norway =

The foreign relations of Norway are based on the country's membership in NATO and within the workings of the United Nations (UN). Additionally, despite not being a member of the European Union (EU), Norway takes a part in the integration of EU through its membership in the European Economic Area. Norway's foreign ministry includes both the minister of foreign affairs and minister of international development.

== History ==
The Ministry of Foreign Affairs was established on the same day that Norway declared the dissolution of the union with Sweden: June 7, 1905. Although diplomats could not present credentials to foreign governments until the Swedish king formally renounced his right to the Norwegian throne, a number of unofficial representatives worked on the provisional government's behalf until the first Norwegian ambassador, Hjalmar Christian Hauge, sought accreditation by the United States Secretary of State Elihu Root on November 6, 1905.

The initial purposes of the newly formed Foreign Ministry were to represent Norway's interests through diplomatic channels, and to provide consular services for Norwegian shipping and commerce overseas. In 1906, the Storting decided to establish six embassies in Europe, with two more in the Americas: one in the United States and one in Argentina. 20 consular offices were also opened.

During World War I, the foreign ministry was confronted with unprecedented challenges in maintaining neutrality for Norway, in particular in order to protect its merchant fleet.

In 1922, the ministry was consolidated and reorganised to ensure fuller cooperation between the diplomatic and consular branches. The reorganization included the formation of a designated career path for diplomats that included completion of a university entrance examination and professional experience from international trade. The economic hardship of the times forced austerity measures at the ministry for the next several years.

When Norway was invaded by Nazi Germany in 1940, the government fled to the United Kingdom and reconstituted in exile in Bracknell, outside London. Kingston House in London was later used. The government moved back to Norway following the peace in 1945.

After the end of World War II, Norway was a founding member of the North Atlantic Treaty Organization and the United Nations, the latter having Norwegian Trygve Lie as inaugural Secretary-General. Norway was also part of the first slate of non-permanent members to the United Nations Security Council.

== Elements of policy ==
Since the end of the Cold War, Norway has developed a model to foreign policy known as the "Norwegian model," the goal of which is to contribute to peace and stability through coordinated response among governmental and non-governmental Norwegian organizations; acting as an honest broker in international conflicts; an informal network of Norwegian individuals with access and credibility among parties; and the willingness to take the long view in international issues.

The post-war foreign policy of Norway can be described along four dimensions:

=== Strategic alliances ===
Norway's strategic importance for waging war in the North Atlantic became important in the failed neutrality policy of World War II. Norway became a founding member of NATO in order to ally itself with countries that shared its democratic values. Both through diplomatic and military cooperation, Norway has played a visible role in the formation and operations of NATO. It allowed a limited number of military bases and exercises to be based in its territories, which caused some controversy when NATO decided to put forward bases in Northern Norway in preparation for a conflict with the Soviet Union.

=== International cooperation ===
Norway supports international cooperation and the peaceful settlement of disputes, recognizing the need for maintaining a strong national defence through collective security. Accordingly, the cornerstones of Norwegian policy are active membership in NATO and support for the United Nations and its specialized agencies. Norway also pursues a policy of economic, social, and cultural cooperation with other Nordic countries—Denmark, Sweden, Finland, and Iceland—through the Nordic Council. Its relations with Iceland are very close due to the cultural bond the two nations share. Norway ended a 2-year term on the UN Security Council in January 2003, and chaired the Iraq Sanctions Committee.

Norway, along with Iceland and the Faroe Islands, is not a member of the European Union, all three are members of the European Economic Area. Membership of the EU has been proposed within Norway, and referendums over Norwegian membership were held in 1972 and 1994. Popular opinion was split between rural and urban areas. See Norway and the European Union. The present government is not planning to raise the possibility for future membership.

Norway also has a history of co-operation and friendship with the United Kingdom and Scotland, due to their shared cultural heritage since Viking times. The Vikings conquered areas including the Hebrides, Orkney and Shetland for several hundred years. Norway is only 300 kilometres (159 Nautical miles) east of Unst, the northernmost island of Shetland. The Norwegian embassy to the United Kingdom is located in London, and Norway also maintains a Consulate General in Edinburgh. A Norway Spruce is given by the city of Oslo and presented to London as a Christmas tree for display in Trafalgar Square as a token of gratitude for the UK's support during World War II. King Haakon, his son Crown Prince Olav and the country's government lived in exile in London throughout the war. As part of the tradition, the Lord Mayor of Westminster visits Oslo in the late autumn to take part in the felling of the tree, and the Mayor of Oslo then goes to London to light the tree at the Christmas ceremony.

On 25 April 2022, Norwegian foreign minister visited Bangladesh as part of her two-day trip in order to broaden economic partnership through trade, investment and maritime sector cooperation.

=== International mediation and nation building ===
Norway has played an active role as a third party mediator in a number of international conflicts. The late foreign minister Johan Jørgen Holst was instrumental in forging the Oslo Accords between Israel and the PLO. Thorvald Stoltenberg was part of the unsuccessful mediation team in seeking an end to the war in Bosnia. Norway has contributed both mediation services and financial assistance in Guatemala.

As of 2005, Norwegian diplomats are acting as mediators in Sudan, Bosnia, Sri Lanka, and Colombia. Some of those countries accuse Norway of supporting and propping up separatist groups. Israel is often bitter with harsh criticisms from Norwegian politicians. The spat was at its highest when finance minister Kristin Halvorsen supported boycott of Israeli goods. in early 2006. Finance ministry spokesman, Runar Malkenes, told BBC News that "there are no moves to push for a boycott of Israeli goods" at government level. Eritrea has been actively supported by Norway during its liberation from Ethiopia. As of recent, Ethiopia expelled six Norwegian diplomats due to Norway's alleged support to 'Terrorist group and Eritrea'. Norway retaliated by cutting aid to Ethiopia.

After the Al-Qaeda attack on the United States on September 11, 2001, NATO launched a military invasion to overthrow Al-Qaeda and its Taliban sponsors. Norway was one of 51 donors providing aid and assistance to rebuild the war-torn country. Norway had charge of Faryab Province. The Norwegian-led Provincial Reconstruction Team had the mission of effecting security, good governance and economic development, 2005–2012. But the results were dubious and frustration continued until the U.S. and all other countries finally decided to withdraw by 2021.

=== International disputes ===
Territorial claims in Antarctica (Queen Maud Land and Peter I Island) are only recognized by Australia, France, New Zealand and the United Kingdom.

=== Status-seeking ===
A number of scholars have argued that Norway has through its foreign policy engaged in status-seeking. Through an activist foreign policy, Norway has sought to elevate its standing among the international system's small powers and middle powers, and earn recognition from the great powers.

== Diplomatic relations ==
List of countries which Norway maintains diplomatic relations with:

#	Country	Date
1	United States	30 October 1905
2	Russia	31 October 1905
3	France	5 November 1905
4	United Kingdom	6 November 1905
5	Denmark	7 November 1905
6	Japan	7 November 1905
7	Belgium	14 November 1905
8	Sweden	18 November 1905
9	Spain	26 November 1905
10	Thailand	30 November 1905
11	Netherlands	4 December 1905
12	Switzerland	22 January 1906
13	Portugal	17 March 1906
14	Italy	22 March 1906
15	Argentina	28 March 1906
16	Paraguay	2 April 1906
17	Uruguay	3 April 1906
18	Mexico	9 April 1906
19	Cuba	20 June 1906
20	Bulgaria	20 August 1906
21	Brazil	11 May 1908
22	Iran	14 October 1908
23	Serbia	9 March 1917
24	Romania	14 May 1917
25	Finland	2 March 1918
26	Greece	25 May 1918
27	Chile	9 June 1919
28	Poland	4 July 1919
29	Hungary	12 February 1920
30	Austria	8 October 1920
31	Czech Republic	13 January 1921
32	Peru	3 August 1923
33	Venezuela	4 October 1929
34	Turkey	8 October 1930
35	Luxembourg	15 April 1931
36	Colombia	6 September 1935
37	Egypt	25 April 1936
38	Ecuador	22 October 1936
39	Bolivia	25 February 1937
40	El Salvador	27 April 1939
41	Guatemala	28 April 1939
42	Costa Rica	2 May 1939
43	Iceland	29 August 1940
44	Canada	24 January 1942
45	Dominican Republic	16 October 1943
46	Haiti	28 October 1943
47	Ethiopia	28 April 1945
48	South Africa	16 June 1946
49	Iraq	28 September 1946
50	Australia	23 June 1947
51	Honduras	3 July 1947
52	Nicaragua	5 July 1947
53	India	15 August 1947
54	Philippines	2 March 1948
55	Panama	21 July 1948
56	Lebanon	10 August 1948
57	Syria	11 August 1948
58	Pakistan	18 December 1948
59	Indonesia	25 January 1950
60	Ireland	17 February 1950
61	Israel	19 July 1950
62	Sri Lanka	13 October 1950
63	Germany	10 May 1951
64	China	5 October 1954
65	Myanmar	18 May 1956
66	Sudan	31 May 1956
67	Tunisia	29 August 1958
68	Morocco	30 August 1958
69	South Korea	22 March 1959
70	Nigeria	1 October 1960
71	Madagascar	27 October 1960
72	Senegal	2 December 1960
73	Yemen	23 March 1961
74	Saudi Arabia	8 May 1961
75	Guinea	21 July 1961
76	Ivory Coast	27 September 1962
77	Algeria	27 October 1962
78	Cyprus	22 March 1963
79	Afghanistan	3 January 1964
80	Niger	24 January 1964
81	Kenya	22 February 1964
82	Uganda	21 July 1964
83	Benin	25 September 1964
84	Tanzania	28 September 1964
85	Zambia	2 February 1965
86	Liberia	17 February 1965
87	Malawi	9 March 1965
88	Ghana	19 May 1965
89	Cameroon	15 June 1965
90	Gabon	28 September 1965
91	Kuwait	30 June 1965
92	Libya	20 July 1966
93	Burundi	1966
94	Republic of the Congo	23 May 1967
95	Botswana	30 November 1967
96	Malaysia	8 March 1968
97	Mongolia	11 May 1968
98	Jordan	7 January 1969
99	Malta	11 February 1969
100	Singapore	7 March 1969
101	Democratic Republic of the Congo	27 September 1969
102	New Zealand	10 October 1969
103	Central African Republic	16 May 1970
104	Sierra Leone	20 July 1970
105	Rwanda	30 January 1971
106	Somalia	30 March 1971
107	Albania	29 May 1971
108	Trinidad and Tobago	19 November 1971
109	Vietnam	25 November 1971
110	Togo	10 January 1972
111	Bangladesh	14 April 1972
112	Nepal	26 January 1973
113	Mauritius	30 January 1973
114	Qatar	9 June 1973
115	North Korea	22 June 1973
116	United Arab Emirates	4 July 1973
117	Bahrain	15 July 1973
118	Barbados	24 January 1975
119	Guinea-Bissau	7 April 1975
120	Mozambique	25 June 1975
121	Lesotho	8 May 1976
122	Papua New Guinea	9 August 1976
123	Cambodia	18 November 1976
124	Fiji	18 January 1977
125	Suriname	8 February 1977
126	Cape Verde	9 May 1977
127	Mali	17 June 1977
128	Jamaica	7 October 1977
129	Angola	31 October 1977
130	Guyana	2 August 1979
131	Burkina Faso	21 September 1979
132	Oman	15 April 1980
133	Zimbabwe	18 April 1980
134	Solomon Islands	18 September 1980
—	Holy See	2 August 1982
135	Gambia	8 February 1983
136	Mauritania	6 December 1983
137	Maldives	26 March 1984
138	Belize	12 July 1984
139	Brunei	12 October 1984
140	Eswatini	11 December 1984
141	Seychelles	1 February 1985
142	Antigua and Barbuda	14 October 1985
143	Bhutan	5 November 1985
144	Tonga	30 August 1988
145	Namibia	21 March 1990
—	Cook Islands	18 July 1991
146	Estonia	27 August 1991
147	Latvia	27 August 1991
148	Lithuania	27 August 1991
149	Bahamas	11 November 1991
150	Laos	12 November 1991
151	Liechtenstein	9 January 1992
152	Belarus	4 February 1992
153	Ukraine	5 February 1992
154	Slovenia	18 February 1992
155	Croatia	20 February 1992
156	Moldova	3 June 1992
157	Armenia	5 June 1992
158	Azerbaijan	5 June 1992
159	Georgia	5 June 1992
160	Kazakhstan	5 June 1992
161	Turkmenistan	8 June 1992
162	Tajikistan	10 June 1992
163	Uzbekistan	10 June 1992
164	Kyrgyzstan	26 June 1992
165	Saint Kitts and Nevis	15 October 1992
166	Marshall Islands	16 October 1992
167	Slovakia	1 January 1993
168	Saint Vincent and the Grenadines	19 February 1993
169	Bosnia and Herzegovina	12 December 1993
170	North Macedonia	20 December 1993
171	Eritrea	14 March 1994
172	Djibouti	20 January 1995
173	Chad	13 November 1995
174	Andorra	15 November 1995
175	San Marino	11 December 1996
176	Saint Lucia	11 November 1998
177	Grenada	26 April 2000
178	Nauru	9 August 2000
179	Dominica	26 March 2001
180	Timor-Leste	20 May 2002
181	São Tomé and Príncipe	6 August 2004
182	Montenegro	21 June 2006
183	Equatorial Guinea	30 March 2007
—	Kosovo	25 October 2008
184	Tuvalu	8 May 2010
185	Monaco	16 November 2010
186	South Sudan	9 July 2011
187	Palau	31 May 2017
188	Federated States of Micronesia	12 April 2018
189	Vanuatu	28 May 2018
190	Comoros	28 June 2019
191	Samoa	8 March 2019
192	Kiribati	17 August 2019
—	State of Palestine	24 April 2025

== Multilateral ==
Organization	Formal Relations Began	Notes
European Union		See Norway–European Union relations
NATO		See Norway–NATO relations

== Africa ==
Country	Formal Relations Began	Notes
Kenya		See Kenya–Norway relations: Norway has an embassy in Nairobi.; Kenya has an embassy in Oslo.
Sudan		See Norway–Sudan relations: Norway has an embassy in Khartoum.; Sudan has an embassy in Oslo.

== Americas ==
Country	Formal Relations Began	Notes
Belize		Since 2011, Belize and Norway have an Agreement concerning the exchange of information relating to tax matters they had signed in 2010.
Brazil		See Brazil–Norway relations: Norway has an embassy in Brasília and consulate-general in Rio de Janeiro.; Brazil has an embassy in Oslo.
Canada		See Canada–Norway relations: Norway has an embassy in Ottawa and four consulates-general in Calgary, Montreal, Toronto and Vancouver.; Canada has an embassy in Oslo.; Both nations are full members of the Arctic Council, of the Organization for Security and Co-operation in Europe, of NATO and of the Organisation for Economic Co-operation and Development.; Canadian Ministry of Foreign Affairs and International Trade about relations with Norway; See also: Norwegian Canadians
Chile		See Chile–Norway relations: Norway has an embassy in Santiago.; Chile has an embassy in Oslo.
Mexico	1906	See Mexico–Norway relations: Mexico has an embassy in Oslo.; Norway has an embassy in Mexico City.
United States	1905	See Norway–United States relations: Norway has an embassy in Washington, D.C., and four consulates-general in Houston, New York City, Philadelphia and San Francisco.; United States has an embassy in Oslo.; See also: Norwegian Americans

== Asia ==
Country	Formal Relations Began	Notes
Afghanistan		See Afghanistan–Norway relations
Armenia		Armenia is accredited to Norway from its embassy in Stockholm, Sweden.; Norway is accredited to Armenia from its embassy in Tbilisi, Georgia and maintains an honorary consulate in Yerevan.; Both countries are full members of the Council of Europe.
China	October 5, 1954	See China–Norway relations: Norway has an embassy in Beijing and three consulates-general in Guangzhou, Hong Kong and Shanghai.; China has an embassy in Oslo.
Georgia		Georgia has an embassy in Oslo.; Norway has an embassy in Tbilisi.; Both countries are full members of the Council of Europe.
India	1947	See India–Norway relations: Norway has an embassy in New Delhi and three consulate-generals in Mumbai, Chennai and Kolkata.; India has an embassy in Oslo.
Indonesia		See Indonesia–Norway relations: Norway has an embassy in Jakarta.; Indonesia has an embassy in Oslo.
Iran		Iran has an embassy in Oslo.; Norway has an embassy in Tehran.
Israel		See Israel–Norway relations Norway was one of the first countries to recognize Israel on February 4, 1949. Both countries established diplomatic relation later that year.: Norway has an embassy in Tel Aviv.; Israel has an embassy in Oslo.; See also: History of the Jews in Norway
Japan	1905	See Japan–Norway relations: Japan has an embassy in Oslo.; Norway has an embassy in Tokyo.
Malaysia	1957	See Malaysia–Norway relations: Norway has an embassy in Kuala Lumpur.; Malaysia has an embassy in Stockholm whose consular area also covers Norway.
Mongolia	January 11, 1968	See Mongolia–Norway relations: Mongolia is accredited to Norway from its embassy in Stockholm, Sweden.; Norway is accredited to Mongolia from its embassy in Beijing, China.
Nepal	January 26, 1973	See Nepal–Norway relations Diplomatic relations were established on January 26, 1973. Norway established an embassy in Kathmandu in 2000. In 2008, Norwegian Prime Minister Jens Stoltenberg and Minister of the Environment and International Development Erik Solheim visited Nepal. In 2009, Prime Minister Prachanda visited Norway. In May 2008, a small bomb exploded outside the Norwegian embassy in Kathmandu. No one was injured.: Norway has an embassy in Kathmandu.; Nepal has an embassy in Oslo.
Pakistan	1947	See Norway-Pakistan relations
Palestine		A Palestinian representation in Oslo has had status of "general delegation". In December 2010 during a visit to Norway Palestinian Prime Minister Salam Fayyad announced that this mission would be upgraded to a diplomatic mission. This will take effect early in 2011. With the rank of ambassador its head will have the title "head of the Palestinian mission". Norway thus becomes the fourth European country to take similar steps, following Spain, France and Portugal. The upgrade does not constitute recognition of a Palestinian state by Norway, however.
Philippines	March 2, 1948	See Norway–Philippines relations Relations between the Philippines and Norway were established on March 2, 1948, the Philippines has an embassy in Oslo while Norway has an embassy in Manila. Norway is also involved in the peace process in the Philippines related to Moro and Communist insurgencies and is also a member country of the International Monitoring Team for the GPH-MILF Peace Process. Norway is also the third country facilitator for the GPH-CPP–NPA–NDF Peace Process. Trade between the Philippines and Norway amounted up to $73 million.: Norway has an embassy in Manila.; Philippines has an embassy in Oslo.
Saudi Arabia		See Norway–Saudi Arabia relations: Norway has an embassy in Riyadh and consulate-general in Jeddah.; Saudi Arabia has an embassy in Oslo.
South Korea	March 2, 1959	See Norway-South Korea relations The establishment of diplomatic relations between Kongeriket Noreg and the Republic of Korea began on March 2, 1959.: Relations are very so good to be getting better in every cooperation since 1959.; Royal Norwegian embassy in Seoul. and an Honorary Consulate in Busan.; South Korean embassy in Oslo.; Norwegian Ministry of Foreign Affairs about bilateral relations with South Korea; South Korean Ministry of Foreign Affairs about bilateral relations with the Kingdom of Norway (in Korean)
Syria		See Norway–Syria relations In March 2012 the Norwegian Foreign Ministry announced that the Norwegian embassy in Damascus will be temporarily closed, mainly due to the deteriorating security situation in the country, however Foreign Minister Jonas Gahr Støre also emphasized the closing being a political signal. One Norwegian diplomat will remain, stationed at the Danish embassy.
Turkey		See Norway–Turkey relations: Norway has an embassy in Ankara and consulate-general in Istanbul.; Turkey has an embassy in Oslo.; Both countries are full members of the Council of Europe and NATO.

== Europe ==
Country	Formal Relations Began	Notes
Austria		Austria has an embassy in Oslo.; Norway has an embassy in Vienna.; Both countries are full members of the Council of Europe.
Croatia	1992	See Croatia–Norway relations: Croatia has an embassy in Oslo.; Norway has an embassy in Zagreb.; Both countries are full members of the Council of Europe and NATO.
Cyprus		See Cyprus–Norway relations Diplomatic relations were established on March 22, 1963. The government in Cyprus considers that "bilateral relations between Cyprus and Norway are excellent in all fields". Neither country has resident ambassadors. Cyprus is represented in Norway through its embassy in Stockholm, Sweden and 2 honorary consulates, one in Oslo and the second in Kristiansand. Norway is represented in Cyprus through its embassy in Athens, Greece and an honorary consulate in Nicosia. Both countries are full members of the Council of Europe. On August 21, 1951, there was a Consular Convention and an Exchange of Letters relating to establishing diplomatic relations. On May 2, 1951, there was a Convention for the Avoidance of Double Taxation and the Prevention of Fiscal Evasion with respect to Taxes on Income. On May 17, 1962, there was an Exchange of Letters constituting an Agreement on the Abolition of Visa Requirement in Nicosia. On March 5, 1963, there was an Agreement on Commercial Scheduled Air Transport signed in London. Norway provides direct funding to the Cypriot Government and also to local authorities, NGOs and educational institutions through EEA and Norway Grants. The NGO Fund in Cyprus is co-financed by the European Economic Area (EEA) Financial Mechanism and the Norwegian Financial Mechanism. It was established in 2004. In 2006, Norway increased its commitment to offer a total contribution of 4.66 million euros. In 2007 a delegation from the EEA and Norway Grants went to Cyprus to "monitor the spending of Norwegian funds given to Cyprus as part of the European Economic Area." In 2008 Norwegian Foreign Minister Jonas Gahr Støre traveled to Cyprus to meet President Demetris Christofias. They met to discuss Norway's assistance to the Cypriot village of Salamiou, in Paphos. The Norwegians plan to rebuild an old elementary school in the village. It will then become a Regional Centre for Environmental Education at the cost of €735,000. The taxation levels in Cyprus are considerably lower than in Norway, and Cyprus has actively courted Norwegians to move to Cyprus. Among the Norwegians who moved to Cyprus is the shipping billionaire John Fredriksen, who was the richest man in Norway. In 1996 tax rules in Norway were changed to keep shipping companies competitive and under the Norwegian flag. By 2008 changes to the tonnage tax regime to harmonize them with the European Union forced some companies to register in Cyprus. Norwegian Service rig company Prosafe moved their headquarters to Cyprus. Several Norwegian retirees also moved to Cyprus; this too is largely to benefit from the lower tax rate on Cyprus and the minimal crime. The Norwegian colony on Cyprus is in Paphos.: Cyprus Ministry of Foreign Affairs: list of bilateral treaties with Norway; Cyprus is accredited to Norway from its embassy in Stockholm, Sweden.; Norway is accredited to Cyprus from its embassy in Athens, Greece.
Denmark		See Denmark–Norway relations Both countries have a very long history together, both countries were part of the Kalmar Union between 1397 and 1523. Norway was in Union with Denmark between 1537 and 1814. Both countries established diplomatic relations in 1905, after Norway's independence. Both countries are full members of the Council of the Baltic Sea States, of NATO, and of the Council of Europe. There are around 15,000 Norwegian people living in Denmark and around 20,000 Danish people living in Norway.: Denmark has an embassy in Oslo.; Norway has an embassy in Copenhagen.; Both countries are full members of the Council of Europe and NATO.
Estonia		Estonia has an embassy in Oslo.; Norway has an embassy in Tallinn.; Both countries are full members of NATO and of the Council of Europe.
European Union		See Norway–European Union relations Norway is part of the EU market via the European Economic Area and the Schengen Area.
Finland		See Finland–Norway relations: Finland has an embassy in Oslo.; Norway has an embassy in Helsinki.; Both countries are full members of the Council of Europe and NATO.
France	1905	See France–Norway relations: France has an embassy in Oslo.; Norway has an embassy in Paris.; Both countries are full members of the Council of Europe and NATO.
Germany		See Germany–Norway relations: Germany has an embassy in Oslo.; Norway has an embassy in Berlin, a consulate-general in Hamburg and a consulate in Düsseldorf.; Both countries are full members of the Council of Europe and NATO.
Greece		See Greece–Norway relations: Greece has an embassy in Oslo.; Norway has an embassy in Athens.; Both countries are full members of the Council of Europe and NATO.
Hungary	1920	Hungary has an embassy in Oslo and 2 honorary consulates (in Stavanger and Sarpsborg).; Norway has an embassy in Budapest.; Both countries are full members of the Council of Europe and NATO.
Iceland		See Iceland–Norway relations In 2007, the two countries signed a defense agreement, covering surveillance and military defense of Icelandic air space and economic zone. It means that Norwegian jet fighters and surveillance aircraft will be patrolling Icelandic air space. It is underlined that the agreement with Norway only covers peacetime. In case of a military conflict it is still NATO and the United States Government that will carry the main responsibility for Iceland's defense. The agreement was signed following the decision to pullout US military from the Keflavík naval air base.: Norway has an embassy in Reykjavík.; Iceland has an embassy in Oslo.; Both countries are full members of the Council of Europe and NATO.
Ireland		Norway has an embassy in Dublin.; Ireland has an embassy in Oslo.; Both countries are full members of the Council of Europe.
Italy		Italy has an embassy in Oslo.; Norway has an embassy in Rome.; Both countries are full members of the Council of Europe and NATO.
Kosovo		See Kosovo–Norway relations Norway recognized Kosovo on March 28, 2008. Norway has an embassy in Pristina, while Kosovo has hinted that it will include Norway in the second wave of embassy openings.
Lithuania	27 August 1991	Norway recognised Lithuania's independence on 24 August 1991. On 27 August, the countries entered into diplomatic relations. Norway is a key partner in the areas of economy, energy security, and defence. Currently, there are 12 bilateral agreements regulating the relationship between Lithuania and Norway in different areas.
Monaco		Norway is accredited to Monaco from its embassy in Paris, France and maintains an honorary consulate in Monaco.; Monaco maintains an honorary consulate in Oslo.
Netherlands		the Netherlands has an embassy in Oslo.; Norway has an embassy in The Hague.; Both countries are full members of NATO and of the Council of Europe.
Poland		See Norway–Poland relations: Norway has an embassy in Warsaw.; Poland has an embassy in Oslo.; Both countries are full members of NATO and of the Council of Europe.
Romania	April 3, 1917	See Norway–Romania relations: Both nations were established formal relations on April 3, 1917.; Norway has an embassy in Bucharest.; Romania has an embassy in Oslo.; Both nations are full members of NATO and of the Council of Europe.
Russia	October 30, 1905	See Norway–Russia relations: Both nations were established formal relations on October 30, 1905.; Norway has an embassy in Moscow, a consulate-general in St. Petersburg and a consulate in Murmansk.; Russia has an embassy in Oslo and two consulates-general in Barentsburg and Kirkenes.; See also: Kola Norwegians
Serbia		See Norway–Serbia relations: Norway has an embassy in Belgrade.; Serbia has an embassy in Oslo.; Both nations are full members of the Council of Europe and the Organization for Security and Co-operation in Europe (OSCE).; Norway supported the 1999 NATO bombing of the Federal Republic of Yugoslavia, and later participated in the Kosovo Force.
Spain		See Norway–Spain relations: Norway has an embassy in Madrid, a consulate-general in Barcelona and a consulate in Alicante.; Spain has an embassy in Oslo.; Both countries are full members of the Council of Europe and NATO.
Sweden	1905	See Norway-Sweden relations Both nations established diplomatic relations in 1905, after the dissolution of the union between Norway and Sweden in 1905.: Norway has an embassy in Stockholm.; Sweden has an embassy in Oslo.; Both countries are full members of the Council of Europe and NATO.
Switzerland		See Norway-Switzerland relations: Norway has an embassy in Bern and two consulates-general in Geneva and Zürich.; Switzerland has an embassy in Oslo.
Ukraine	1992	See Norway–Ukraine relations: The two countries established formal relations in 1992; Norway recognized Ukraine's independence in 1991; Norway has an embassy in Kyiv.; Ukraine has an embassy in Oslo.; Both countries are full members of the Council of Europe.
United Kingdom	1905	See Norway–United Kingdom relations British Prime Minister Keir Starmer with Norwegian Prime Minister Jonas Gahr Støre in Bergen, December 2024. Norway established diplomatic relations with the United Kingdom on 6 November 1905.: Norway maintains an embassy in London, and an honorary consulate general in Edinburgh.; The United Kingdom is accredited to Norway through its embassy in Oslo.; Both countries share common membership of the Atlantic Co-operation Pact, the Council of Europe, the International Criminal Court, the Joint Expeditionary Force, NATO, the OECD, the OSCE, the United Nations, and the World Trade Organization. Bilaterally the two countries have a Free Trade Agreement, a Green Partnership, and a Strategic Partnership Agreement.

== Oceania ==
Country	Formal Relations Began	Notes
Australia	1905	See Australia–Norway relations The bilateral countries between Australia and Norway were established diplomatic relations in 1905, following the Norway's independence since 1814.: Australia has an honorably consulate in Oslo, and is represented in Norway through its embassy in Copenhagen, Denmark.; Norway has an embassy in Canberra.; See also: Norwegian Australians
New Zealand	1905	See New Zealand–Norway relations Both countries established diplomatic relations in 1905, after Norway's independence. There are approximately 1,400 Norwegians living in New Zealand and 409 New Zealanders living in Norway. Reidar Sveaas, director of P&O Maritime Ltd. and honorary consul to Auckland said in 2000 that excellent opportunities existed for New Zealand to trade with the world's second largest oil-producing country, Norway. New Zealand joined 11 other countries in 2006 in delivering a formal diplomatic protest to the Norwegian Foreign Ministry in Oslo over Norway's plans to increase its whaling activities. In 2004, New Zealand Prime Minister Helen Clark became as the first Prime Minister to ever visits Norway. She said that both countries see eye-to-eye on almost everything but the commercial harvesting of whales.: New Zealand is accredited to Norway from its embassy in The Hague, Netherlands.; Norway is accredited to New Zealand from its embassy in Canberra, Australia.; See also: Norwegian New Zealanders

== See also ==
- List of diplomatic missions in Norway
- List of diplomatic missions of Norway
- List of ambassadors to Norway
- Norway and the European Union
- Norwegian Ministry of Foreign Affairs
- Arctic policy of Norway
