= Norway in NATO =

Norway–NATO relations
- NATO: Norway

Norway joined NATO on 4 April 1949 as a founding member, along with eleven other countries. Norway committed an effort to NATO's intervention in Yugoslavia in 1999 and in Libya in 2011. It also sent troops to Afghanistan after the September 11 attacks. There are two major parties in the country that support the country's exit from NATO, the Reds and the Socialist Left.

Before joining NATO, the country had been out of any alliances since its complete independence in 1905 from Sweden. That belief changed due to the German occupation during the Second World War, as neutrality was considered to be no longer a feasible policy. After the war, Norway intensified its cooperation with the United Kingdom and secured support under the US Marshall Plan.

At present, Norway which is still a founding member of NATO – falls short of the NATO requirement which states that each country should allocate 2 percent of its GDP towards military expenditure. However, the government made a pledge to accomplish this by the year 2026. In a 2022 poll, 96 percent of Norwegians said they supported NATO membership. In another poll, 72 percent of the Red Party voters said they wanted to continue membership in the alliance, despite the Red Party's principled opposition to the alliance.

In March 2024, large NATO military exercises in Finnmark, northern Norway, resulted in significant damage.

== Finnish and Swedish accession bids ==
In July 2022, Norway supported and approved Finland and Sweden's application to join NATO.

== Norway's foreign relations with NATO member states ==
- Albania
- Belgium
- Bulgaria
- Canada
- Croatia
- Czech Republic
- Denmark
- Estonia
- Finland
- France
- Germany
- Greece
- Hungary
- Iceland
- Italy
- Latvia
- Lithuania
- Luxembourg
- Montenegro
- Netherlands
- North Macedonia
- Poland
- Portugal
- Romania
- Slovakia
- Slovenia
- Spain
- Sweden
- Turkey
- United Kingdom
- United States

== See also ==
- Foreign relations of Norway
- Foreign relations of NATO
