= Norway–European Union relations =

- European Union: Norway

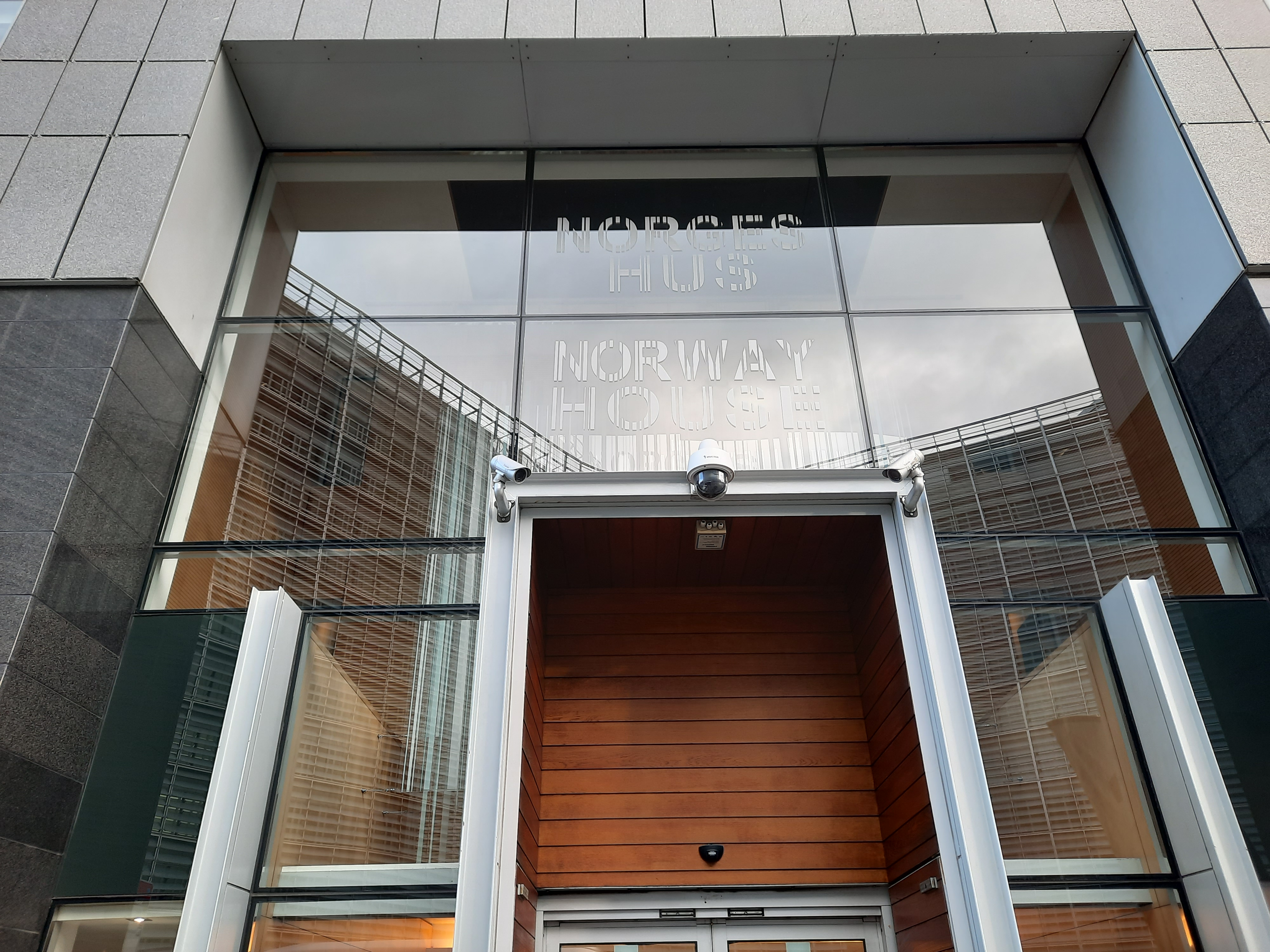
The Norwegian mission to the EU is located in the Norge House in Rue Archimède 17, Brussels.

Norway is not a member state of the European Union (EU). It is associated with the Union through its membership in the European Economic Area (EEA), signed in 1992 and established in 1994. Norway was a founding member of the European Free Trade Association (EFTA) in 1960, which was originally set up as an alternative to the European Economic Community (EEC), the main predecessor of the EU. Norway had considered joining both the EEC and the European Union, but opted to decline following referendums in 1972 and 1994. According to the European Social Survey conducted in 2018, 73.6% of Norwegians would vote 'No' in a referendum to join the European Union. Norway shares land borders with two EU member states, namely Finland and Sweden, and maritime borders with a third, Denmark.

== Comparison ==
	European Union	Norway
Population	447,206,135	5,367,580
Area	4,324,782 km^{2} (1,669,808 sq mi)	385,207 km^{2} (148,729 sq mi)
Population density	115/km^{2} (300/sq mi)	13.9/km^{2} (36.0/sq mi)
Capital	Brussels (de facto)	Oslo
Government	Supranational parliamentary democracy based on the European treaties	Unitary parliamentary constitutional monarchy
Current leader	Council President António Costa; Commission President Ursula von der Leyen	Monarch Haakon VIII; Prime Minister Jonas Gahr Støre
Official languages	24 official languages	Norwegian, Sámi languages
Main religions	72% Christianity (48% Catholicism, 12% Protestantism, 8% Eastern Orthodoxy, 4% other Christianity), 23% non-religious, 3% other, 2% Islam	82% Christian, 13% non-religious, 5% other
Ethnic groups	Germans (c. 83 million), French (c. 67 million), Italians (c. 60 million), Spanish (c. 47 million), Poles (c. 46 million), Romanians (c. 18 million), Dutch (c. 18 million), Greeks (c. 11 million), Portuguese (c. 11 million), and others	86.2% Norwegian, 13.8% non-Norwegian
GDP (nominal)	$16.477 trillion, $31,801 per capita	$443 billion, $82,711 per capita

== Trade ==
The EU dominates Norway's trade and is Norway's most important import and export partner. On the other hand, Norway is the EU's fourth most important import partner and seventh most important export partner. In 2008, Norway's exports to the EU amounted to €91.85 billion, with most of this value coming from energy supplies and other primary products (only 14.1% were manufactured products). Meanwhile, Norwegian imports from the EU amounted to €43.58 billion, with most of this value coming from manufactured products.

== European Economic Area (EEA) ==
The EEA agreement grants Norway access to the EU's single market. From the 23,000 EU laws currently in force, the EEA has incorporated around 5,000 (in force) meaning that Norway is subject to roughly 21% of EU laws. According to Norway's Foreign Affairs (NOU 2012:2 p. 790, 795), from the legislative acts implemented from 1994 to 2010, 70% of EU directives and 17% of EU regulations in force in the EU in 2008 were in force in Norway in 2010. Overall, this means that about 28% of EU legislation in force of these two types in 2008 were in force in Norway in 2010. While the Norwegian parliament has to approve all new legislation that has "significant new obligations", this has been widely supported and usually uncontested; between 1992 and 2011, 92% of EU laws were approved unanimously, and most of the rest by a broad majority.

This arrangement facilitates the free movement of goods, capital, services, and people between the EU and EFTA members, including Norway. Free movement of goods means freedom from customs fees, where however, food and beverage are excluded (because those are subsidised by the EU). Due to customs fees, fishing and agriculture incur over €100 million of tariffs annually. Joining the European Union as a full member would eliminate these fees and lead to lower food prices in Norway. Farmers and the fishing industry oppose this as it would create additional competition for domestic producers. Free movement of people means freedom of movement for workers between Norway and EU, and that Norway is a part of the Schengen Area.

Norway has been granted participation rights (save voting rights) in several of the Union's programmes, bodies, and initiatives. These include security and defence areas like the European Defence Agency, the Nordic Battle Group, Frontex, Europol and the European Monitoring Centre for Drugs and Drug Addiction. Whether or not the country should apply for full membership has been one of the most dominant and divisive issues in modern Norwegian political debate.

Norway's total financial contribution linked to the EEA agreement consists of contributions related to the participation in these projects and partly made available to development projects for reducing social and economic disparities in the EU (EEA and Norway Grants). EEA EFTA states fund their participation in programmes and agencies by an amount corresponding to the relative size of their gross domestic product (GDP) compared to the GDP of the whole EEA. The EEA EFTA participation is hence on an equal footing with EU member states. The total EEA EFTA commitment is 2.4% of the overall EU programme budget. In 2008, Norway's contribution was €188 million. Throughout the programme period 2007–2013, the Norwegian contribution will increase substantially in parallel with the development of the EU programme budget, from €130 million in 2007 to €290 million in 2013. For the EEA and Norway Grants from 2004 to 2009, Norway provided almost €1.3 billion.

== History ==
In 1962, Norway applied for membership in the European Economic Community (EEC) with Ireland as well as fellow EFTA members Denmark and the United Kingdom having applied to join the previous year. When France rebuffed the United Kingdom's application the following year, accession negotiations with Norway and the other countries were also suspended because of their strong economic ties. This happened again in 1967.

Norway completed its negotiations for the terms to govern a Norwegian membership in the EEC on 22 January 1972. Following an overwhelming parliamentary majority in favour of joining the EEC in early 1972, the government decided to put the question to a popular referendum, scheduled for 24 and 25 September. The result was that 53.5% voted against membership and 46.5% for it. The Norwegian Labour Party government led by Trygve Bratteli resigned over the outcome of the referendum, and a coalition government led by Lars Korvald took over.

Norway entered a trade agreement with the Community following the referendum's outcome. That trade agreement continued until Norway joined the European Economic Area on 1 January 1994.

On 28 November 1994, a second referendum was held, narrowing the margin but yielding the same result: 52.2% opposed membership and 47.8% in favour, with a turn-out of 88.6%. There are currently no plans to resume their current application, which is currently frozen.

Norway was an associate member of the Western European Union until the organisation terminated in 2011.

== Potential accession of Norway to the European Union ==
Countries that could join the European Union Current members Candidate countries Applicant / potential candidate countries Membership possible Membership not possible

Norway's application for EU membership has been frozen, but not withdrawn. It could be resumed at any time following renewed domestic political will.

A major issue for Norway is its fishing resources, which are a significant part of the national economy and which would come under the Common Fisheries Policy if Norway were to accede to the EU. Norway has high GNP per capita and would have to pay a high membership fee. The country has a limited amount of agriculture and few underdeveloped areas, which means that Norway would receive little economic support from the EU. However, as of 2009, Norway has chosen to opt into many EU projects, and since its total financial contribution linked to the EEA agreement consists of contributions related to the participation in these projects, and a part made available to development projects for reducing social and economic disparities in the EU (EEA and Norway Grants), its participation is on an equal footing with that of EU member states. The total EEA EFTA commitment is 2.4% of the overall EU programme budget.

Because these positions significantly cut across ideological boundaries, various political parties have dealt with the issue differently. The Centre Party has maintained the most principled stand against membership, and though parties such as the Norwegian Conservative Party and the Norwegian Labour Party support membership in their platform, they allow for a minority to oppose it. Most dramatically, the Norwegian Liberal Party split over the issue in 1972 at the famed party conference in Røros and did not reunite until 1989.

The EU membership issue crosses Norwegian politics's traditional left–right axis. Since the Labour Party lost its dominance in Norwegian politics, all governments have been a coalition of several political parties. Because the issue almost certainly would break up any conceivable government coalition (except perhaps a grand coalition of Labour and the Conservatives), no government has raised the subject, and no opposition party has stated any desire to do so either.

Disagreements on this issue have created divisiveness within families and local communities. Although there is a general pattern that urban communities favour membership and rural communities do not, there have been vocal minorities in every area of Norway.

Complicating the matter has been that a great variety of political and emotional factors have been raised in the debate. Opponents of EU membership on the left do so because of opposition to conservative economic and political forces that concern them within Europe; opponents on the right are concerned about an infringement on Norwegian culture; and others are opposed in principle to compromising Norwegian sovereignty. On 9 April 2022, Governing Mayor of Oslo Raymond Johansen hoped that it was the time for EU membership debate, stating, "The EU is not only our best guarantor of peace and democracy. It is also the best answer we have to many of the challenges facing Norwegian society."

=== The Greenland crisis and EU accession ===
The Greenland crisis of 2026 led to renewed calls for EU accession from multiple political parties and major Norwegian newspapers. The Green Party leader Arild Hermstad called the government's refusal to open an EU debate "uansvarlig" (irresponsible), arguing that Norway needed a "plan B" beyond NATO given the security situation.

Adresseavisen published a leader article on 6 January 2026 stating that "This is about what is important for Norway. It is a question of our national security. It is irresponsible to pretend otherwise." Bergens Tidende editorialized on 9 January that Norway "cannot afford to stand alone" and must prepare for "the time after NATO."

Incoming Conservative Party leader Ine Eriksen Søreide criticized the Labour government's position as "very defensive," stating that "putting a lid on a debate—then I think you are very afraid of knowledge." Conservative MP Nikolai Astrup wrote in Aftenposten on 11 January 2026 that "It is time to talk about Norwegian EU membership. Anything else is irresponsible," arguing that Europe must "hang together. The alternative is to be hanged separately."

=== Norwegian political parties' positions ===
Currently, parties supporting or opposing EU membership are to be found in both right-wing and left-wing coalitions: as a result, most governments contain pro- and anti-EU elements. To avoid further debates concerning EU membership, anti-EU parties usually require "suicide paragraphs" in government coalition agreements, meaning that if any party in the coalition officially begins a new debate on EU membership, the coalition government will be dissolved. This has been true for both the previous centre-right Bondevik government and the centre-left Stoltenberg government.

Norwegian parliamentary political parties' position
Party	Position on EU membership	Position on EEA membership
Labour	Support	Support
Conservative	Support	Support
Progress	Opposed	Support
Centre	Opposed	Opposed
Socialist Left	Opposed	Opposed
Liberal	Support	Support
Christian Democratic	Opposed	Support
Green	Support	Support
Red	Opposed	Opposed

=== Opinion polling ===
Norway EU membership polls since 2002

On average, Norwegian voters oppose Norwegian membership in the European Union. The average polling results since 2022 indicate that around 55% of Norwegian voters oppose EU membership, although the most recent polling has shown this fall under 50% (see below).

According to 2023 polling data, most voters remain opposed to EU membership. However, many Norwegians are changing their position on future membership due to the Russian invasion of Ukraine. This trend has continued and after both opponents and supports of Norwegian EU membership reached the same level of approximately 40%, 63% of Norwegians now say they want another referendum on EU membership.

Polls on Norwegian membership of the European Union
Dates conducted	Pollster	Support	Opposed	Ref.
Aug 2026	Iceland voted against resuming EU membership negotiations			
Feb 2026	Opinion	38%	48%	
Dec 2025	Respons	33%	53%	
Apr 2025	Sentio	33.2%	41.8%	
Apr 2025	Opinion	41%	48%	
Mar 2025	Norstat	37%	43%	
Mar 2025	Respons	35%	45%	
Mar 2025	Opinion	40%	49%	
Feb 2025	Opinion	33%	53%	
Nov 2024	Opinion	34,9%	46,7%	
Nov 2023	Opinion	31%	52%	
Aug 2023	Opinion	35%	54%	
Apr 2023	Sentio	33%	56%	
Feb 2023	Opinion	31%	53%	
Nov 2022	Sentio	27.2%	55.8%	
Jun 2022	Sentio	35.3%	48.8%	
Mar 2022	Norstat	26%	53%	
Jan 2020	the United Kingdom leaves the European Union			
Nov 2019	Sentio	28%	60%	
Jun 2018	Sentio	22%	67%	
Aug 2016	Ipsos MMI	16%	66%	
Jun 2016	Sentio	19.6%	70.9%	
Dec 2015	Sentio	18.1%	72.0%	
Aug 2014	Sentio	17.8%	70.5%	
Jan 2013	Sentio	18.7%	70.8%	
Jul 2012	Sentio	17.2%	74.8%	
Oct 2011	Sentio	18.6%	70.8%	
Oct 2011	Synovate	12%	72%	
Jul 2011	Sentio	20.1%	68.8%	
Jul 2011	Sentio	17.1%	73.4%	
May 2011	Response	29%	71%	
Jan 2011	Sentio	22.5%	65.9%	
Sep 2010	Sentio	24.9%	64.9%	
Aug 2010	Sentio	26%	62%	
Jul 2010	Sentio	25.3%	66.1%	
Jul 2010	Norstat	25%	66%	
May 2010	Sentio	30.3%	56.9%	
May 2010	Response	26%	62%	
May 2010	Norstat	32.3%	55%	
Apr 2010	Sentio	36.3%	50.1%	
Feb 2010	Sentio	33%	53.4%	
Nov 2009	Sentio	42%	58%	
Oct 2009	Sentio	41.4%	45.6%	
Sep 2009	Sentio	35%	52.2%	
Jun 2009	Norstat	40.6%	50.3%	
May 2009	Response	42%	58%	
May 2009	Norstat	38.6%	49%	
Apr 2009	Sentio	34.9%	53.3%	
Mar 2009	Sentio	33%	54.9%	
Feb 2009	Sentio	35.1%	54.7%	
Jan 2009	Sentio	32.5%	52.8%	
Dec 2008	Sentio	37.5%	50.7%	
May 2008	Response	40%	60%	
Nov 2007	Response	42%	58%	
Apr 2007	Response	45%	55%	
Nov 2006	Response	41%	59%	
Sep 2006	Response	45%	55%	
May 2006	Response	45%	55%	
Jun 2005	Sentio	36%	51%	
Sep 2003	Sentio	37%	38%	

== Norway's foreign relations with EU member states ==
- Austria
- Belgium
- Bulgaria
- Croatia
- Cyprus
- Czech Republic
- Denmark
- Estonia
- Finland
- France
- Germany
- Greece
- Hungary
- (Republic of Ireland) Ireland
- Italy
- Latvia
- Lithuania
- Luxembourg
- Malta
- Netherlands
- Poland
- Portugal
- Romania
- Slovakia
- Slovenia
- Spain
- Sweden

== Diplomatic relations between Norway and EU member states ==
Country	Norwegian embassy	Reciprocal embassy	Notes
Austria	Vienna	Oslo	Norwegian Permanent Mission to OSCE in Vienna
Belgium	Brussels	Oslo	Norwegian Mission to the EU and Permanent Delegation to NATO in Brussels
Bulgaria	Sofia	Oslo	
Croatia	Zagreb	Oslo	
Cyprus	Nicosia	Oslo	
Czech Republic	Prague	Oslo	
Denmark	Copenhagen	Oslo	
Estonia	Tallinn	Oslo	
Finland	Helsinki	Oslo	
France	Paris	Oslo	Norwegian Mission to OECD and UNESCO in Paris. and in Council of Europe in Strasbourg
Germany	Berlin; Consulate General: Hamburg; Consulate: Düsseldorf	Oslo	
Greece	Athens	Oslo	
Hungary	Budapest	Oslo	
Ireland	Dublin	Oslo	
Italy	Rome	Oslo	
Latvia	Riga	Oslo	
Lithuania	Vilnius	Oslo	
Luxembourg	Luxembourg City	Oslo	
Malta	Valletta	Oslo	
Netherlands	The Hague; Consulate General: Rotterdam	Oslo	
Poland	Warsaw	Oslo	
Portugal	Lisbon	Oslo	
Romania	Bucharest	Oslo	
Slovakia	Bratislava	Oslo	
Slovenia	Ljubljana	Oslo	
Spain	Madrid; Consulate General: Barcelona; Consulate: Alicante	Oslo	
Sweden	Stockholm	Oslo	

== See also ==
- 1972 Norwegian EC membership referendum
- 1994 Norwegian EU membership referendum
- Borders with EU members
  - Finland–Norway border
  - Norway–Sweden border
- Enlargement of the EU
- Greenland-EU relations
- Iceland-EU relations
- Liechtenstein-EU relations
- No to the EU (Norway)
- Potential enlargement of the EU
- United Kingdom-EU relations
- Youth against the EU (Norway)
