= Anne Lande Peters =

Norwegian translator (born 1967)

Anne Lande Peters (born 1967) is a Norwegian translator.

== Early life and education ==
She was born and grew up in Japan, and studied theatre at Waseda University. Her Norwegian roots are in Setesdal.

== Work ==
Among her translations from Japanese to Norwegian are Banana Yoshimoto and Yukio Mishima. Her translation of Kobo Abe's Mahō no chōku was included in the Norwegian anthology of short Japanese texts, Knakketiknakk: Korte fortellinger fra Japan 1895–2012 (2018). For this book, Peters was a co-nominee to win the 2019 Norwegian Critics Prize for Translation.

After translating Yukio Mishima to Norwegian, she was commissioned in 2008 to translate Henrik Ibsen's Hedda Gabler for the New National Theatre Tokyo, followed thereafter by The Lady from the Sea in 2015. Peters has written about various challenges when translating Ibsen to Japanese, among others the Norwegian attitudes to weather as well as swear words used by Ibsen, which were consequently changed from religious to scatological profanities.

In 2022 she was decorated with the Royal Norwegian Order of Merit for strengthening Japan–Norway cultural relations.
