= Cyprus–Norway relations =

Bilateral relations between Cyprus and Norway

- Cyprus: Norway

Cyprus–Norway relations are the bilateral relations between Cyprus and Norway. Diplomatic relations were established on 22 March 1963. The government in Cyprus considers that the "bilateral relations between Cyprus and Norway are excellent in all fields". Neither country has resident ambassadors.

== Diplomatic relations ==
Cyprus is represented in Norway through its embassy in Stockholm, Sweden, and two honorary consulates, one in Oslo and the second in Kristiansand. Norway is represented in Cyprus through its embassy in Athens, Greece, and an honorary consulate in Nicosia. Both countries are full members of the Council of Europe. Diplomatic relations were established on 22 March 1963. On 7 April 1998, Svein Ole Sæther became the non-resident Norwegian Ambassador to Cyprus stationed in Tel Aviv. He said "[bilateral relations] have been enhanced over the last years, not least due to tourism." Norway used the opportunity to reaffirm its support to a peaceful solution to the Cyprus dispute and said it would support Cyprus' entry into the European Union.

== Agreements ==
On 21 August 1951, there was a Consular Convention and an Exchange of Letters relating to establishing diplomatic relations. On 2 May 1951, there was a Convention for the Avoidance of Double Taxation and the Prevention of Fiscal Evasion with respect to Taxes on Income. On 17 May 1962, there was an Exchange of Letters constituting an Agreement on the Abolition of Visa Requirement in Nicosia. On 5 March 1963, there was an Agreement on Commercial Scheduled Air Transport signed in London.

== Cyprus as tax haven ==
The taxation levels in Cyprus are considerably lower than in Norway, and Cyprus has actively courted Norwegians to move to Cyprus. Among the Norwegians who moved to Cyprus is the shipping billionaire John Fredriksen, who was the richest man in Norway.

In 1996, tax rules in Norway were changed to keep shipping companies competitive and under the Norwegian flag as ships changed their registry to Cyprus. By 2008, changes to the tonnage tax regime to harmonize them with the European Union forced some companies to register in Cyprus. Norwegian Service rig company Prosafe moved their headquarters to Cyprus.

Several Norwegian retirees also moved to Cyprus; this too is largely to benefit from the lower tax rate on Cyprus and the minimal crime.

== Resident diplomatic missions ==
- Cyprus is accredited to Norway from its embassy in Stockholm, Sweden.
- Norway is accredited to Cyprus from its embassy in Athens, Greece.

== See also ==
- Foreign relations of Cyprus
- Foreign relations of Norway
