= Nepal–Norway relations =

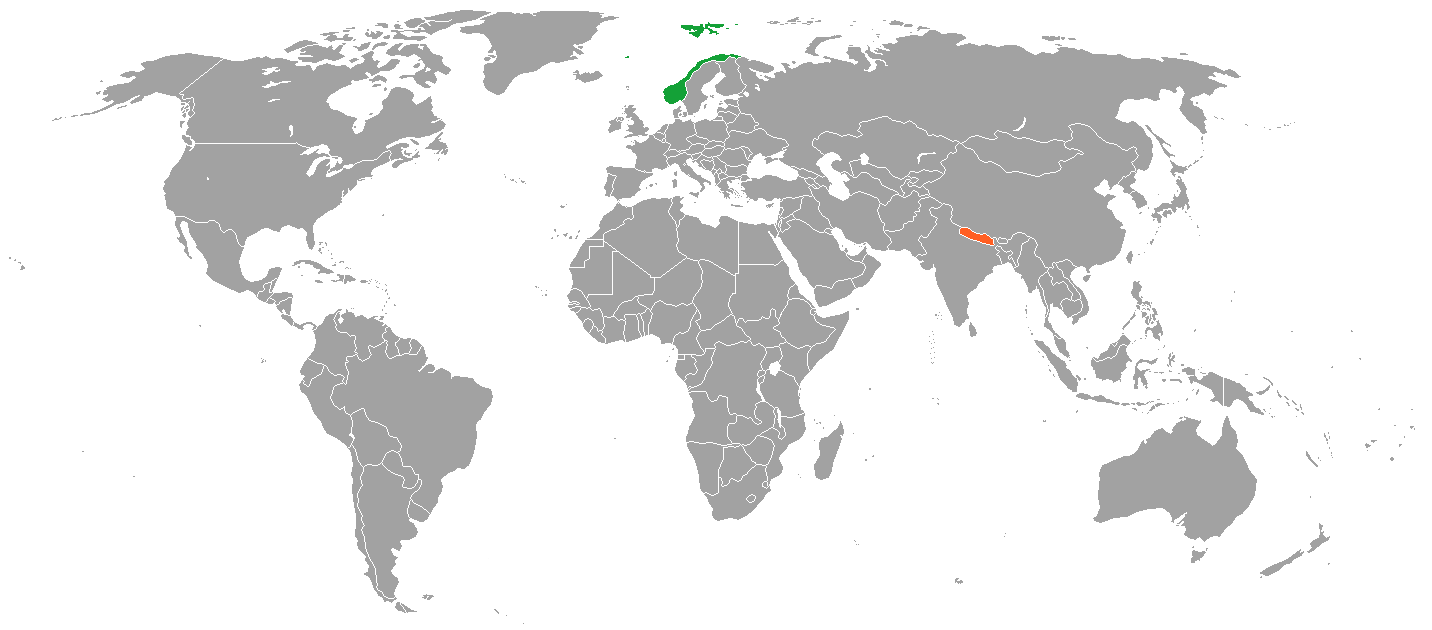
- Norway: Nepal

Nepal–Norway relations are bilateral relations between Nepal and Norway. Diplomatic relations were established on 26 January 1973. Norway established an embassy in Kathmandu in 2000. Nepal has a non-resident ambassador in Copenhagen.

== State visits ==
In 2008, Norwegian Prime Minister Jens Stoltenberg and Minister of the Environment and International Development Erik Solheim visited Nepal. In 2009, the Nepalese Prime Minister Prachanda visited Norway.

== Norwegian aid ==
Norway's aid to Nepal was around 32 million USD in 2017. Norwegian aid prioritizes education, good governance and energy.

== Embassy bombing ==
In May 2008, a small bomb exploded outside the Norwegian embassy in Kathmandu. No one was injured and there was no claim of responsibility. A spokesperson for the Norwegian foreign ministry said that Norway's support for the peace process in Nepal could have been a motive.

== See also ==
- Foreign relations of Nepal
- Foreign relations of Norway
