= Norway–Sudan relations =

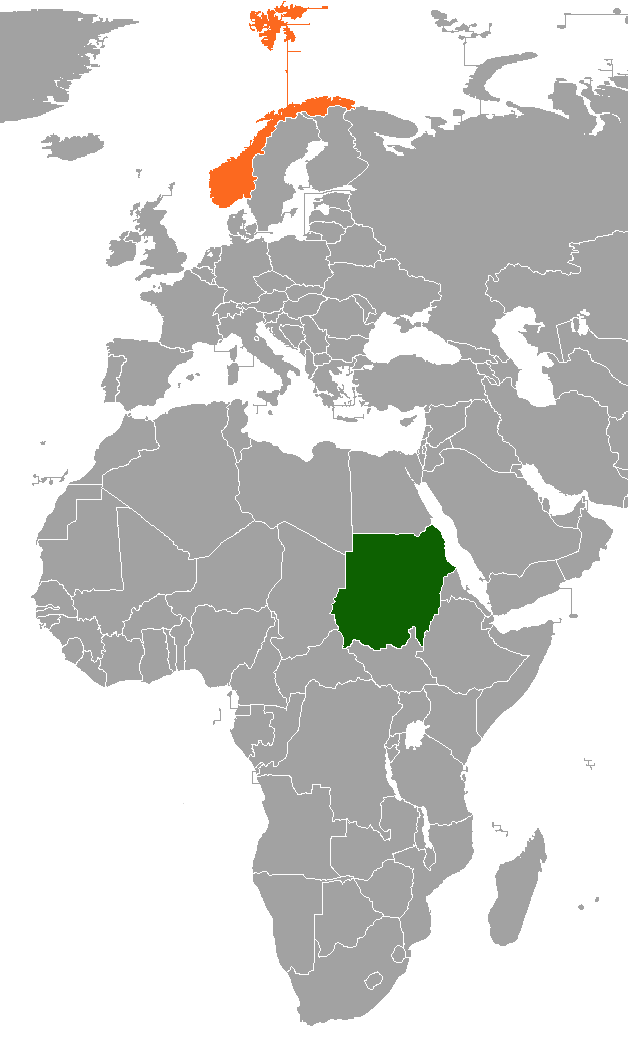

- Sudan: Norway

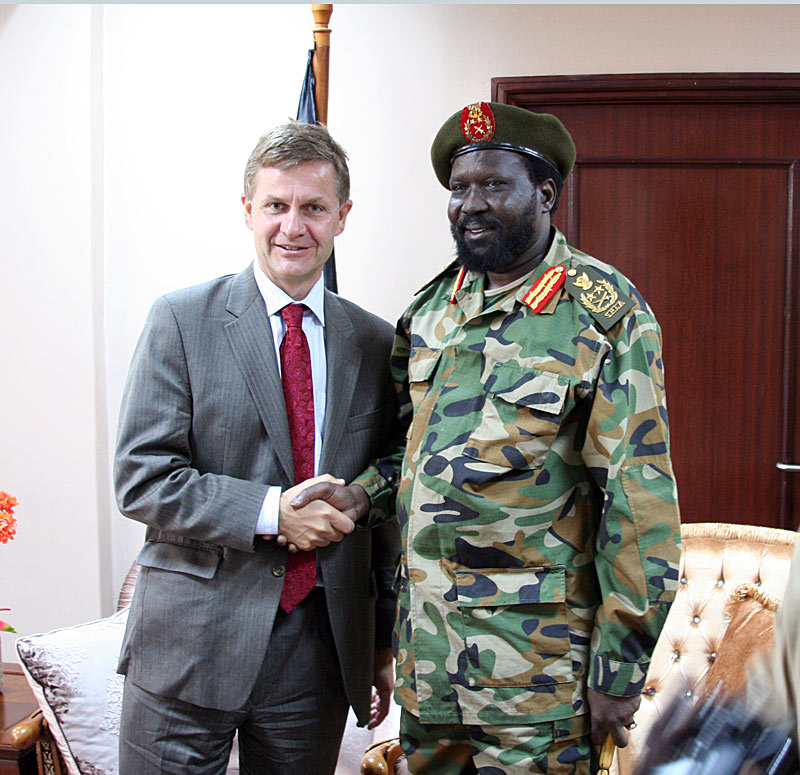
Erik Solheim, Norwegian Minister of the Environment and International Development, meeting with Salva Kiir, then Vice President of Sudan, during a visit to Sudan in 2007

Norway–Sudan relations are the bilateral relations between Norway and Sudan. Sudan has an embassy in Oslo. Norway has an embassy in Khartoum.

Norway is a donor of humanitarian aid to Sudan. Norway played a key role in the negotiations for the Comprehensive Peace Agreement between Northern Sudan and Southern Sudan to end the Second Sudanese Civil War.

== History ==
In 2005, Norway helped broker the Comprehensive Peace Agreement and hosted a humanitarian aid conference to raise international money for the Sudan. In 2006 Norway was one of the few European nations that contributed to the United Nations peacekeeping force during the War in Darfur. 170 specialist troops were sent. In 2007 Erik Solheim, the Norwegian Minister for International Cooperation visited the Sudan and met with Salva Kiir. At a joint press conference it was announced that Norway would provide $US 100 million a year for development. In 2008 Norway said it would provide $US 490 million in humanitarian aid for the period of 2008 through 2011. The announcement was made during a three-day donor conference hosted by Norway. The total amount raised at the meeting was US$ 4.8 billion. At the meeting Sudanese Vice President Ali Osman Taha called for increased support. Hilde Frafjord Johnson, the former Norwegian aid minister who helped broker the 2005 peace accord, said the peace effort suffered two setbacks: the death of John Garang in the 2005 plane crash, and the continued fighting in Darfur.

== Diaspora ==
As of 2025, there are 5,606 Sudanese immigrants living in Norway. There are 1,996 Norwegian born to Sudanese parents. Most of them are Christian refugees and people from Darfur.

== See also ==
- Foreign relations of Norway
- Foreign relations of Sudan
- People of African descent in Norway
