= New Zealand–Norway relations =

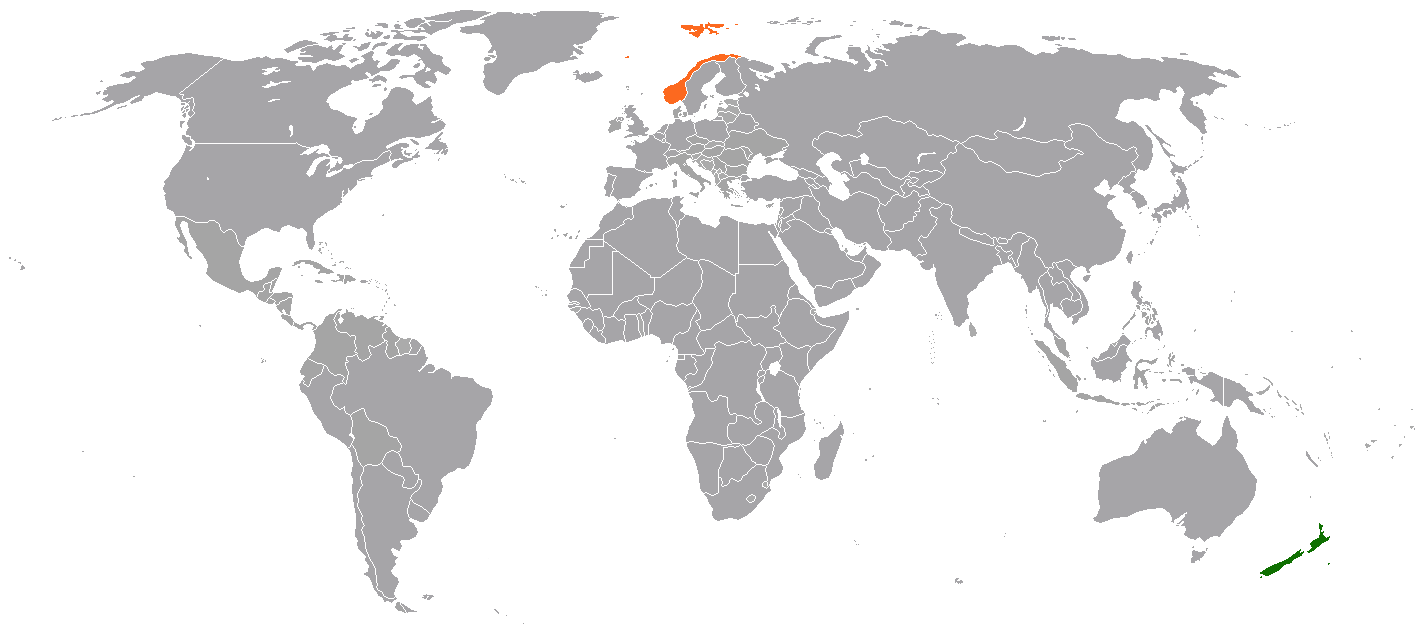

- New Zealand: Norway

New Zealand–Norway relations are foreign relations between Norway and New Zealand. The two countries established diplomatic relations in 1905, after Norway gained independence. New Zealand's embassy in Stockholm, Sweden represents New Zealand diplomatically in Norway. Norway is represented in New Zealand by the Norwegian Embassy in Canberra, Australia. Around 1,400 Norwegians live in New Zealand and 929 New Zealanders live in Norway.

Territorial claims in Antarctica: New Zealand Norway

Of all the Scandinavian countries, only Norway shares a land border with New Zealand - at the South Pole in Antarctica where Norway's claim to Queen Maud Land and New Zealand's claim to the Ross Dependency meet.

== International issues ==
New Zealand joined 11 other countries in 2006 in delivering a formal diplomatic protest to the Norwegian Foreign Ministry in Oslo over Norway's plans to increase its whaling activities.

== Trade ==
In the year ending in December 2008, New Zealand exported goods and services to Norway to the value of NZ$ 69.2 million. The main exports included fishing vessels, lamb and mutton, aluminium, onions, apples and pears, yachts, and navigational instruments. New Zealand imports from Norway had a value of NZ$ 73 million. The main imports included fertilizers, trucks and vans, seats, medical equipment, fishing vessels, and agricultural machinery.

Reidar Sveaas, a director of P&O and honorary consul to Auckland said in 2000 that excellent opportunities existed for New Zealand to trade with the world's second largest oil-producing country, Norway.

== Investment ==
Norske Skog of Norway operates the Tasman Mill, outside the town of Kawerau in New Zealand. It represents one of the most prominent Nordic investments in New Zealand industry.

== Migration ==
Norsewood in New Zealand's Seventy Mile Bush started as a Norwegian settlement in 1872. In 1881 New Zealand had 1,271 Norway-born residents, in 1901 there were 1,278.

== Official visits ==
In over 100 years of relations, there have only been two state visits between these countries. In 2004, Helen Clark, became the first New Zealand Prime Minister to ever visit Norway. She said that both countries see eye-to-eye on almost everything, except the commercial harvesting of whales. Other official visits have included:

=== New Zealand official visits to Norway ===
- Anne Tolley, Minister of Education, June 2009
- Margaret Wilson, Speaker of the House of Representatives, leading a Parliamentary Delegation, October 2007
- Phil Goff, Minister of Trade, Defence, Disarmament and Arms Control, January 2007
- Silvia Cartwright Governor General-designate, March 2001
- Trevor Mallard Minister of Sport, November 2000
- Max Bradford Minister of Energy, 1997
- Don McKinnon Minister of Foreign Affairs & Trade, March 1996
- Rob Storey Minister of Transport, November 1992

=== Norwegian official visits to New Zealand ===
- Kjell Magne Bondevik Prime Minister, March 2005
- Kristin Clemet Minister of Education and Research, October 2004
- Minister of Transport and Communications, January 1995 and March 1993

== See also ==
- Foreign relations of New Zealand
- Foreign relations of Norway
