= Norway–Syria relations =

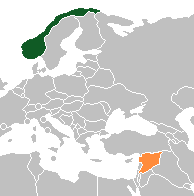
- Norway: Syria

Norway–Syria relations are the bilateral and diplomatic relations between the two countries. It refers to the diplomatic relationship between Norway and Syria. Both countries established diplomatic relations in 1948. After the Arab Spring and the onset of the Syrian Civil War occurred, Norway suspended its embassy in Damascus. It was reopened following the fall of the Assad regime.

== History ==
Norway and Syria established diplomatic relations on 11 August 1948. This formal recognition marked the beginning of bilateral ties between the two nations.

=== Relations during the Syrian conflict ===
In March 2012, amid the escalating Syrian Civil War, Norway temporarily closed its embassy in Damascus due to the deteriorating security situation. Foreign Minister Jonas Gahr Støre emphasized that the closure served as both a security measure and a political signal in response to the conflict. A Norwegian diplomat remained stationed at the Danish embassy in Damascus to maintain limited diplomatic contact.

In 2015, Norway's Permanent Representative to the UN in Geneva, Ambassador Steffen Kongstad, emphasized in his address the burden placed on Syria's neighboring countries hosting refugees, urging for coordinated international efforts to support both refugees and host communities. He also delivered a statement on behalf of the Nordic countries at the 28th session of the UN Human Rights Council, condemning human rights violations in Syria, including sexual violence and the influx of foreign fighters, and calling for accountability and a political resolution to the conflict.

=== Norway's humanitarian support to Syria ===
Throughout the Syrian conflict, Norway had been a significant contributor to humanitarian efforts. From 2016 to 2019, Norway provided 10 billion NOK to support Syrians and Syrian refugees in neighboring countries such as Jordan and Lebanon. In 2024, Norway's contribution was 569 million NOK, including approximately 490 million NOK for humanitarian aid and 79 million NOK directed at stabilization efforts.

Norwegian support had been directed at various sectors within Syria, including healthcare, food security, education, mine clearance, infrastructure rehabilitation, and support for small businesses. Assistance had also focused on measures for youth in and around camps for internally displaced persons, as well as support for women. Key partners in these efforts include the Norwegian Refugee Council, Norwegian People's Aid, Norwegian Church Aid, Save the Children, NORWAC, CARE, the Red Cross Movement, and the United Nations.

=== Post-Assad relations ===
Following the fall of the Assad regime, Norwegian Foreign Minister Espen Barth Eide led a delegation to visit Syria on 19 January 2025. During his visit, he met with Ahmed al-Sharaa, then the de facto leader of Syria. The purpose of the visit was to engage in dialogue regarding future cooperation, focusing on rebuilding efforts and humanitarian assistance in the post-conflict period.

== See also ==
- Foreign relations of Norway
- Foreign relations of Syria
