= Mongolia–Norway relations =

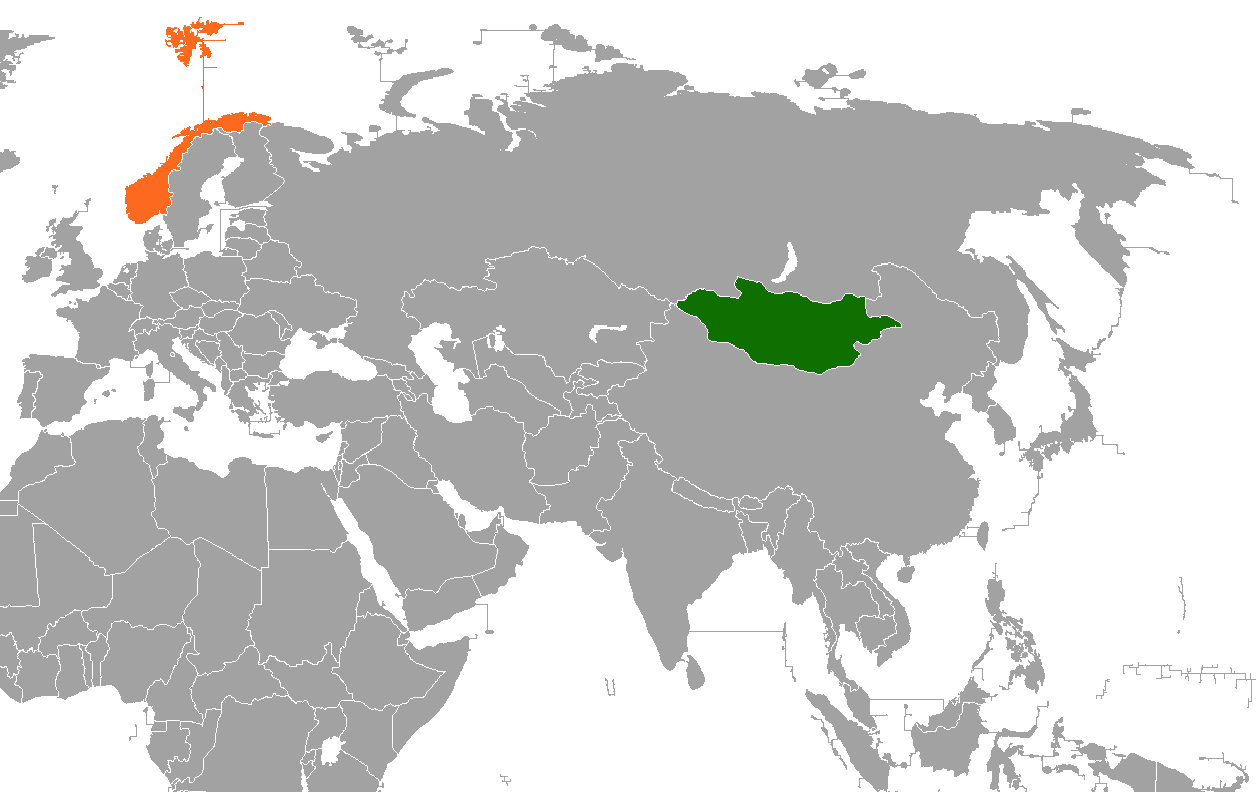

- Mongolia: Norway

Mongolia–Norway relations refers to the bilateral relationship of Mongolia and Norway. Diplomatic relations were established on 11 January 1968. Neither country has a resident embassy. Mongolia is represented to Norway via its embassy in Brussels, while Norway is represented in Mongolia by its embassy in Beijing. There is also a Norwegian honorary consulate general in the Mongolian capital Ulaanbaatar. Mongolia plans to establish an embassy in Stockholm and move the representative in Brussels. The move is to facilitate the development of bilateral contacts and have stronger relations between Norway and Mongolia.

== Humanitarian aid ==
There are currently about 20 Norwegians in Mongolia, and most of them are related to the work of the Norwegian Lutheran Mission (NLM). NLM has performed development activities in Mongolia since 1994. NLM has 16 envoys in Mongolia working on four humanitarian aid projects funded by Norwegian Agency for Development Cooperation. The organization also provides financial support to churches and other Christian organizations.

The Norwegian Agency for Development Cooperation also funds other programs in Mongolia. Their Save the Children Norway program provides money to the Mongolian Child Rights Centre.

The Government of Norway has promoted the commercialization of super-insulating materials in the housing sector in Mongolia in coordination with the Global Environment Facility, the United Nations Development Program Mongolia, and the Mongolian Ministry of Infrastructure and provided technical and financial support in building energy efficient housing.

In 2007, the total Norwegian aid to Mongolia amounted to 5.4 million NOK.

== Official Visits ==
There has traditionally been only modest diplomatic contact between Mongolia and Norway, though according to Norwegian foreign minister Jonas Gahr Støre bilateral relations have been "good and fruitful" ever since they were established. Haakon, the Crown Prince of Norway, visited Mongolia in November 2008 as the goodwill ambassador for the United Nations Development Programme. Mongolia was at a crossroads and had to decide if it will make full of use its economic growth to reach the Millennium Development Goals. At the Kaan Bank Theatre in Mongoliahe said:

[It] is quite interesting to note that Mongolia and Norway were both at their height of power about the same time at the beginning of the second millennium. ... In modern times, we share a relatively recent independent statehood. Both our countries are committed to a democratic way of government and to the rule of law. In this regard, I am happy to learn that Norway has given support to the UNDP’s efforts aimed at strengthening democratic institutions in Mongolia, and that there are fruitful relations between the Parliaments in our respective countries. Both our countries are large in size with comparatively small populations. We share the fortune of having a significant wealth of natural resources, upon which our prosperity largely depends. ... As small nations, Norway and Mongolia also share a belief in multilateral co-operation based on international law, with the United Nations at the centre.

Nambaryn Enkhbayar, the Mongolian president used the visit as an opportunity to ask the crown prince for humanitarian aid from Norway.

The Crown Prince's visit marked the 40th anniversary of the establishment of diplomatic ties between Norway and Mongolia, which also saw the foreign ministers of the two nations exchange congratulations.

Kirsti Kolle Grøndahl, the President of the Norwegian Parliament, along with Jørgen Kosmo visited Mongolia, in 1999 and again in 2004. In 2001 deputy-speaker J. Byambadorj visited Norway where he met with the speaker of the Norwegian parliament on the cooperation between the two countries including developmental aid.

Vice President of the Norwegian Parliament Carl I. Hagen represented Norway during Mongolia's 800-year anniversary in 2006. Jørgen Kosmo, now Auditor General of Norway, visited the country in 2007 to launch an aid-funded collaboration on capacity building. The chairman of the Mongolian parliament (the State Great Hural) visited Norway in 1997 and 2006. There have been Mongolian foreign minister visits to Norway in 2000 and 2007.

== Resident diplomatic missions ==
- Mongolia is accredited to Norway from its embassy in Stockholm, Sweden.
- Norway is accredited to Mongolia from its embassy in Beijing, China.

== See also ==
- Foreign relations of Mongolia
- Foreign relations of Norway
