= Norway–Saudi Arabia relations =

- Norway: Saudi Arabia

Norway–Saudi Arabia relations are foreign relations between Norway and Saudi Arabia.

Saudi Arabia has an embassy in Oslo. Norway has an embassy in Riyadh and a consulate-general in Jeddah.

There are 84 Norwegians living in Saudi Arabia, according to the Norwegian embassy. The Muslim community in Tromsø wants to build the world's northernmost Mosque. With the help of funding from Saudi Arabia, the Mosque is planned as a local landmark building. But, the (then) Norwegian Minister of Foreign Affairs Jonas Gahr Støre told VG: "We could have just said no, in principle the ministry doesn't approve such things. But when we were first asked, we used the opportunity to add that an approval would be paradoxical as long as it's a crime to establish a Christian community in Saudi Arabia."

== Resident diplomatic missions ==
- Norway has an embassy in Riyadh.
- Saudi Arabia has an embassy in Oslo.

== See also ==
- Foreign relations of Norway
- Foreign relations of Saudi Arabia
