= Norway–Ukraine relations =

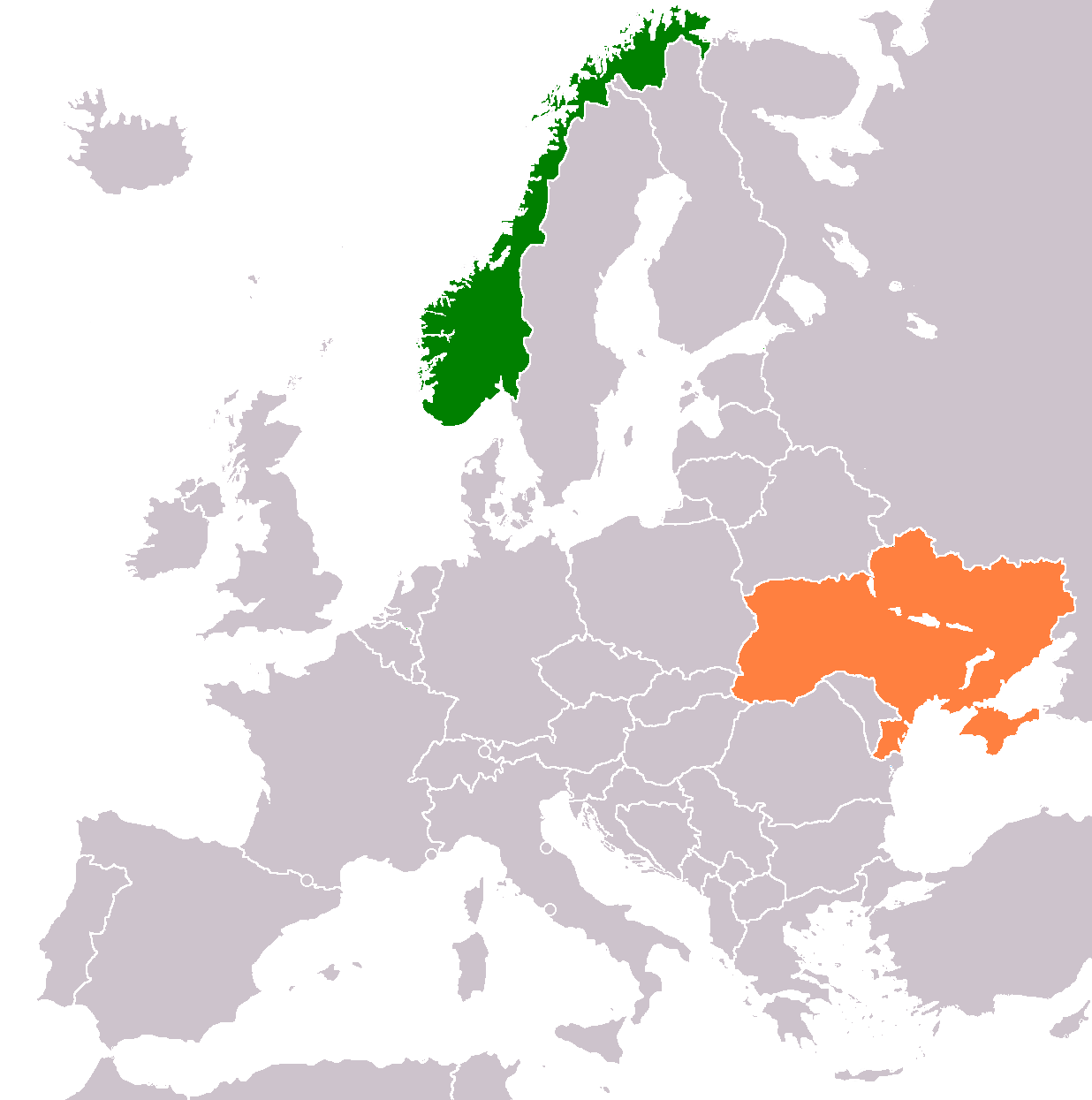
- Norway: Ukraine

Norway–Ukraine relations are foreign relations between Norway and Ukraine. Diplomatic relations between the two countries were established on 5 February 1992. Norway is a member of NATO which Ukraine applied for in 2022. Both countries are members of the OSCE, Council of Europe, World Trade Organization and United Nations. Norway recognized Ukraine's independence in 1991.

== Historical relations ==
The Normans participated in the formation of the first Kievan state (in the Scandinavian sagas - Gardariki). In the 8th - 19th centuries, the Scandinavian population - Swedes, Norwegians and Danes - were called Normans. The famous chronicle of Nestor "The Tale of Bygone Years" under the year 862 contains a poetic legend about the elders of Slavic tribes who invited the Varangians to come to Russia and become its rulers.

And there was no truth in them, and family rose up against family, and there were strifes among them, and they began to fight among themselves. And they said: "Let us seek for ourselves a prince who would rule over us and govern us according to the agreement, according to the law." They went across the sea to the Varangians, to the Rus. For that is what those Varangians were called - Rus, just as some are called Sveys, and others - Normans, Angles, and others - Goths, - so are these. The Chud, Slovenes, Krivichi and all told the Rus: "Our land is great and generous to all, but there is no order in it. Go and reign and rule over us."

The legend tells of three brothers - Rurik, Sineus and Truvor, who took their families and began to rule in the Slavic cities of Ladoga, Beloozero and Izborsk. From these Varangians, according to the chronicler, the Rus' land got its name. Later, two years later, the younger brothers died, and all power over the northern East Slavic tribes of the Slovenes and Krivichs was concentrated in the hands of Rurik. Historians have long come to the conclusion about the mythical nature of the Rurik brothers. Nevertheless, there is no doubt that Rurik really existed, and, as the chronicle says, he came to Russia with his relatives and wife. Thus, according to the "Tale of Bygone Years", Rurik became the founder of the princely dynasty in Russia.

It is known that the Varangian squads were used by the Rus' princes to participate in military campaigns. Such military assistance was needed mainly for external military campaigns of Kievan Rus' (for example, the campaigns of Oleg, Igor and Vladimir against Byzantium; the war of Yaroslav the Wise with the Pechenegs), but the Varangians were also used to clarify the relations between the princes in internecine strife. In addition, the texts of the treaties of 907, 911 and 944 between Rus' and Byzantium indicate that among the ambassadors there were people with Scandinavian names. The Scandinavians in Rus' were not only mercenaries, but also diplomats.

In the sources of the history of Kievan Rus, there is much evidence of the participation of the Danes and Swedes in Russo-Scandinavian medieval relations. There are also facts of relations between Kievan Rus and Norway, although they are less numerous. An example of this is the archaeological finds of silver coins, in Nes, minted in Kievan Rus during the times of Vladimir and Yaroslav.

One of the most famous facts of that time was the marriage of Yaroslav the Wise's daughter Elisiv to the Norwegian prince, and later the future king of Norway (1045-1066), Harald III the Severe.

=== Relations during the 20th century ===
Norway recognized the independence of Ukraine on 24 December 1991. Diplomatic relations between Ukraine and the Kingdom of Norway were established on 5 February 1992. The Embassy of the Kingdom of Norway in Ukraine was opened in Kyiv in 1992.

In October 2001, the Diplomatic Mission of Ukraine to the Kingdom of Norway was established in Oslo, which in September 2004 was transformed into the Embassy of Ukraine in this state.

=== Trade and economic cooperation ===
Trade and economic cooperation is actively developing. Analysis of statistical data shows a stable trend towards an increase in the volume of bilateral trade between Ukraine and Norway by an average of 30% in recent years, except for 2009 (due to the global financial crisis). The main export items from Ukraine are floating marine and river vessels (45.9 %), ferrous metals and products from them (32.4 %), inorganic chemical products (17.5 %), transport equipment, wood and wood products. The main import items from Norway to Ukraine are: fish and seafood (about 80 % of the structure of Norwegian exports), nickel and nickel products, electrical machinery and equipment, electrical equipment and devices, pharmaceutical products..

Norway ranks 33rd among 125 investor countries in terms of direct investment in Ukraine. In 2010, 33 enterprises with Norwegian capital operated in Ukraine. More than two-thirds of Norwegian investments are made in the communications sector (71.2 million USD). In addition, the objects of investment are real estate, publishing, agriculture, etc.

Since 2008, the Norwegian-Ukrainian Chamber of Commerce and Industry has been operating in Oslo, which includes 33 business entities. The Chamber promotes the expansion of cooperation between Ukraine and Norway in the areas of trade and industrial technologies, provides information services on the assessment of the economic situation in Norway and Ukraine, and organizes various events and conferences to disseminate information about trade and investment opportunities in Ukraine. Both private and public sector companies interested in cooperation between industrialists of Norway and Ukraine can become members of the Chamber of Commerce and Industry.

=== Humanitarian cooperation ===
Cooperation in the cultural and humanitarian spheres is developing less well. The necessary contractual and legal basis is still lacking here. This is due to the fact that, although the Norwegian government encourages the country's cooperation in the humanitarian sphere with other states in principle, the issues of practical implementation of such cooperation are left to the discretion of its direct participants - cultural and educational institutions, relevant public organizations, etc. In the vast majority of cases, such institutions are quite small and often face problems with financial support for their activities. This, of course, negatively affects the development of their bilateral cooperation in the relevant areas with foreign organizations, including Ukrainian ones.

Norway also helps to solve the problem related to the social adaptation of military personnel released into the reserve from the Armed Forces of Ukraine. Evidence of this is the "Ukraine-Norway" project - "Professional retraining of retired military personnel of the Armed Forces of Ukraine and other law enforcement agencies, members of their families and assistance in their employment", which has been implemented since 2003 by the International Fund for Social Adaptation in Ukraine with the assistance of the Kingdom of Norway. Over the ten years of its existence, the project has become one of the largest international projects in Ukraine. About 5,000 military personnel and members of their families have used the project's services.

The project participants were leading universities of Ukraine and public organizations of veterans of the Armed Forces of Ukraine. In the period 2003-2007, the project was funded by the Ministry of Defense of Norway, and since 2008 - by the Ministry of Foreign Affairs of Norway. The University of Nordland (Budo, Norway) remains a permanent partner of the project. The long-term goal of the project: to reduce the impact of negative social consequences of economic reforms and reforms of the defense sector of Ukraine for retired military personnel and their families and to promote the development of cooperation between the two countries.

Since 2014, the Ukrainian-Scandinavian Center has been operating in Ukraine, the purpose of which is to promote the development of relations between Ukraine and the countries of Scandinavia (including Norway) in the cultural, educational and social spheres. In particular, in 2016, the Ukrainian-Scandinavian Center, together with the ChNU, held the first Ukrainian-Norwegian summer school, which involved 30 students from Norway and Ukraine.

=== Russian Invasion of Ukraine ===
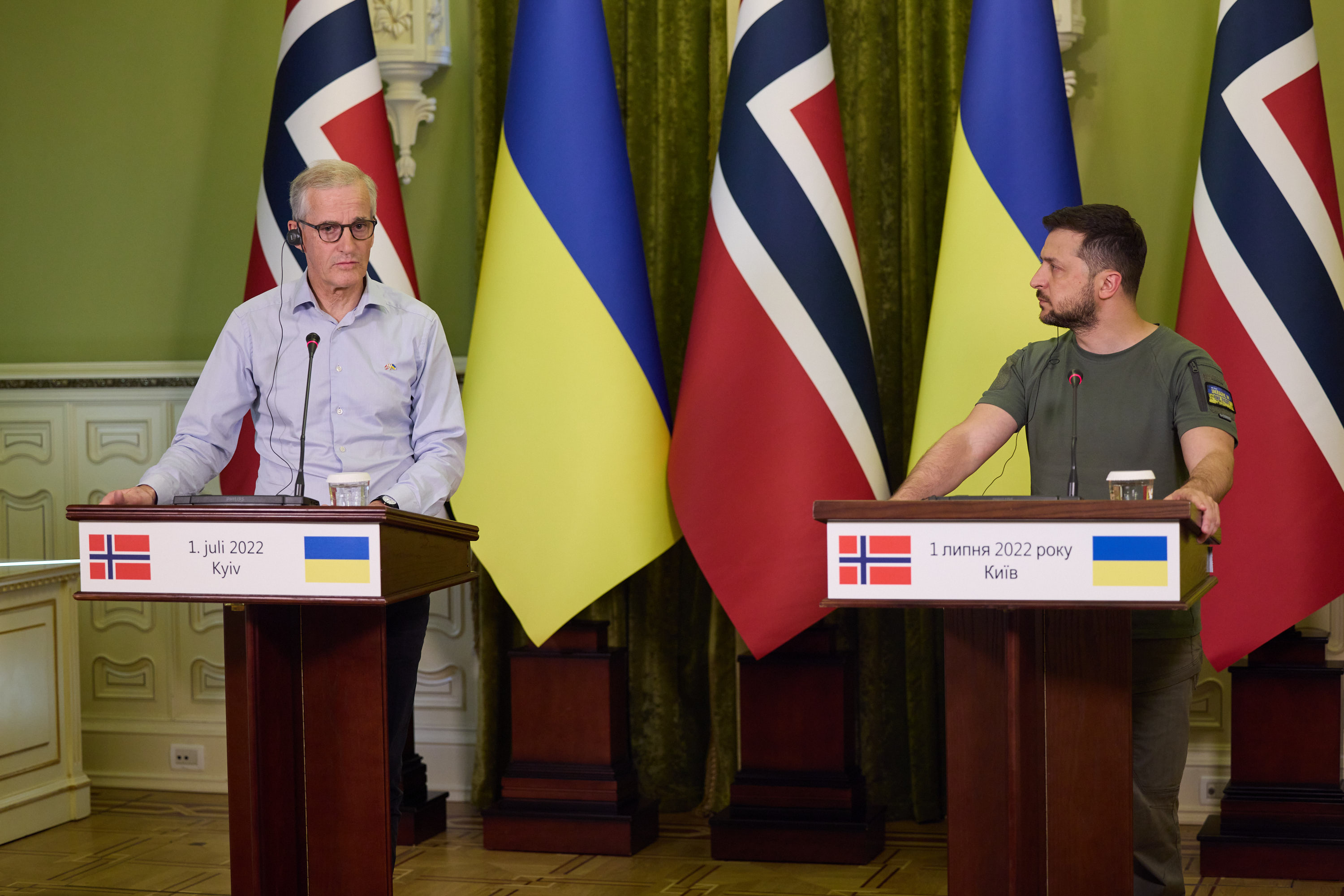
Norwegian Prime Minister Jonas Gahr Støre with Ukrainian President Volodymyr Zelenskyy in Kyiv, 1 July 2022

Following the 2022 Ukraine cyberattack, Jonas Gahr Støre warned "we need to be more alert" and emphasised that Norway also had to be more alert to hybrid attacks and to consider them a threat to society. He said: "I am concerned that we as individuals and companies and institutions must be aware that this is part of our preparedness." He went on to say that the issue of cyber security would be looked at by the new Defence Commission, to be headed by former justice minister Knut Storberget.

Following the deployment of Russian troops to Eastern Ukraine, Støre expressed concerns about the situation and also condemned the actions by Russia. He also criticised Russian President Vladimir Putin's speech where Russia recognised the Donetsk and Luhansk people's republics as independent countries, and Sergei Lavrov's further comments.

On 27 February, Støre and members of his cabinet announced that Norway would be freezing the Government Pension Fund of Norway's investment in Russia. A process to pull the Oil Fund out of the country over time was also initiated.

On 31 March, Støre had an hour-long phone call with Putin after taking the initiative to do so with Nordic and European allies and the United States. He described the conversation as "possible to reach out" to Putin, and urged him to end the invasion of Ukraine. He also urged him to open humanitarian corridors in Mariupol and that the war required a negotiated solution.

One of ambulances given by Norway during war.

Støre visited Kyiv on 1 July, where he met with Ukrainian President Volodymyr Zelenskyy, and announced that Norway would be contributing with 10 billion NOK in aid. The money would notably go to humanitarian aid, reconstruction and support to crucial infrastructure, such as schools and hospitals. Støre also visited the ruins of the city of Yahidne, which he described as "getting an insight into hell on earth".

On 30 September, Støre condemned the Russian annexation of Kherson Oblast, Zaporizhzhia Oblast, Donetsk Oblast and Luhansk Oblast. He also confirmed that Norway had accepted assistance from other allied countries to tighten security in the Norwegian sector. Regarding the annexations, he stated: "Putin has announced a few hours ago that Russia is incorporating four Ukrainian regions as part of Russia. The annexation of the four regions is without legitimacy. The so-called referendums were carried out under military occupation and are in violation of international law".

At a press conference on 20 October, accompanied by justice minister Emilie Enger Mehl and defence minister Bjørn Arild Gram, Støre warned that the war in Ukraine was reaching a new and dangerous phase. He also warned that the security situation in Europe had become more tense in the wake of the Nord Stream pipeline sabotage.

In early May 2023, he attended a summit in Helsinki, Finland, with Ukrainian President Volodymyr Zelenskyy and other Nordic leaders.

In February 2024, Støre announced that his government would provide 75 million NOK in support for Ukraine and stated that Norway would continue to support the country.

Støre was one of the participants at the European-led Ukraine peace summit in March 2025. Despite the American absence at the summit, he argued that the United States should take part in any peace negotiations and that they would be the guarantor for security as a foundation for a peace settlement in the war in Ukraine.

=== High level visits ===
==== High-level visits from Norway to Ukraine ====
Jonas Gahr Støre

- 1 July 2022
- 24 August 2023 he arrived in Kyiv for Ukraine’s Independence Day. During the visit, he took part in official events, including laying a wreath, meeting with President Volodymyr Zelensky, and visiting the town of Bucha and damaged infrastructure, including the power plant, where he pledged significant assistance, including IRIS-T air defense umbrellas, demining equipment, and energy support.
- 24 February 2025 he travelled to Kyiv to mark the third anniversary of the Russian invasion of Ukraine.
- 25 August 2025 he arrived in Ukraine on Monday. Ukrainian Foreign Minister Andrii Sybiha welcomed him at the railway station in Kyiv. Met with President Volodymyr Zelenskyy.

==== High-level visits from Ukraine to Norway ====
Volodymyr Zelenskyy

- 13 December 2023 he travelled to Oslo to meet with Prime Minister Jonas Gahr Støre, Finnish President Sauli Niinistö, Icelandic Prime Minister Katrín Jakobsdóttir, Danish Prime Minister Mette Frederiksen, and Swedish Prime Minister Ulf Kristersson at the second Nordic–Ukrainian summit. King Harald V received Zelenskyy in an audience at the Royal Palace, together with Queen Sonja, Crown Prince Haakon and Crown Princess Mette-Marit.
- 19–20 March 2025 he travelled to Oslo to meet with Prime Minister Jonas Gahr Støre.

== Political dialogue ==
Political dialogue with Norway is developing at all levels. Since the establishment of diplomatic relations between our states, the following mutual visits and meetings at a high political level have taken place: a visit to Ukraine by the Minister of Foreign Affairs of Norway, T. Stoltenberg (February 1992), a visit to Norway by the Minister of Foreign Affairs of Ukraine, H. Udovenko (March 1996), a visit to Ukraine by the Minister of Foreign Affairs of Norway, T. Jagland (November 2000), a visit to Norway by the Minister of Foreign Affairs of Ukraine, K. Gryshchenko (June 2004), a visit to Norway by the Deputy Prime Minister of Ukraine for European Integration, O. Rybachuk (31 May - 2 June 2005), an official visit to Ukraine by the Minister of Foreign Affairs of Norway, J. G. Støre (30 - 31 May 2006), and a number of bilateral contacts at a high level within the framework of international forums in 2009-2010.

At the parliamentary level, the first visits to Ukraine were made by a delegation of the Storting led by its President, Ms. K. K. Grøndahl (May 1999) and President T. Jagland in 2009, to Norway by a delegation of the Verkhovna Rada of Ukraine led by its Chairman V. Lytvyn (February 2003), and a group of deputies of the VRU during 2009-2010.

Political dialogue is also supported in the form of regular consultations between the Foreign Ministries of both states and interaction between our states in international organizations - the UN, UNESCO, the Council of Europe, the OSCE, the WTO, and others.

On many issues of Ukrainian-Norwegian bilateral relations, as well as on the international agenda, the Ukrainian and Norwegian sides demonstrate their mutual interest and closeness in approaches and assessments, in particular in the issues of further development of democratic and market reforms in Ukraine, the fullest use of the potential of both countries in mutually beneficial trade and economic cooperation, the fight against international terrorism and piracy, strengthening the role of the UN in ensuring international security, partnership and cooperation with the EU, etc.

Norway is supportive and has repeatedly confirmed its consistent support for Ukraine's course towards European integration.

== Resident diplomatic missions ==
- Norway has an embassy in Kyiv.
- Ukraine has an embassy and an honorary consulate in Oslo.
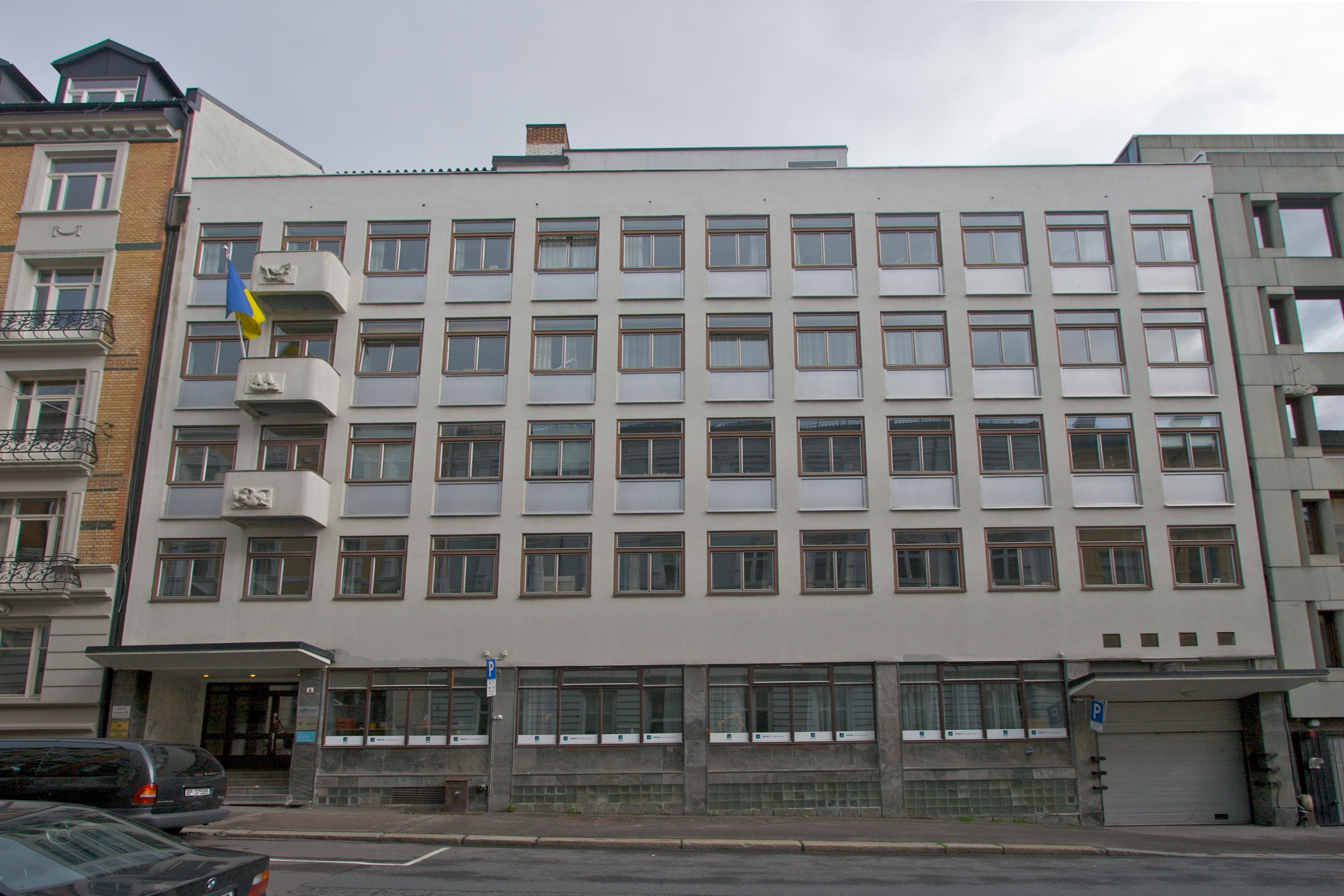
Embassy of Ukraine in Oslo

== See also ==
- Foreign relations of Norway
- Foreign relations of Ukraine
- Ukraine-NATO relations
