= Norway–Switzerland relations =

- Norway: Switzerland

Norway–Switzerland relations are foreign relations between Norway and Switzerland. Norway has an embassy in Bern and Switzerland has an embassy in Oslo. Both countries are members of the European Free Trade Association, Council of Europe and the Organization for Security and Co-operation in Europe. Neither country is a member of the European Union. Norway is a full member of NATO, while Switzerland is not.

== Work and education ==
In the 1800s, a number of Swiss workers migrated to Norway. Several were dairy experts who worked in the budding Norwegian dairy industry and passed on their expertise to others. They were known as sveitser ("Swiss"), later shortened to sveiser. Later, when the dairy industry became more industrialized, Swiss companies such as Nestlé invested in Norwegian factories. Nestlé's first acquisition outside of Switzerland was Kapp Melkefabrikk at Kapp in 1898, followed by Hamar Melkefabrikk in 1905 and other facilities.

Before the United States became the world-leading scientific power, Norwegians were more inclined to undertake higher education in the German-speaking world, especially engineers. While most of the Germanophone universities and technical colleges they attended were located in Germany, ETH Zurich saw a large influx of Norwegian students. ETH has also kept records of every Norwegian graduate of the university since 1855.

== Diplomatic relations ==
Switzerland opened a consulate in Oslo in 1847 (which was upgraded to a consulate general in 1921). Norway established a consulate general in Zurich in 1906. In 1918, the Norwegian ambassador in Rome was accredited to Bern and the Swiss representative in Stockholm was accredited to Oslo. The legations that were opened in Bern and Oslo after the Second World War were upgraded to the status of embassy in 1955 and 1957 respectively.

Bilateral relations between Switzerland and the Kingdom of Norway are described as "excellent". The volume of bilateral trade amounted to CHF 1.12 billion in 2019. Neither is a member of the European Union but both maintain close contact within the European Free Trade Association.

Before and after his tenure as Norway's Minister of Foreign Affairs, Børge Brende has been President of the World Economic Forum.

== Culture ==
Norway and Switzerland are both prominent winter sport nations, especially sharing an appreciation for Nordic skiing, alpine skiing, ice hockey and formerly speed skating in Davos. Norwegian organizations are members of several sporting bodies headquartered in Switzerland, including the IOC and FIFA. In cultural matters, the countries cooperate within the Geneva-based European Broadcasting Union among others.

== Resident diplomatic missions ==
- Norway has an embassy in Bern.
- Switzerland has an embassy in Oslo.

== See also ==
- Foreign relations of Norway
- Foreign relations of Switzerland
