= Norway–Romania relations =

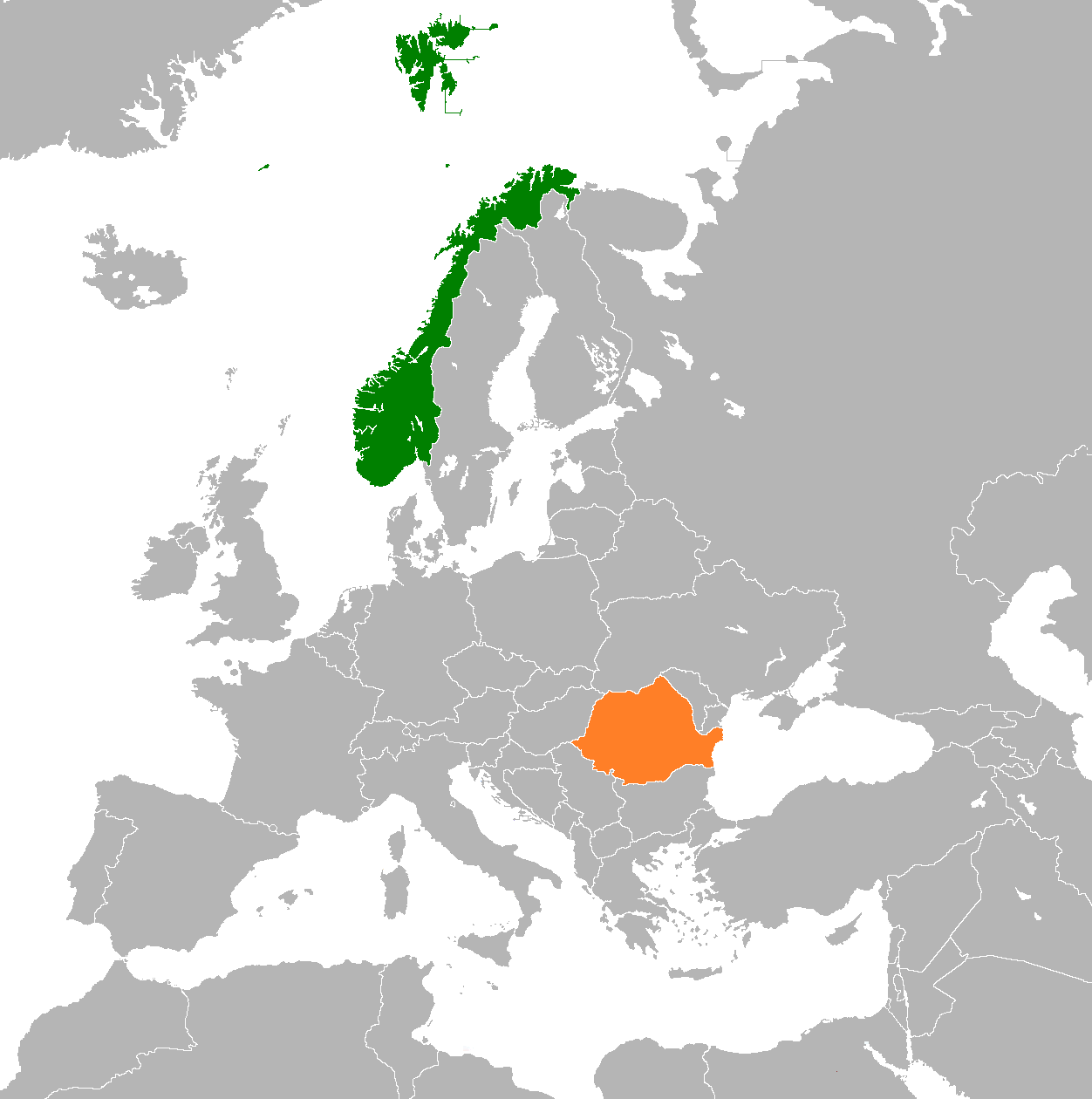
- Norway: Romania

Norway–Romania relations are foreign relations between Norway and Romania. Both countries established diplomatic relations on April 3, 1917. Norway has an embassy in Bucharest. Romania has an embassy in Oslo.

Both countries are full members of the North Atlantic Treaty Organization and of the Council of Europe.

== History ==
Viking expansion in the 8th-11th centuries. Green denotes areas subjected to frequent Viking raids

The earliest contact between the Romanian and Norwegian people may have been in the 9th century AD when Varangians began trading with the Byzantine Empire along routes that led through Romania. There are a number of Varangian relics in modern-day Romania.

However, formal relations between the modern states began only in 1917, towards the end of the First World War. Relations were interrupted during the Second World War (1939–1945), but formally resumed in 1946. Relations greatly improved after the Romanian Revolution of 1989. Norway was one of the first countries to recognize the new regime in Romania after the revolution, and the Norwegian embassy in Bucharest was reopened in the summer of 1990.

== Agreements ==
In 1993, representatives of Norway and Romania meeting in Oslo agreed to modifications to their 1991 General Agreement on Tariffs and Trade (GATT) agreement on trade in textiles. In 2002, the two countries signed an agreement on reducing greenhouse gas emissions consistent with the Kyoto Protocol. In September 2004, Romania and Norway signed an agreement on energy and the environment. In August 2007 Norway made an agreement with the EU concerning a Cooperation Programme for Economic Growth and Sustainable Development in Romania. The cost to Norway was almost 100 million euros. In November 2007 Romanian President Traian Băsescu (a former naval captain who studied at the Shipping Academy in Norway) signed an agreement in Oslo on research and educational cooperation between 3 leading maritime universities in Romania and NCE Maritime.

== High level visits ==
In September 1999, King Harald V and Queen Sonja of Norway made a state visit to Romania where they met with president Emil Constantinescu and his wife. During the visit, Norway's Foreign Minister Knut Vollebaek expressed Norwegian support for Romania's bid to join NATO. In September 2002, Romanian Prime Minister Adrian Năstase made a formal visit to Oslo where he met Norwegian Prime Minister Kjell Magne Bondevik. Among other subject, Nastase asked for Norway's continued support for Romania's NATO bid.

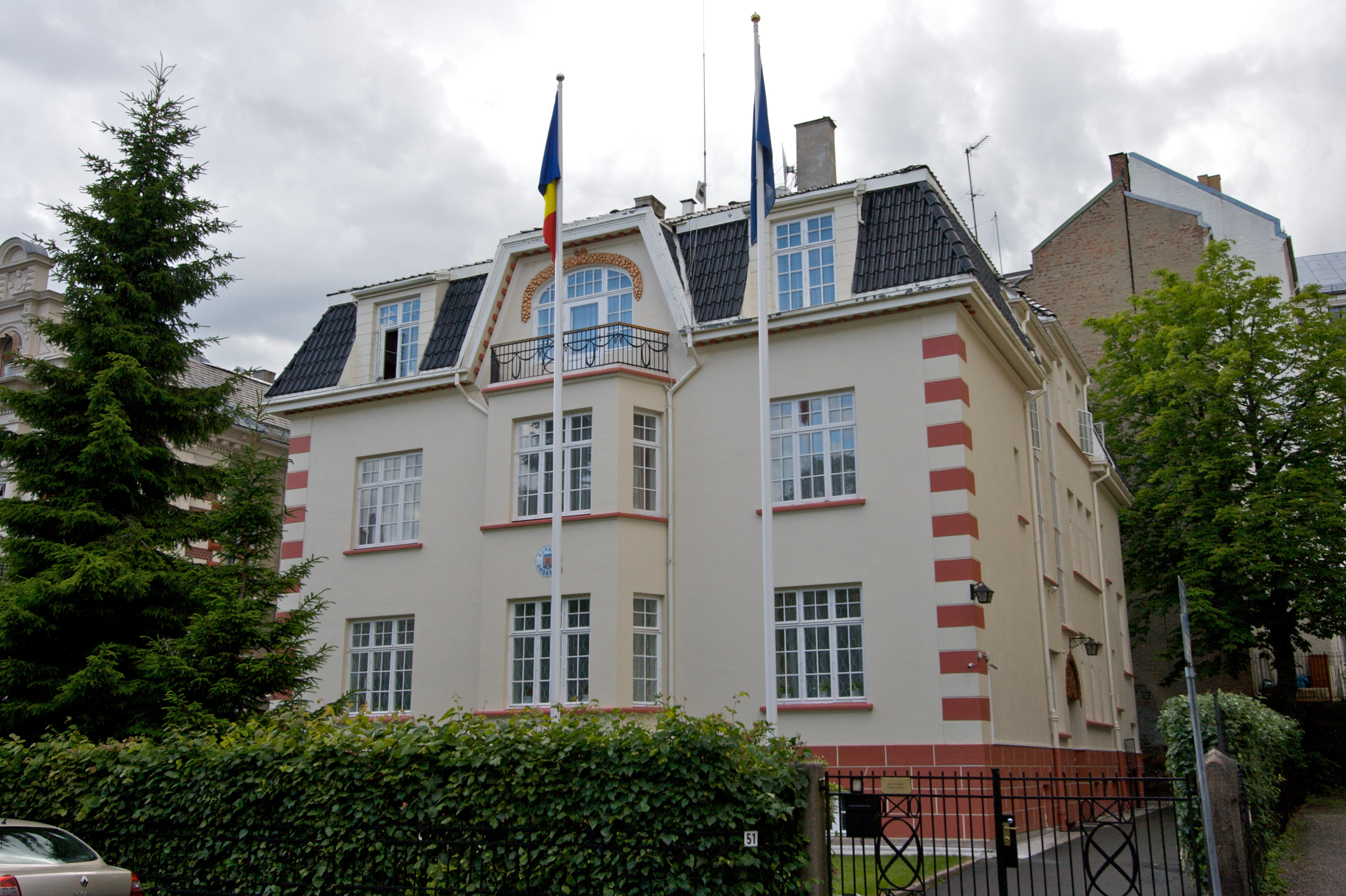
Romanian Embassy, Oslo, Norway

In July 2003 Norwegian Defence Minister Kristin Krohn Devold visited Bucharest where she met President Ion Iliescu. They discussed improvements in Romanian-Norwegian defence cooperation, as well as greater bilateral cooperation in other fields. In February 2004, Norway's Foreign Minister Jan Petersen met Romanian Premier Adrian Năstase in Bucharest. They discussed the excellent relations between the countries and further development of the partnership. Romania joined NATO in March 2004. In May 2004, Romanian National Defence Minister Ioan Mircea Pascu said he expected "special" military ties with Norway to improve as a result.

In September 2004, Norwegian Prime Minister Kjell Magne Bondevik visited Romania where he met with President Ion Iliescu and other officials. They discussed strengthened cooperation in strategic fields as NATO partners, as well as improved economic cooperation once Romania joined the European Union. In November 2007, Romanian President Traian Băsescu visited Norway where he met with King Harald V. The two men praised the 90 years of diplomatic relations between the two countries, and solid cooperation in foreign affairs. Also in November 2007, leaders of the two country's police services agreed to further improve bilateral cooperation aiming at preventing and combatting serious crime.

== Economic relations ==
In 2003, imports from Romania to Norway were about $157 million, mostly ship hulls. Norwegian exports to Romania were about $34 million and included machinery, fish, seafood and electrical machinery. Speaking in May 2005, Norwegian ambassador to Romania Leif Arne Ulland noted that bilateral trade had grown strongly in the last ten years, reaching 141 million Euro in 2004. Norwegian investment in Romania could be around 100 million Euro.

Norwegian companies operating in Romania in 2005 included Aker, employing 6,500 people, IMGB Kvaerner and Orkla Foods. Aker is now STX Europe, owned by the South Korean industrial chaebol STX Corporation. It is the largest shipbuilding group in Europe and the fourth largest in the world. With headquarters in Oslo, Norway, STX Europe operates 15 shipyards in Brazil, Finland, France, Norway, Romania and Vietnam. IMGB Kvaerner is now owned by the Korean giant Doosan Heavy Industries & Construction. The Norwegian firm Jacobsen Electro is a partner with Romelectro in developing the Romanian electricity transmission and distribution network.

By 2006, trade volumes had reached 307 million Euro. Investments by Norwegian businesspeople had grown to 120 million Euro. In February 2007, the European Union put pressure on Norway, a non-EU country, to increase the payments it makes in return for access to the European market to account for the accession of Bulgaria and Romania.

== Heavy water incident ==
In May 1988, reports were published that said Romania had sold heavy water to Israel that had been purchased from Norway. Heavy water is a key ingredient in making plutonium for nuclear bombs. Romania denied the allegations. Norway had asked Israel in 1987 for confirmation that the heavy water is not being used to make bombs, but as of July 1989 Israel had not agreed to inspections.

== Resident diplomatic missions ==
- Norway has an embassy in Bucharest.
- Romania has an embassy in Oslo.

== See also ==
- Foreign relations of Norway
- Foreign relations of Romania
- Norway-EU relations
- NATO-EU relations
- Arnt Rindal, Norway's ambassador to Romania (from 1999 to 2003)
