= Tonnage tax =

Taxation mechanism for shipping companies

A tonnage tax is a taxation mechanism that can be applied to shipping companies instead of ordinary corporate taxation. The tax is determined by the net tonnage of the entire fleet of vessels under operation or use by a company. It is on the basis of this variable that taxation is applied. The effective tonnage tax paid is typically considerably lower than a corresponding ordinary corporate tax liability, making the tonnage tax one of the main maritime subsidies by governments in recent decades.

Given that the tax perceived is independent from the volume of material transported and from the operating profit of a shipping company, it is less complex to manage for tax authorities and shipping companies. This method of taxation is based on an internationally recognized variable - net tonnage - by independent certifying bodies that determine the transport capacity of the vessels.

It is estimated that during the period 2005–2019, the global shipping industry as a whole paid taxes corresponding to an effective corporate income tax rate of 7%, compared to the OECD average corporate tax rate of 23.7%. One of the main reasons for the favorable tax treatment was the tonnage tax arrangements of several countries.

The first country to introduce a tonnage tax was Greece back in 1957. By 2019, tonnage tax rules were applied in many countries, including Japan, South Korea and 22 EU countries. In 2023, the tonnage tax applies to 23 European countries and 86% of the world fleet. All the leaders in the maritime container shipping sector are affected: MSC, Maersk, Hapag-Lloyd, CMA-CGM, Cosco (China) and One (Japan).

== See also ==
- Tonnage tax in Poland
