= Embassy of Norway, Dublin =

- Location: Dublin
- Address: Ferry House, 48-53 Mount Street Lower, Dublin
- Coordinates: 53°20′27.67″N 6°15′24.7″W
- Ambassador: Mari Skåre
- Website: norway.no/en/ireland

The Embassy of Norway in Dublin, officially the Royal Norwegian Embassy, was established in 1983.

The mission of the Embassy is to promote Norwegian interests in Ireland and to improve further the Norwegian-Irish relations. The Embassy works in close co-operation with Irish and Norwegian public and private institutions, as well as with organisations and individuals.

As of 8 October 2020, the current ambassador to Ireland is Mari Skåre who had previously served as Chef de Cabinet to the UN President of the 74th Session of the United Nations General Assembly

The Embassy does not handle visa applications.
