= Tonnage tax in Poland =

Polish tax on income from international maritime shipping

Tonnage tax in Poland is a tax levied on specific income or revenue earned by shipowners operating merchant ships in international shipping. It was established by the Act on Tonnage Tax of 24 August 2006. Unlike traditional income taxes, this nominally income-based tax is calculated on a flat-rate basis depending on the tonnage of the vessel, rather than the ship-owner's actual profits or losses. The taxable base is the income, reduced by social insurance contributions, with a tax rate of 19%.

== Taxable entities ==
According to Article 3 of the Tonnage Tax Act, the tax applies to ship-owners engaged in international shipping using vessels with a gross tonnage exceeding 100 GT each, for activities including:

- Transport of cargo or passengers
- Deep-sea towing, provided at least 50% of the annual revenue from the tug's operations comes from towing services other than to, from, or within a port
- Deep-sea salvage operations
- Dredging, provided at least 50% of the annual revenue from the dredger's operations comes from transporting dredged materials at sea

== Taxable activities ==
The subject of taxation includes the following activities conducted by shipowners:

- Leasing and use of containers
- Loading, unloading, and repair operations
- Operating passenger terminals
- Selling goods or services on board passenger or passenger-cargo vessels for onboard consumption
- Operating currency exchange services on board passenger or passenger-cargo vessels
- Land and sea transport of cargo or passengers
- Multimodal transport of cargo or passengers
- Ship management
- Providing maritime agency, brokerage, and crew recruitment services
- Renting, leasing, or chartering vessels

The following activities are exempt from tonnage tax:

- Exploration, geological surveys, or extraction of seabed mineral resources
- Fishing or fish processing
- Construction of seaports, port infrastructure, or port facilities
- Construction of offshore wind farms
- Construction of underwater pipelines
- Construction of waterways or dredging of waterways and reservoirs
- Underwater operations
- Pilotage services within port boundaries
- Passenger shipping within ports and marinas
- Education, scientific research, sports, or recreational transport
- Operation of permanently anchored or moored vessels lacking navigational capability

== Tax base ==
The tax base for tonnage tax is the ship-owner's income from taxable activities and services in international shipping. This base is reduced by the amount of social insurance contributions, as specified in the Act on the Social Insurance System of 13 October 1998, paid in the tax year by a ship-owner who is a natural person or a partner in a partnership, for their own pension, disability, sickness, and accident insurance, as well as for collaborating individuals. This reduction aligns with procedures for corporate income tax deductions.

== Tax rates ==
Unlike corporate tax, tonnage tax is independent of the taxpayer's actual income. The daily flat-rate income is determined based on the vessel's net tonnage (NT) per 100 NT, using the rates in euros outlined below:

No.	Net tonnage of the vessel	Rate for calculating income
1.	Up to 1,000 NT	€0.50 per 100 NT
2.	1,001 to 10,000 NT	€0.35 per 100 NT above 1,000 NT
3.	10,001 to 25,000 NT	€0.20 per 100 NT above 10,000 NT
4.	Above 25,000 NT	€0.10 per 100 NT above 25,000 NT

The tax amount in PLN is calculated using the average exchange rate published by the National Bank of Poland on the last day of the month for which the tax is settled. The tonnage tax rate is 19% of the tax base.

== Exemptions, reliefs, and exclusions ==
The Tonnage Tax Act provides no exemptions, reliefs, or exclusions. As an alternative to corporate and personal income taxes, any applicable exemptions, reliefs, or exclusions are governed by income tax regulations.

== Tax settlement ==
=== Payments ===
Ship-owners must make monthly advance payments to the tax office, overseen by the head of the tax office responsible for tonnage tax matters, by the 20th day of each month for the previous month. For December, the payment is due by the deadline for filing the tax return.

=== Declaration and records ===
The tonnage tax declaration must be submitted by 31 January of the following year to the relevant tax office. Taxpayers must maintain records of fixed assets and intangible assets.

== Budget revenue impact ==
In 2010, tonnage tax contributed 3,000 PLN to the state budget, approximately 0.000001% of total budget revenue. In 2011, this increased to 10,000 PLN, or about 0.000003% of total revenue, making it the smallest contributor to the budget. In 2014, the budget act projected 7,000 PLN in tonnage tax revenue, but only 1,000 PLN was collected.
