= Japan–Norway relations =

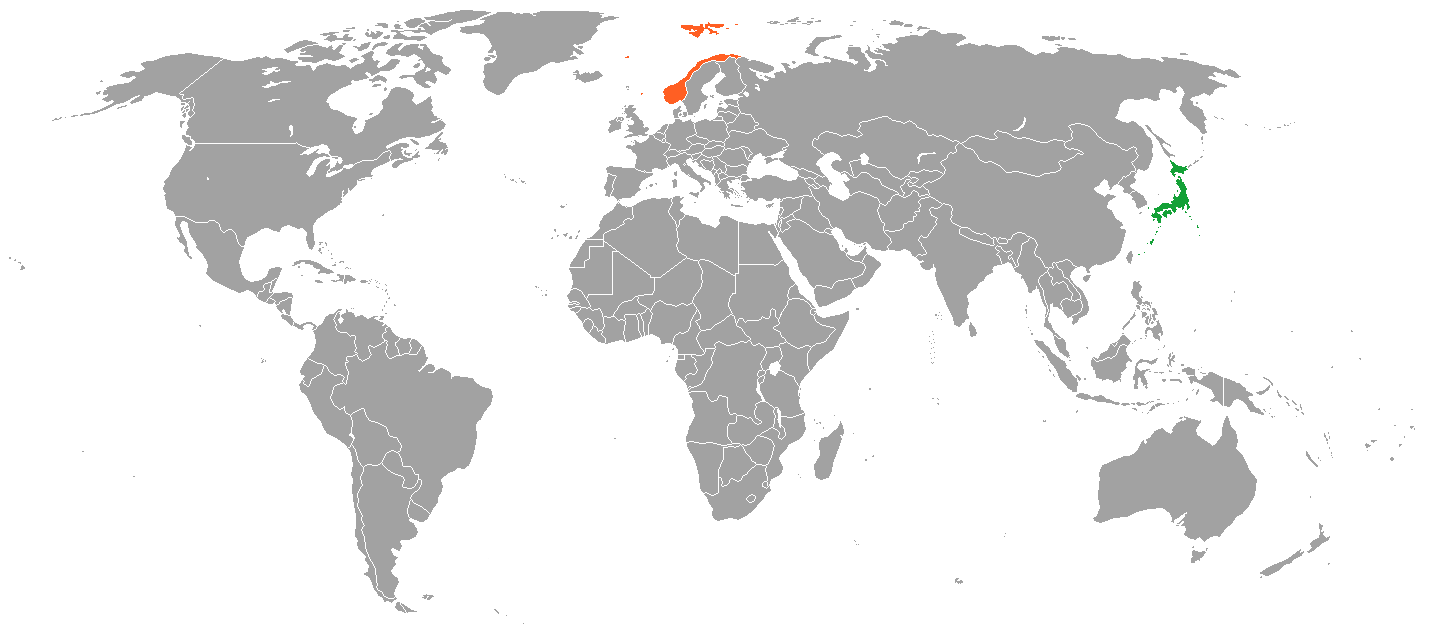
- Japan: Norway

Japan–Norway relations refers to the diplomatic relations between Japan and the Kingdom of Norway. Both nations are members of the Organisation for Economic Co-operation and Development.

== History ==
On November 1905, Japan and Norway established diplomatic relations.

== High-level visits ==
Emperor Akihito visited the king of Norway in 2005.

Prime Ministerial visits from Japan to Norway

Prime Ministerial visits from Norway to Japan

- Kjell Magne Bondevik (2003)
- Jens Stoltenberg (2012)
- Erna Solberg (2018)
- Jonas Gahr Støre (2023)

== Resident diplomatic missions ==
- Japan has an embassy in Oslo.
- Norway has an embassy in Tokyo.

== See also ==
- Foreign relations of Japan
- Foreign relations of Norway
