= Iceland–Norway relations =

- Iceland: Norway

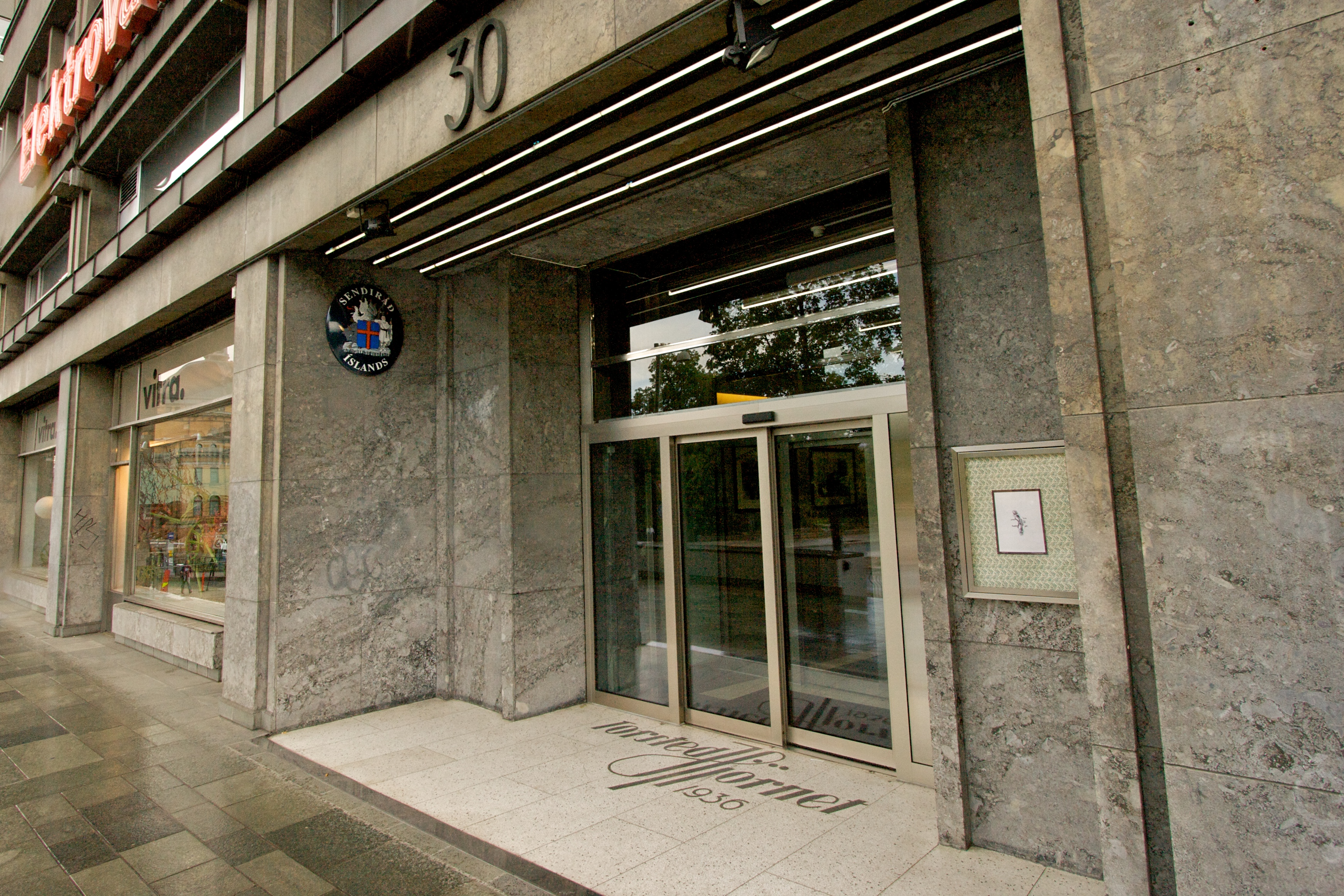
Embassy of Iceland in Oslo

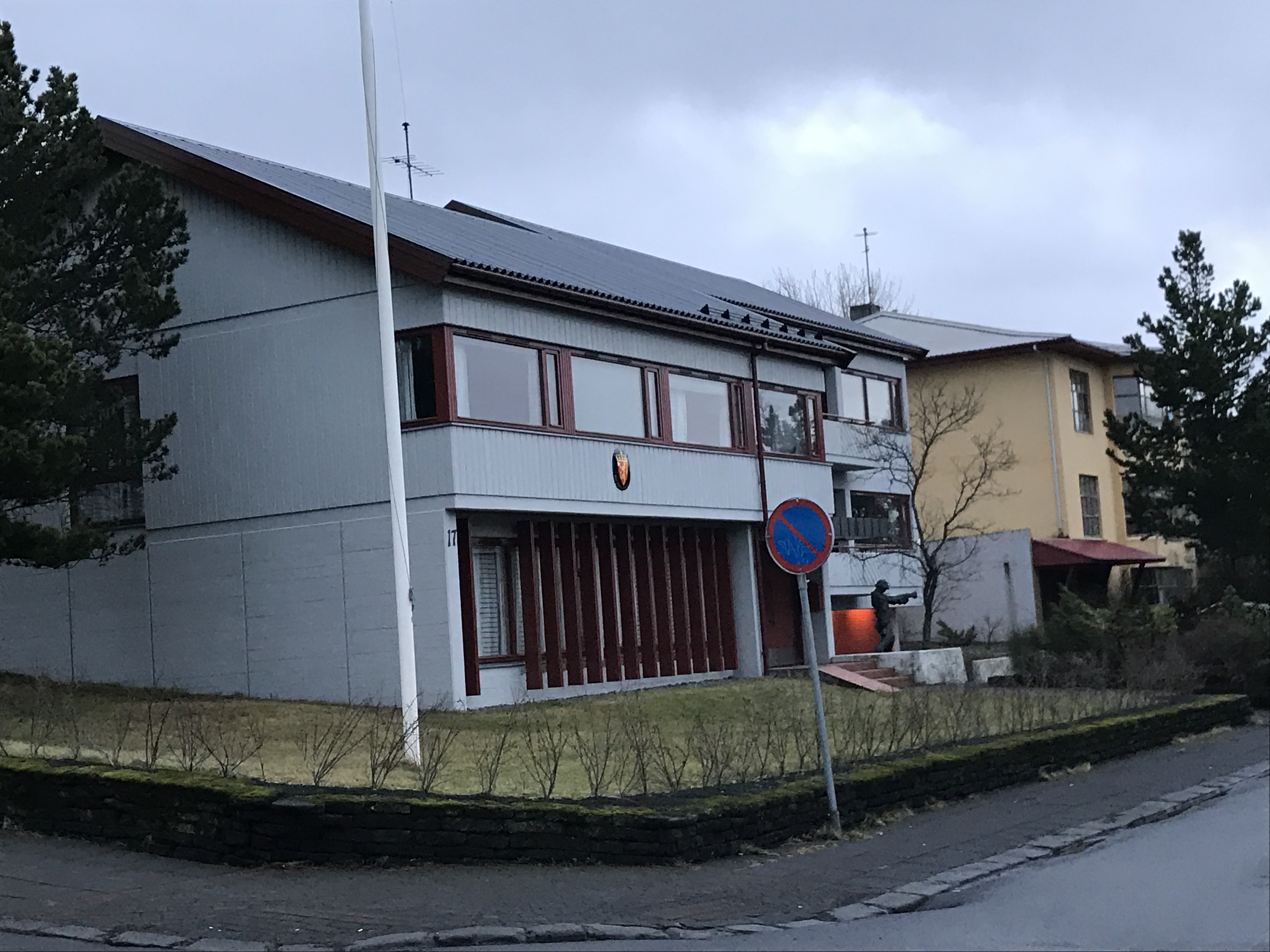
Embassy of Norway in Reykjavík

Iceland–Norway relations (Icelandic: Íslensk-norsk samskipti, Norwegian: Islandsk-norske forhold) are foreign relations between Iceland and Norway. Iceland has an embassy in Oslo and Norway has an embassy in Reykjavík.

Both countries are full members of Council of Europe, Nordic Council, NATO, Joint Expeditionary Force, Council of the Baltic Sea States, and the European Free Trade Association.

== Early history ==
Iceland was settled in medieval times, mainly by Norwegians accompanied by Celtic slaves. Ingólfr Arnarson the first settler arrived in 874 with most settlers coming between 880 and 910~. Iceland and Norway formed a common Norse cultural area in the North Sea, and much of Norway's history was chronicled by Icelandic writer Snorri Sturluson. Iceland was brought under Norwegian rule around 1262. This lasted until the formation of the Kalmar Union in 1380, which united the three kingdoms of Denmark, Norway (with Iceland, Greenland, Faroe Islands, Shetland and Orkney), and Sweden (including some of Finland) under a single monarch. The Kalmar union broke apart when the Lutheran Reformation became predominant, a union of the three Swedish crowns split apart from the Danish crown that continued to rule Norway, and Iceland, having hegemony over the North Sea. Norway gained independence from the so-called union, to some degree in 1814, whereas Iceland remained a colony until 1944. Greenland is still a Danish possession.

== Economy and production ==
=== Whaling ===
The two countries share a common history with regard to whaling and have often joined forces with Japan to resist international calls to reduce commercial whaling. Both countries have resisted signing the Convention on International Trade in Endangered Species that bans the trade in whale meat. The High North Alliance, which represents whalers, sealers and fishermen around the Arctic said "It's a legal import and a legal export, and in future might give access to a market that's really big for both Norwegian and Icelandic whalers".

In 1992, Iceland and Norway jointly announced they would recommence commercial whaling on certain species after a 6-year moratorium.

In 2002, Norway announced that it would allow a whaling company to export 10 to 15 tonnes of minke whale products to Iceland. This was condemned by the British Government as it was claimed the whale stocks they come from are on an international endangered species list. In 2006, the Icelandic fisheries ministry announced that it would authorise commercial whaling again, making it only the second country after Norway to hunt whales for commercial reasons.

=== Economic assistance ===
In connection with the 2008–2012 Icelandic financial crisis, the Norwegian government provided Iceland with a €500 million 5-year loan to stabilise the Icelandic króna in November 2008. The Norwegian Foreign Minister Jonas Gahr Støre said after meeting Icelandic Prime Minister Geir Haarde that "We want to show our support for the international initiative and we will be providing support to Iceland in the near future."

== Foreign policy and defence ==
On April 24th, 2007, the two countries signed a defence agreement, covering surveillance and military defense of Icelandic air space and economic zone. It means that Norwegian jet fighters and surveillance aircraft will be patrolling Icelandic air space. It is underlined that the agreement with Norway only covers peace time. In case of a military conflict it is still NATO and the United States Government that will carry the main responsibility for Iceland's defence. The agreement was signed following the decision to withdraw the US military from the Keflavík naval air base in 2006.

== Resident diplomatic missions ==
- Iceland has an embassy in Oslo.
- Norway has an embassy in Reykjavík.

== See also ==
- Foreign relations of Iceland
- Foreign relations of Norway
- Icelandics in Norway
- Norwegians in Iceland
