= Croatia–Norway relations =

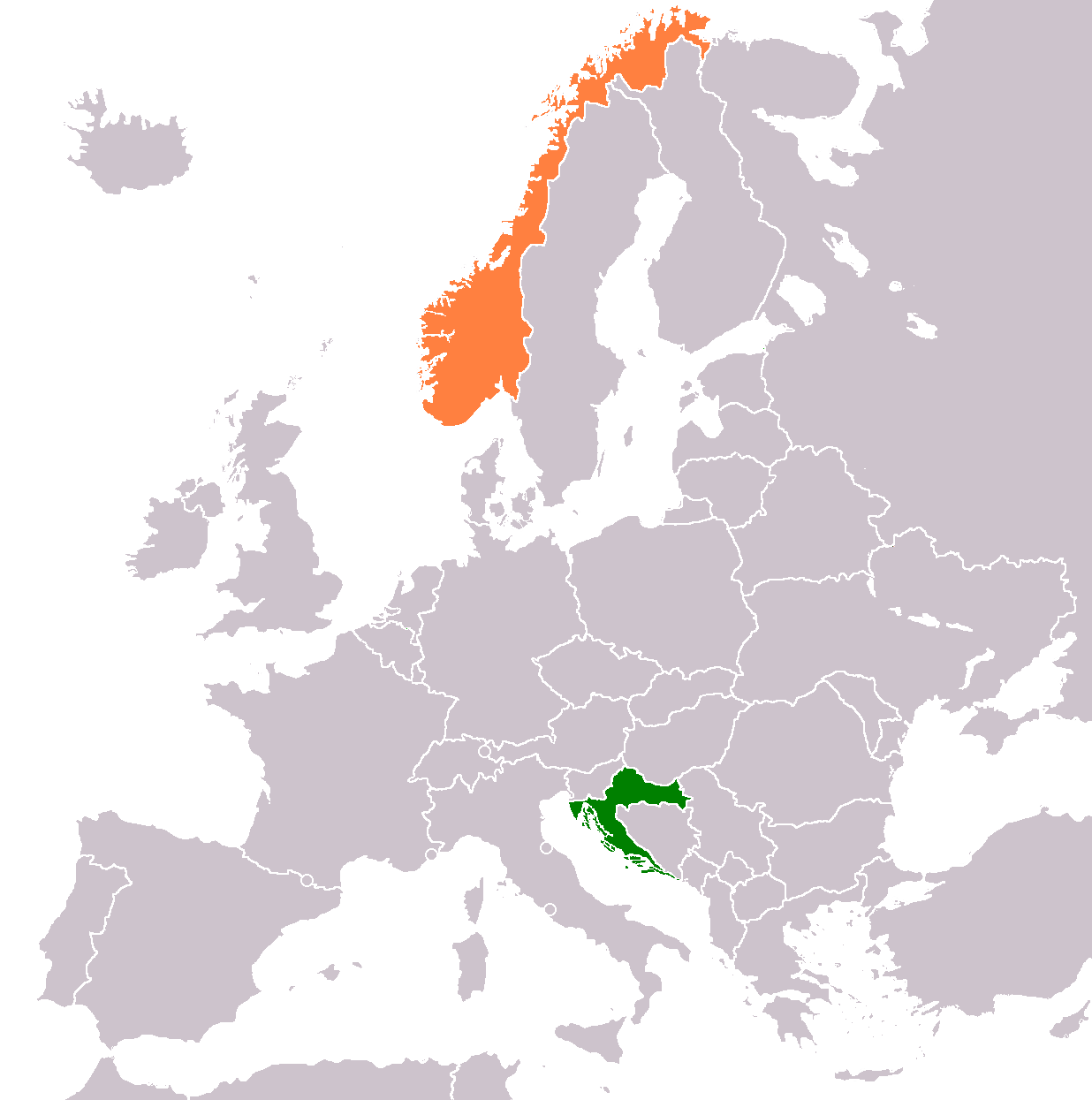

- Croatia: Norway

Croatia–Norway relations are the bilateral relations between Croatia and Norway. The two countries established diplomatic relations on 20 February 1992. Croatia has an embassy in Oslo. Norway has an embassy in Zagreb and an honorary consulate in Rijeka.

Both countries are full members of the Council of Europe and NATO.

== History ==
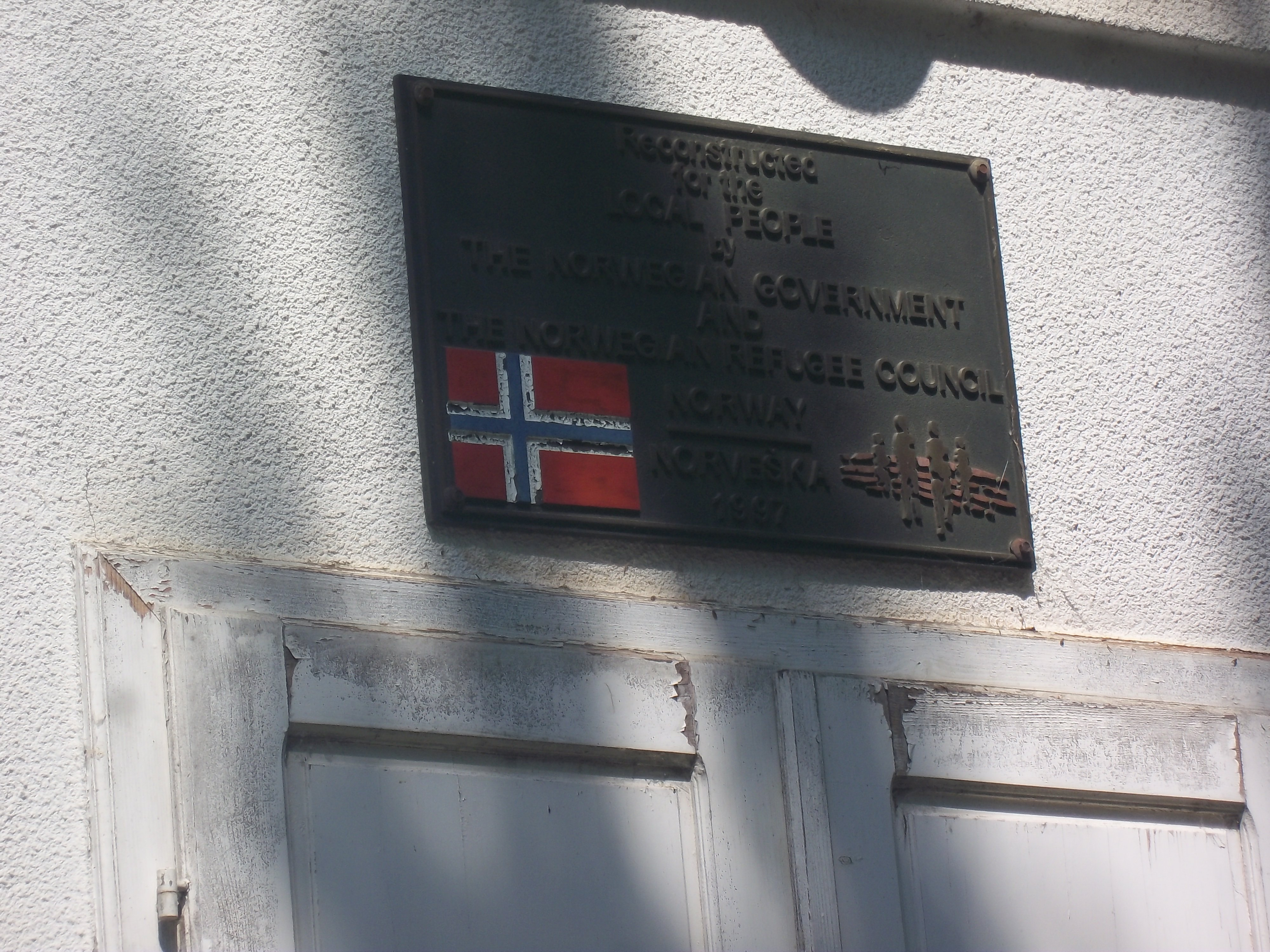
Commemorative plate marking donation by the Government of Norway and the Norwegian Refugee Council in 1997 in Čakovci

Norway was active in international peace efforts during the period of the Croatian War of Independence and in its immediate aftermath, particularly in the multicultural eastern Croatian Podunavlje region. Thorvald Stoltenberg was appointed UN special representative to Croatia in May 1993. Stoltenberg was the United Nations witness at the signing of the Erdut Agreement in 1995 which led to the establishment of the UNTAES administration. In 1998 Norwegian representative Halvor Hartz was the Police Commissioner of the United Nations Civilian Police Support Group in eastern Croatia. In 1999 Olav Akselsen was the Council of Europe Rapporteur on return of refugees and displaced persons to their homes in Croatia. In 2013, related to promotion of inter-ethnic harmony in eastern Slavonia, Norwegian permanent mission to United Nations in Geneva expressed some concerned about the implementation of minority rights, particularly in the case of Serbs and Roma. In 2014 the two countries signed an international agreement on financial assistance (with the minor contribution of Liechtenstein and Iceland) for the establishment of the so-called Integrated School in Vukovar. The project, however, ultimately failed due to a lack of interest in enrolling students in the new school by the two largest communities in the town.

== Transportation ==
Croatia Airlines operates seasonal flights from Zagreb to Oslo (Gardermoen).

Norwegian operates seasonal flights from Oslo (Gardermoen) to Dubrovnik, Pula, Split and Zadar.

Scandinavian Airlines operates seasonal flights from Oslo (Gardermoen) to Dubrovnik and Pula.

== Resident diplomatic missions ==
- Croatia has an embassy in Oslo.
- Norway has an embassy in Zagreb and an honorary consulate in Rijeka.

== See also ==
- Foreign relations of Croatia
- Foreign relations of Norway
- Norway–Yugoslavia relations
