= Service Rigs =

A service rig is a mobile platform loaded with oil industry service equipment that can be driven long distances within the oil fields to service wells. Unlike drilling rigs, service rigs return to a particular well many times.

There are several specialized types of service rigs: the carrier, the pumptruck, the doghouse, a 5-ton equipment truck and several crew vehicles. The rigs usually travel in a convoy, because all of the component rigs are needed for proper oil well servicing. The crew use the equipment on the rigs to provide a variety of services, including completions, work-overs, abandonment's, well maintenance, high-pressure and critical sour-well work and re-entry preparation.

Offshore oil rigs are serviced by floating versions of the same equipment.

== Vehicles/Equipment ==
The Rig, or Carrier, is a mobile truck with a derrick and a cab for one driver. The carrier can also be trailer-mounted, enabling it to be towed behind a prime mover. Traditionally, trailer-mounted service rigs are much larger and heavier, with greater capacities. Once secured on location, the derrick is elevated to standing position with the use of hydraulics. After that, the rest of the rig can be assembled and the service process initiated.

The Pumptruck has a large tank on the rear, and is used to pump fluid and store fluid from the well during different stages of the maintenance process. It is assembled using a series of pipes and operated with valves and pressure systems.

The Doghouse is a portable building used by the crew members to suit up, eat lunch, and assemble during meetings and breaks. It holds the communications and emergency equipment, a washroom, and has a storage space for inventory and tools. This space is referred to as the Light Plant, and in some occasion's a tool room, the Light Plant contains a diesel generator to provide electricity for lights and equipment.

The 5 Ton is a large truck which carries tools and other equipment, including the B.O.P.'s(blow-out preventer), tongs, a rod table, and extra pipe. It also pulls the doghouse from one location to the next.

== Crew Members ==
The crew members on service rigs each have specialized experience and expertise. The entry-level workers are junior floor hands called roughnecks; they do most of the heavy work on the rig floor, as well as hauling pipe, maintaining equipment and cleaning up. Derrickhands are more experienced workers who assemble the pump truck, monitor circulations and handle pipe and rods on the elevated tubing board. The most experienced member of a service rig crew is the driller, who runs the control panel next to the rig floor, controls the height of the derrick, monitors the roughnecks and derrickhands, and sees that the job is done efficiently but safely.

Each service rig has a manager called a Toolpush, who orders and monitors supplies, monitors and records the progress of each job and schedules the crew's time. At times there is also a representative present from the oil company whose wells are being serviced.

Service rig crew's are often under the supervision of a Consultant who is contracted through said oil company and reviews safety and job tasks with the crew, and organizes the process of moving from each well and ensuring the completion of the job.

Jobs on service rigs are often more stable than those on drilling rigs, because maintenance is an ongoing process.
