= Nordic diaspora =

The Nordic diaspora may refer to:

== Old diaspora ==
=== Viking and Old Norse ===
"Scandinavian diaspora" during this era refers to explorations, conquests, emigrations, and pioneering settlements during the Viking expansion. Scrutinising the Viking Age through the lens of settlement offers a distinct perspective, highlighting their cultural profile distinct from their predatory reputation.

== Modern diaspora ==
The term "Nordic diaspora" is also used to describe more recent emigrations and emigrants originating in one or more of the Nordic countries.

=== Swedish diaspora ===
Swedish diaspora communities include:

- Swedish Americans
- Swedish Argentines
- Swedish Australians
- Swedish Canadians
- Swedish Costa Ricans
- Ural Swedes (Russia)
- Gammalsvenskby (Ukraine)

=== Finnish diaspora ===
People emigrated to the United States, Canada, Ghana, Australia, New Zealand, South Africa, Senegal, Sierra Leone, Italy, Ireland, United Kingdom, Sweden, Brazil and Argentina. They have also started Utopian communities in places including Australia, Brazil, Paraguay, France, Cuba, and Sierra Leone.

Finnish diaspora communities include:

- Finnish Americans
- Finnish Argentine
- Finnish Australians
- Finnish Canadians
- Forest Finns (Norway & Sweden)
- Kven people (Norway)
- Ingrian Finns (Russia)
- Sweden Finns
- Tornedalians (Sweden)
- Finns in Switzerland

=== Danish diaspora ===
Danish diaspora communities include:

- Danish Americans
  - Greenlandic Americans
  - Faroese Americans
- Danish Argentine
- Danish Australians
- Danish Canadians
- Danish minority of Southern Schleswig (Germany)
- Danish people in Greenland
- Danish New Zealanders
- Danes in Sweden

=== Icelandic diaspora ===
Icelandic diaspora communities include:

- Icelandic Americans
- Icelandic Australians
- Icelandic Canadians
- Icelanders in Sweden

=== Norwegian diaspora ===
Norwegian diaspora communities include:

- Norwegian Americans
- Norwegian Australians
- Norwegian Canadians
- Norwegians in Finland
- Norwegian New Zealanders
- Kola Norwegians (Russia)
- Norwegian South Africans
- Norwegian diaspora in Denmark
- Norwegian diaspora in Sweden

The first modern Norwegian settlement in the United States was Norwegian Ridge, in what is now Spring Grove, Minnesota.

== See also ==
- Nordic and Scandinavian Americans
- Nordic Australians
- Scandinavian migration to Britain
- Nordic Brazilians
- Nordic and Scandinavian Canadians
- Early Scandinavian Dublin
- Scandinavian Mexicans
- Nordic New Zealanders
- Nordic Venezuelans
