= Norwegian Brazilians =

Norwegian Immigrants to Brazil

Norueguês-brasileiros Norsk-brasilianere
- (Norway) (Brazil)

Total population
- Unknown

Regions with significant populations
- Natal, South Region and Southeast Region

Languages
- Brazilian Portuguese; Norwegian

Religion
- Protestantism (especially Lutheranism) and Roman Catholicism

Related ethnic groups
- Norwegians, Norwegian Americans, Norwegian Canadians, Norwegian Australians, Norwegian New Zealanders

Norwegian Brazilians are Brazilian citizens who identify themselves as being of full or partial Norwegian ancestry or people who emigrated from Norway and reside in Brazil.

Norwegian immigration to Brazil started at the end of the 19th century, as well as several other waves of European immigration. The community of Norwegians and their descendants in Brazil is estimated to be the 3rd largest in the world, being surpassed only by the Norwegian communities in the United States and Canada.

Influences of the Norwegian community in Brazil can be found in Curitiba, home to the Alfredo Andersen Museum, as well as in the Colonia Dona Francisca that originated the largest city in the state of Santa Catarina, Joinville, home to the Centreventos Cau Hansen.

In recent years, a few Norwegians and even Swedes have migrated to the littoral zone of the state of Rio Grande do Norte (mainly in Natal) and Ceará, attracted by the beaches and the tropical climate.

== See also ==
- Scandinavian Brazilians

Lucas Pinheiro Braathen (Norwegian father)

Jonathan Haagensen (Norwegian father)
