= Finland–Norway relations =

- Finland: Norway

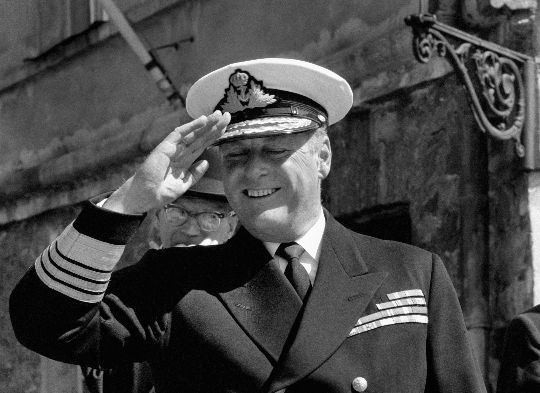
King of Norway Olav V during his visit to Finland in Suomenlinna. Behind him, President Urho Kekkonen in 1961

Finland–Norway relations are the foreign relations between Finland and Norway. The states share the Finland–Norway border.

Both countries established diplomatic relations in 1917, after Finland's independence. Finland has an embassy in Oslo. Norway has an embassy in Helsinki.

For some decades surrounding 1900, many in Norway feared the Finnish immigration and Kven people in Northern Norway, coining the term "the Finnish danger". For a period, interests in Norway wanted to annex parts of Lapland (most notably the "arm" protruding from the north-west and into Storfjord Municipality) as buffer zones. The controversy around Finns in Norway subsided over time, and the land claim never evolved into open conflict.

Both countries are full members of the Nordic Council, Council of the Baltic Sea States, Joint Expeditionary Force, NATO and of the Council of Europe.

== Diaspora ==
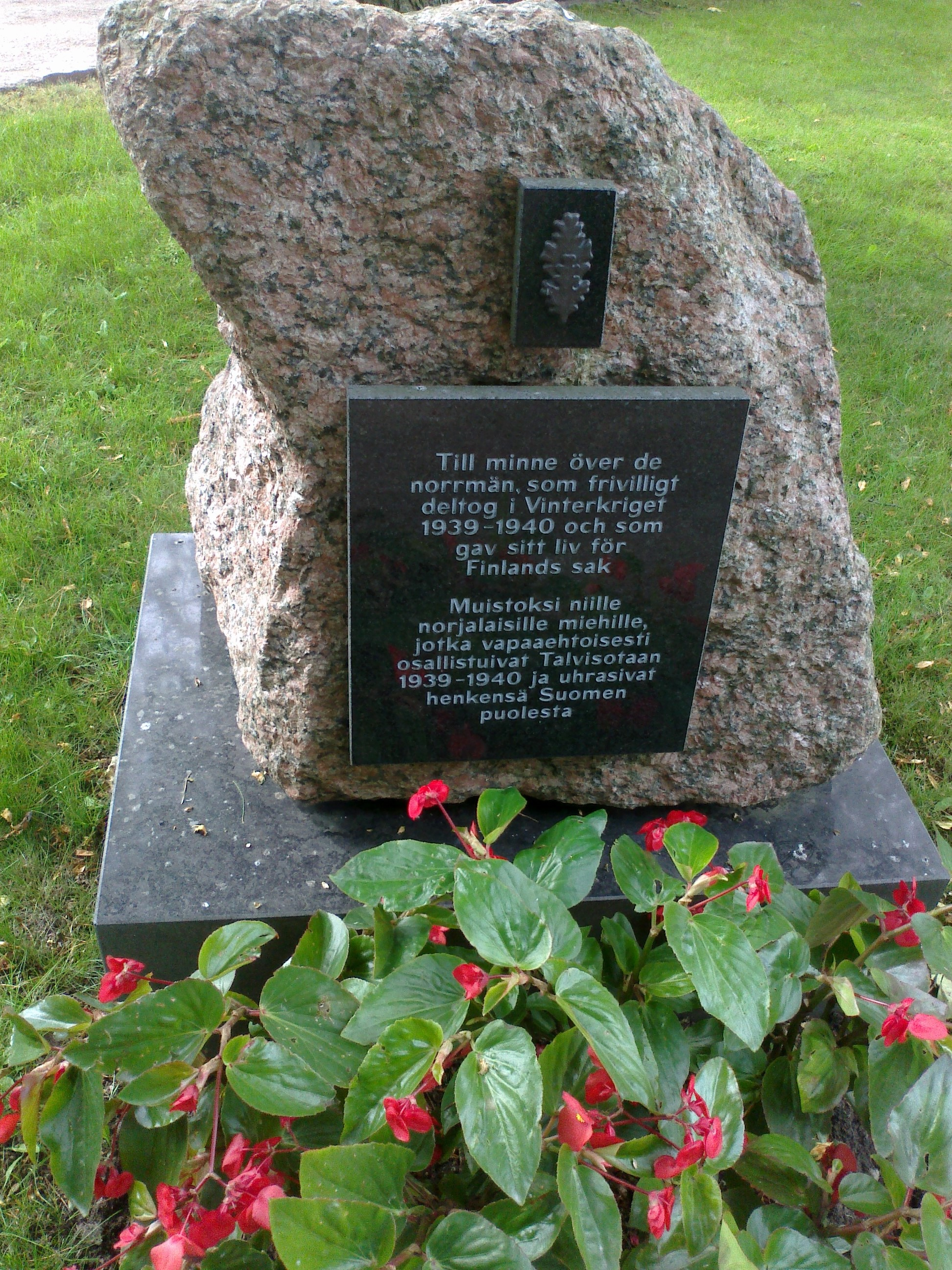
Memorial monument in honour of Norwegian volunteers who lost their lives in the Winter War between the Soviet Union and Finland in 1939-1940

There are around 2,000 Norwegians living in Finland and around 6,665 Finns (15-60,000 including Kvens) living in Norway.

== Resident diplomatic missions ==
- Finland has an embassy in Oslo.
- Norway has an embassy in Helsinki.

== Gallery ==
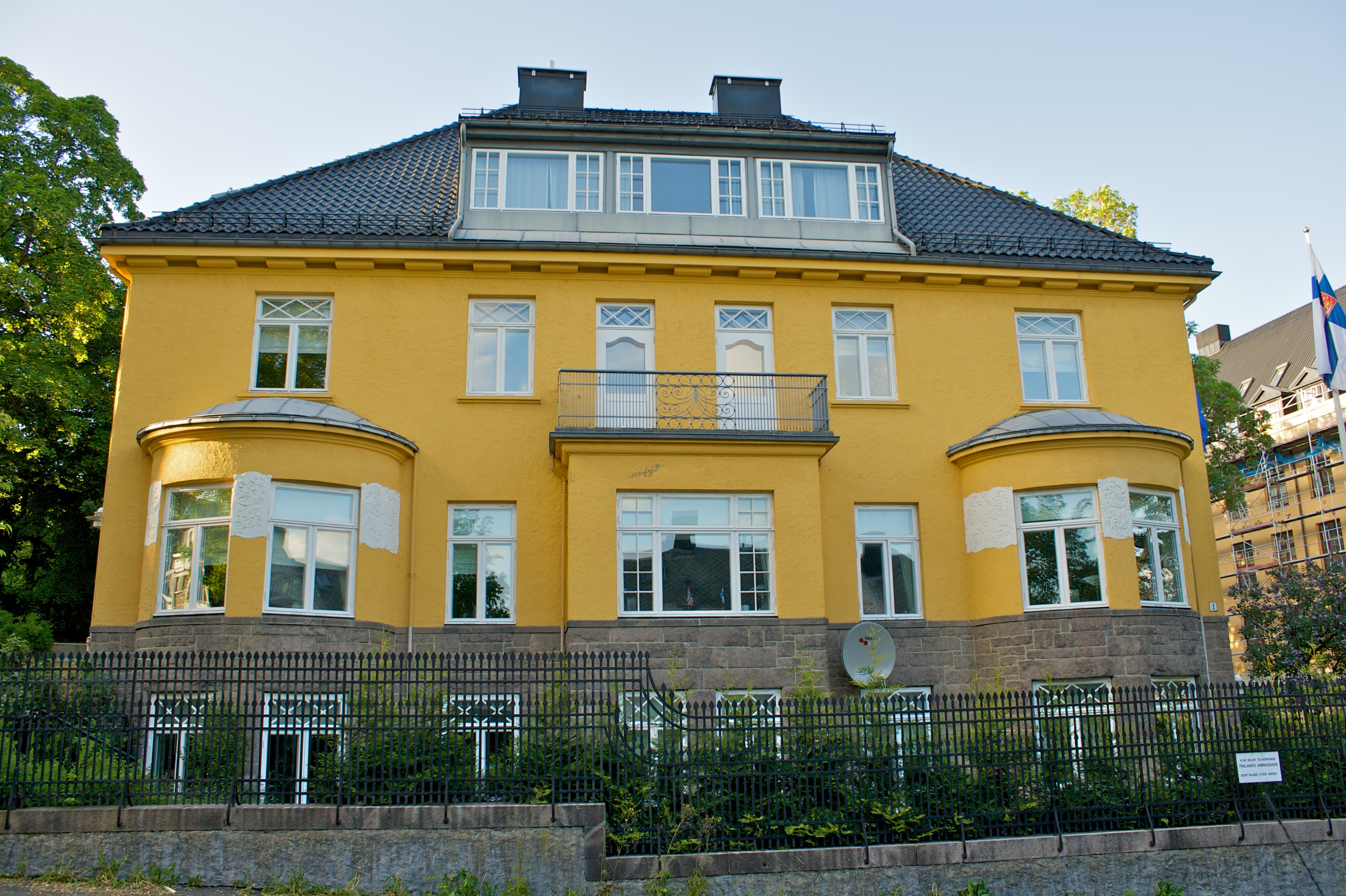
Embassy of Finland in Oslo

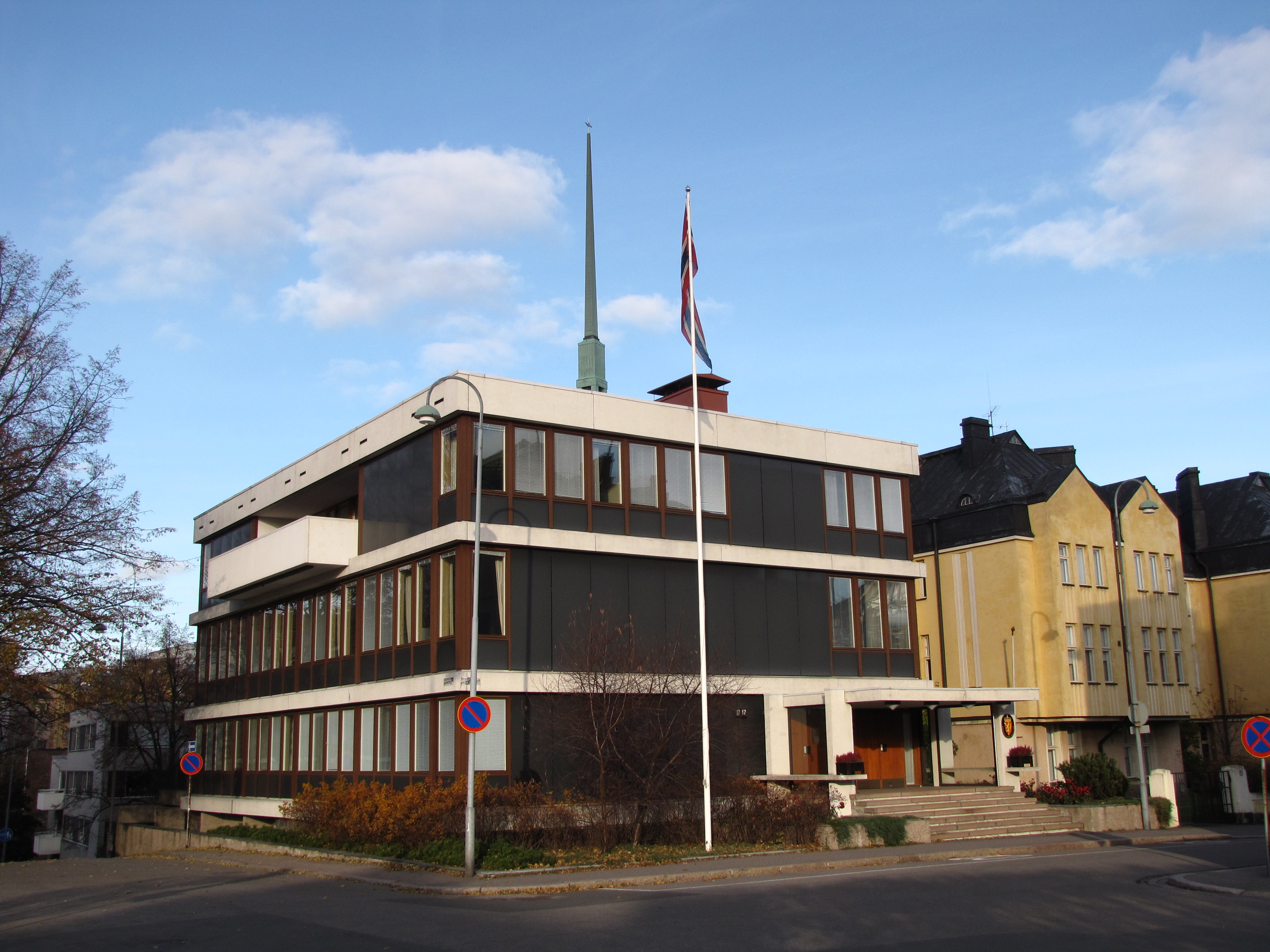
Embassy of Norway in Helsinki

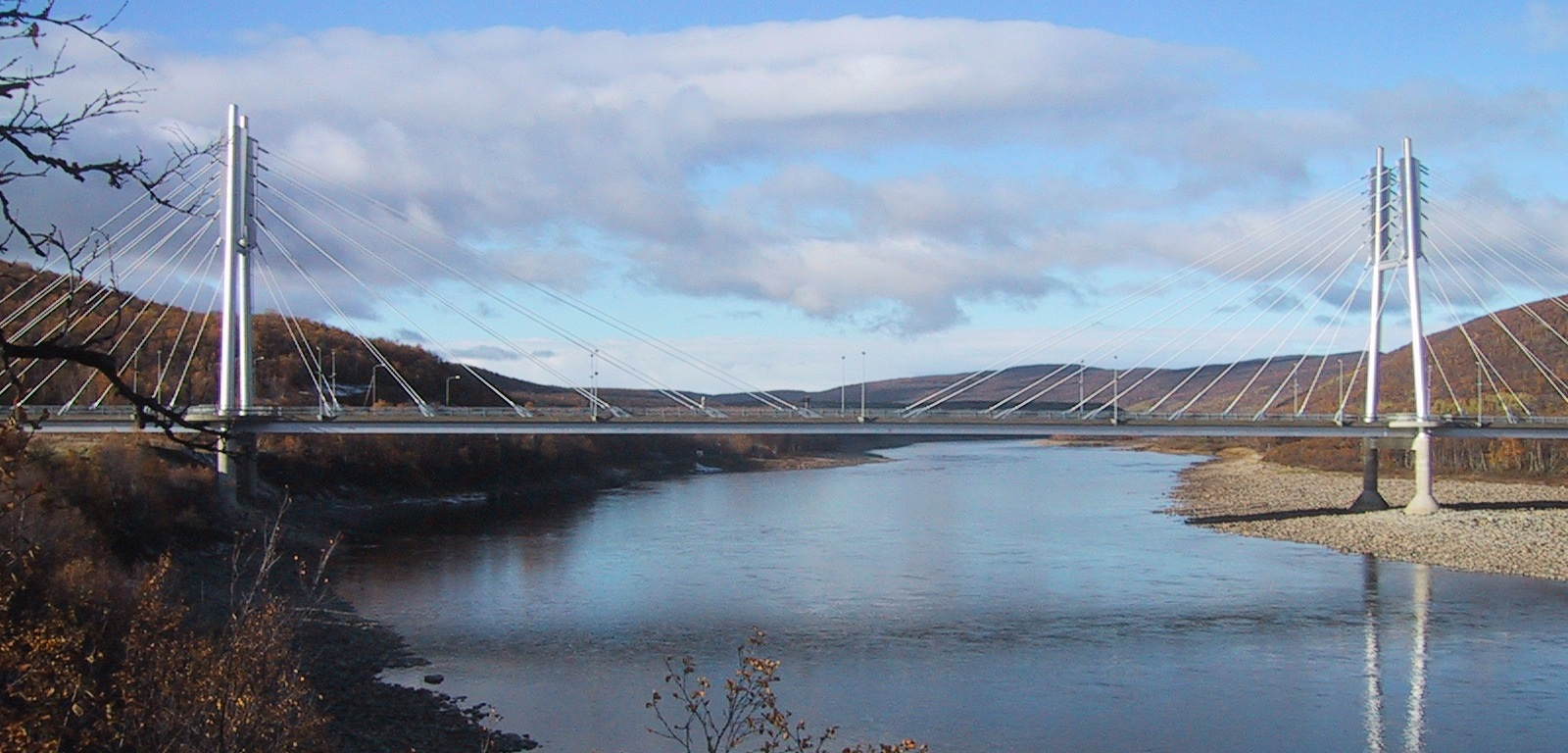
Sami Bridge are the national Finnish–Norwegian border crossing point which is located in Utsjoki

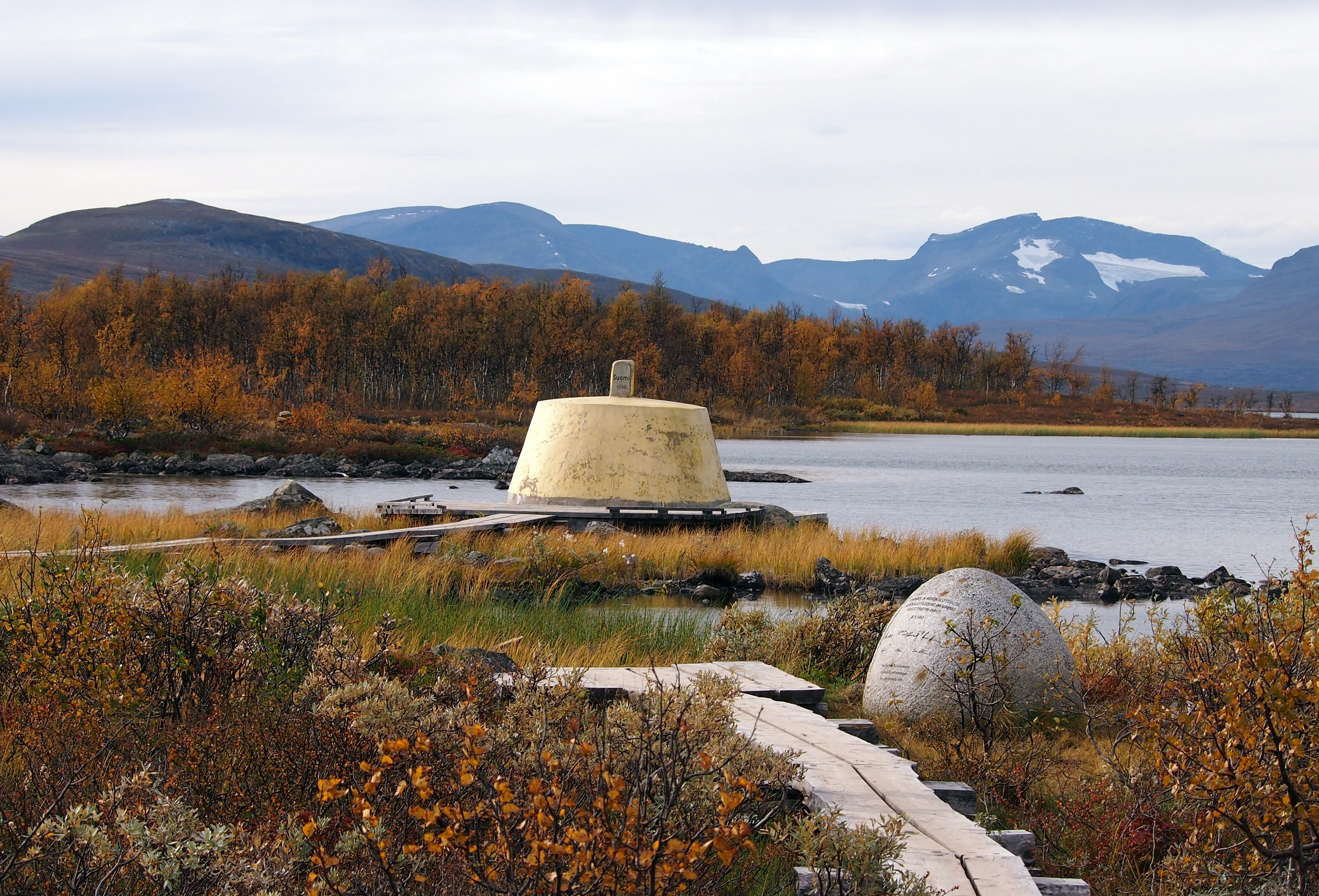
Three-Country Cairn is the point at which the international borders of Sweden, Norway and Finland meet

== See also ==
- Foreign relations of Finland
- Foreign relations of Norway
- Norway–EU relations
- Norwegians in Finland
- Finland–Norway border
