= Norwegians in Finland =

Nordmenn i Finland Norjalaiset Suomessa
- (Norway) (Finland)

Total population
- 2,156

Regions with significant populations
- Helsinki, Oulu, Lapland

Languages
- Norwegian · Finnish

Religion
- Christianity (predominantly Lutheranism)

Related ethnic groups
- Norwegians

Norwegians in Finland are immigrants born in Norway, citizens of Norway or speakers of the Norwegian language living in Finland.

== History ==
In 1872, Hans Gutzeit, a Norwegian, founded a sawmill in Kotka, which grew to be Stora Enso, which still operates. Gutzeit brought at least 200 sawmill workers from Norway, of which some brought their family as well. Many of them settled in Finland permanently, and established communities in the middle of Finnish rural regions. Mass migration was rare in Finland until this point. Norwegians had a significant impact in Kotka. In 1875 there were 130-140 Norwegians in Kotka, one sixth of the population. Norwegians also established communities in Oulu, and founded several sawmills across Finland. Norwegians had a notable presence in Kemi. The tenth Finnish President Martti Ahtisaari is a descendant of the sawmill workers.

Finns had an hatred towards Norwegians, since they had a higher pay and a higher position in the society. Norwegians usually didn't pay taxes. In the 1920s and 1930s, most Norwegians acquired Finnish citizenship. In 1882, Norwegians started to be assimilated into the Finnish culture. However, Finns with Norwegian ancestry still retain their Norwegian identity.

== Demographics ==
Historical population
Year	Pop.	±%
1920*	460	—
1924*	457	−0.7%
1980*	306	−33.0%
1990	852	+178.4%
1995	865	+1.5%
2000	954	+10.3%
2005	1,233	+29.2%
2010	1,520	+23.3%
2015	1,690	+11.2%
2018	1,812	+7.2%
Source: Statistics Finland, * = Norwegian citizens

According to the International migrant stock: The 2017 revision, there were 2,156 Norwegian immigrants living in Finland. Most of them live in Helsinki, Oulu and Northern Finland.

They make the most in Utsjoki (2.65%), Larsmo (0.77%) and Enontekiö (0.69%).

Of the Norwegian citizens, 58.8% are male. 337 Norwegian men are in a registered relationship with a Finnish woman. 45.4% of Norwegians are employed, 7.7% unemployed and 46.9% outside the labour force. Of the labour force, 85.6% are employed and 14.4% unemployed. There were 44 Norwegian entrepreneurs in 2017.

== Norwegian language in Finland ==
The northernmost municipalities of Finland (Inari, Enontekiö and Utsjoki) want to increase teaching of the Norwegian language in schools. The school curriculum however doesn't include Norwegian and it can only be learned as an optional subject. Enontekiö tries to get Norwegian to be included in the school curriculum, since the inhabitants of Enontekiö have many connections and bonds to Norway. In Ivalo ala-aste, 56 pupils learn Norwegian. Oulu considers making Norwegian one of the official languages. Norwegian can be learned several colleges.

== Notable people ==
- Marko Ahtisaari, technology entrepreneur and musician
- Martti Ahtisaari, politician
- Leif Wager, actor
- Elisabeth Nauclér, politician and jurist
- Hans Gutzeit, businessman

== See also ==
- Finland–Norway relations
- Norwegian diaspora
- Immigration to Finland
