= Haplogroup IWX (mtDNA) =

Obsolete haplogroup

In human genetics, Haplogroup IWX was a human mitochondrial DNA (mtDNA) haplogroup.

It was thought to cluster haplogroups I, W, and X. Studies suggested haplogroup IWX to be highly protective against AIDS progression. It is now known that Haplogroup I is descendant of Haplogroup N1. It has also been proposed that Haplogroup W be placed as a descendant of Haplogroup N2b.
