= Ural Swedes =

Languages
- Swedish, Russian

Religion
- Orthodox Christians, Roman Catholicism

Related ethnic groups
- Swedes, Cossacks

The Ural Swedes, (Swedish: uralsvenskar, Russian: Уральские шведы) were Yaik Cossacks (later Orenburg Cossacks) with Swedish ancestry, related to the large groups of Swedish prisoners of the Great Northern War (1700–1721).

== History ==
During the Great Northern War, at least 120,000 men surrendered and were held in Russian administered POW camps until the war ended. After the defeats at Poltava and Perevolochna there were about 20,000 to 25,000 Swedes that capitulated Individual surrenders were uncommon, usually a large unit surrendered all its men. Most of them were put to work in Ukraine, Moscow and Saint Petersburg. Another large group was moved into Siberia and Ural, where they began working in mining under the command of Vasily Tatishchev.

About 8,000 Swedes joined the Russian Army to survive, so Peter I put them in Astrakhan Garrison and on Ural Cossack Line to protect Russian land against Kazakhs and Kirgizian riders, where they joined the military expeditions of Bekovich-Cherkassky to Khiva, Swedes quickly converted to Eastern Orthodox Christianity and received linguistic assimilation with the local Russians. Later Ural Cossacks were used to support the Orenburg Cossacks Line, in Sakmara. Another group was moved to Vozdvizhenskaya fortress in 1745 and thanks to isolation they kept some language and cultural identification until the beginning of the 20th century.
