= Norwegian Canadians =

Canadians with Norwegian ancestry

Norsk-kanadiere (Norwegian) Norvégo-canadiens (French)
- Norwegian ancestry by census division (2021)

Total population
- 463,275 (1.3%) (by ancestry, 2016 Census)

Regions with significant populations
- Alberta: 156,595
- British Columbia: 138,430
- Saskatchewan: 68,640
- Ontario: 59,335
- Manitoba: 19,600

Languages
- Canadian English; Canadian French; Norwegian

Religion
- Christianity (predominantly Lutheranism with other notable Christian minorities); Irreligion

Related ethnic groups
- Norwegians, Norwegian Americans, Norwegian Australians, Norwegian New Zealanders, Dutch Canadians, Danish Canadians, Swedish Canadians, Flemish Canadians

Norwegian Canadians (Norwegian: Norsk-kanadiere) refer to Canadian citizens who identify themselves as being of full or partial Norwegian ancestry, or people who emigrated from Norway and reside in Canada.

Norwegians are one of the largest northern European ethnic groups in the country and have contributed greatly to its culture, especially in Western Canada.

According to the Canada 2016 Census there were 463,275 Canadians, or 1.3%, who claimed Norwegian ancestry, an increase compared to the 452,705 in the 2011 Census.

Significant Norwegian immigration took place from the mid-1880s to 1930.

== History ==
Norwegian Canadian Population History
Year	Pop.	±%
1921	68,856	—
1931	93,243	+35.4%
1941	100,718	+8.0%
1951	119,266	+18.4%
1961	148,681	+24.7%
1971	179,290	+20.6%
1981	102,735	−42.7%
1986	243,680	+137.2%
1991	286,235	+17.5%
1996	346,310	+21.0%
2001	363,760	+5.0%
2006	432,515	+18.9%
2011	452,705	+4.7%
2016	463,275	+2.3%
Source: Statistics Canada Note: 1981 Canadian census did not include multiple ethnic origin responses, thus population is an undercount.

=== Viking exploration ===
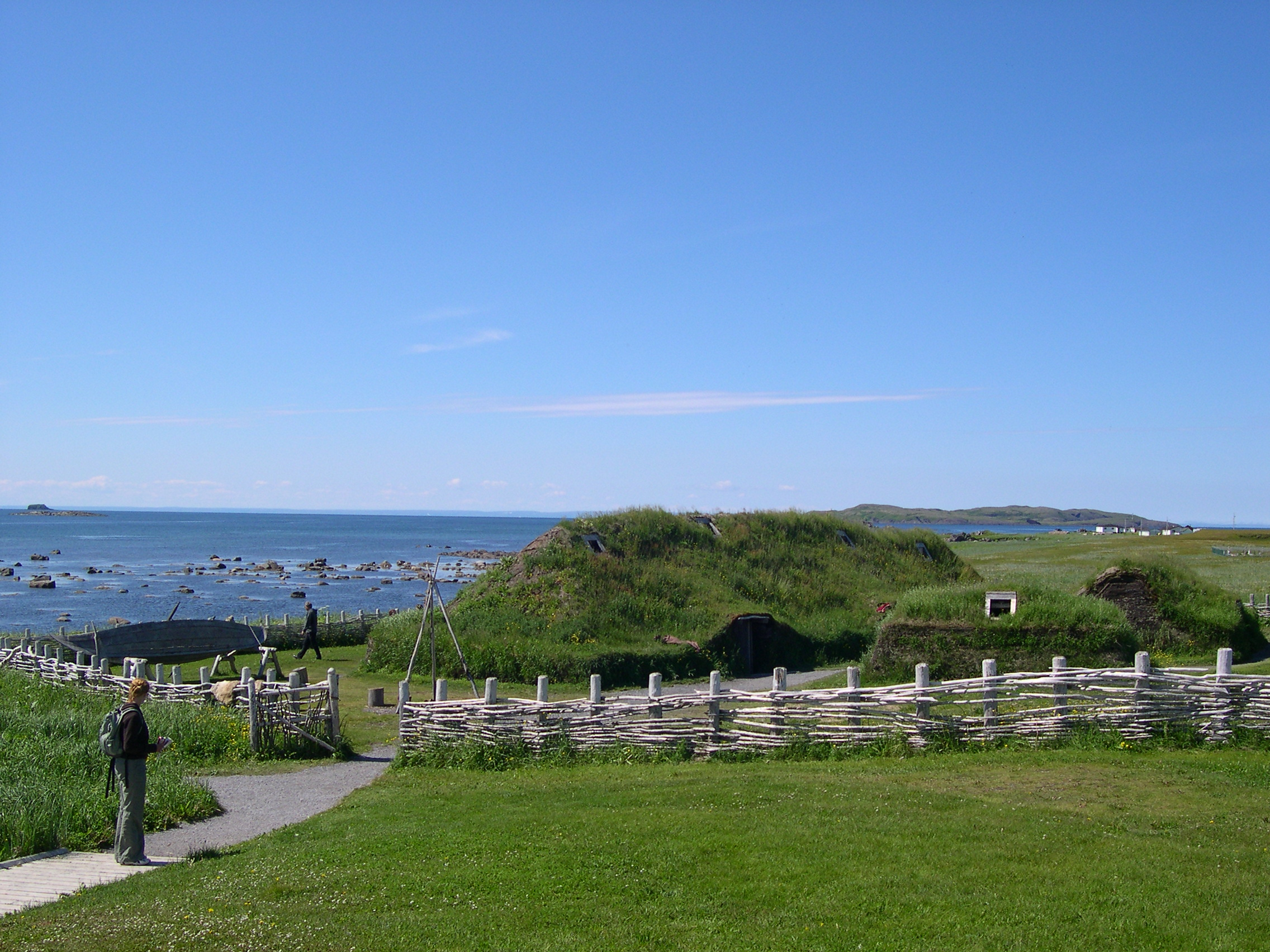
L'Anse aux Meadows in Newfoundland and Labrador

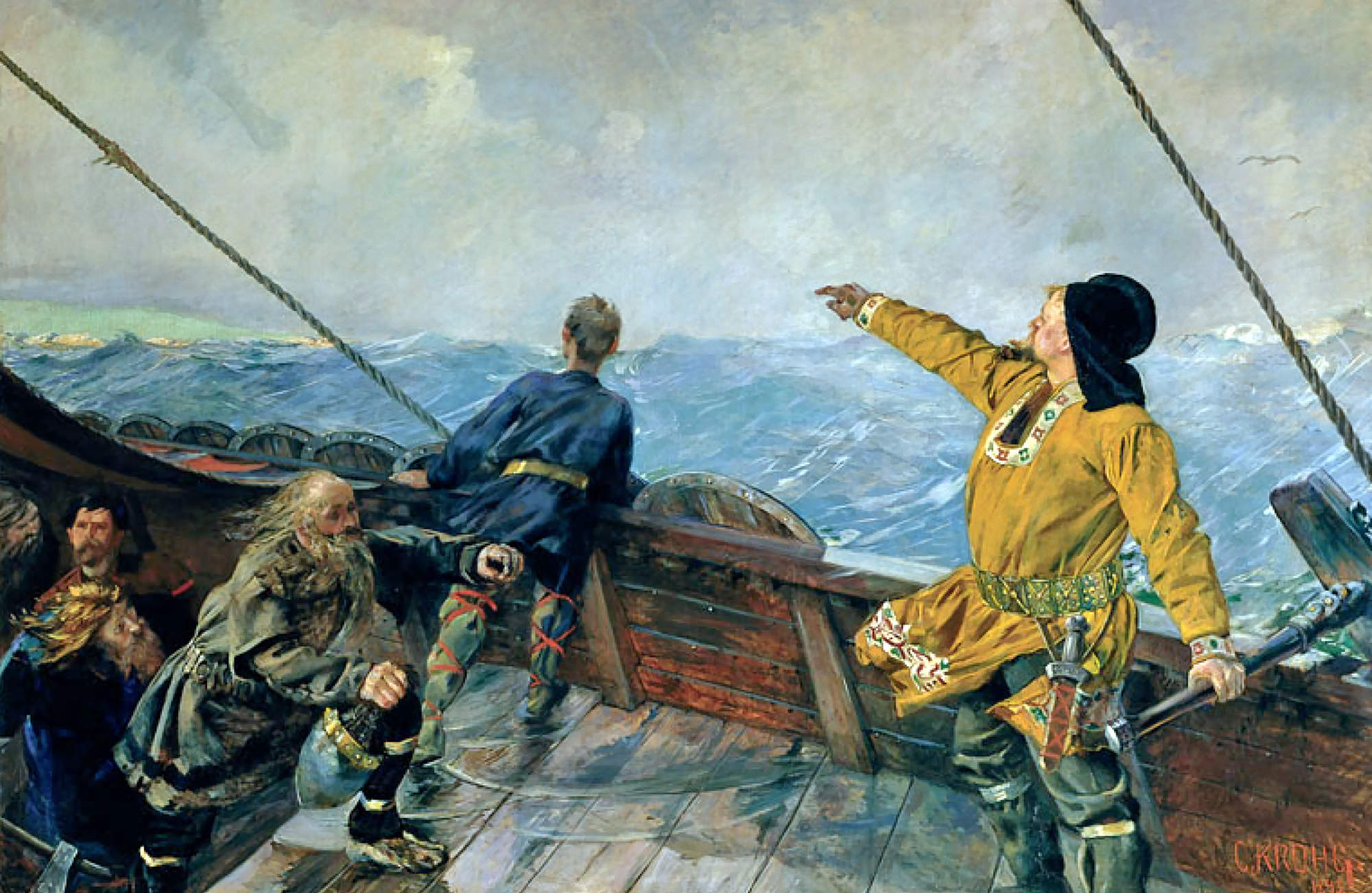
Leif Ericson discovered Canada and North America.

Norwegians have played important roles in the history of Canada. The first Europeans to reach North America were Icelandic Norsemen, who made at least one major effort at settlement in what is today the Canadian province of Newfoundland and Labrador (L'Anse aux Meadows) around 1000 AD. Snorri Thorfinnsson aka Snorri Guðriðsson, the son of Thorfinn Karlsefni and his wife Guđriđ, is thought to be the first white baby born in Canada and North America.

In 1960 archaeological evidence of the only known Norse settlement in North America (outside of Greenland) was found at L'Anse aux Meadows on the northern tip of the island of Newfoundland, in what is now the Canadian province of Newfoundland and Labrador. Although this proved conclusively the Vikings' pre-Columbian discovery of North America, whether this exact site is the Vinland of the Norse accounts is still a subject of debate. There is a consensus among scholars that the Vikings did reach North America, approximately five centuries prior to the voyages of Christopher Columbus.

The main sources of information about the Norse voyages to Vinland are two Icelandic sagas, The Saga of Eric the Red and the Saga of the Greenlanders. These stories were preserved by oral tradition until they were written down some 250 years after the events they describe. The existence of two versions of the story shows some of the challenges of using traditional sources for history, because they share a large number of story elements, but use them in different ways. For example, both sagas feature a mariner called Bjarni, who is driven off course on a voyage to Greenland, and whose authority is subsequently called into question; in "Greenlanders" he is Bjarni Herjolfsson, who discovers the American mainland as a result of his mishap, but in "Eric" he is Bjarni Grimolfsson, who is driven into an area infested with shipworms on the way home from Vinland, with the result that his ship sinks. A brief summary of the plots of the two sagas shows many more examples.

=== Organized immigration ===
The major reason for Norwegian migration appears to be one of economics. Farms in Norway were often small and unable to support a family. Added to that was the lack of other employment to augment the family income. Between 1850 and 1910 approximately 681,011 Norwegians made their way to North America. Very few originally stayed in Canada but some, after a stay in the American Midwest, made their way across the border and settled in the present provinces of Alberta and Saskatchewan. One of the earliest Norwegian parties to America in the nineteenth century sailed from Stavanger. This party was led by Kleng Pedersen (Cleng Peerson). The ship, Restauration, of 45 tons, master being Helland, was a rebuilt sloop carrying 52 passengers. To that number was added baby Larson, who was born on the voyage. Many of this party were Quakers, leaving Norway for religious reasons. The voyage took 97 days and they arrived in New York on October 9, 1825. In 1836 the Norden and Den Norske Klippe sailed to America with 167 passengers. Another two vessels sailed the following year.

The British Government repealed the navigation laws in 1849 and from 1850 on, Canada became the port of choice as Norwegian ships carried passengers to Canada and took lumber back to Britain. The Canadian route offered many advantages to the emigrant. "They moved on from Quebec by rail and by steamer for another thousand or more miles for a steerage fare of slightly less than $9.00. Steamers from Quebec brought them to Toronto, then the immigrants often traveled by rail for 93 miles to Collingwood on Lake Huron, from where steamers transported them across Lake Michigan to Chicago, Milwaukee and Green Bay." In 1855 there were eight vessels reported from Norway to Canada in the immigration report, averaging a 45-day crossing. These vessels carried 1,275 passengers. The following year, 14 vessels made the voyage averaging 54 days, and carrying 2,821 passengers. One of these vessels, the Orion from Stavanger, was said to carry 50 paupers all heading for the American West but, due to a lack of funds were sent to Buffalo. The passengers of the Gifion, all proceeded to Wisconsin.

There were a considerable number of deaths among the Norwegians in 1857. Of the 6,507 immigrants who arrived in that year there were 100 deaths. In 1859, however, emigration dropped off with only 16 vessels arriving from Norway carrying 1,756 passengers. Of the over 28,460 Norwegians who came to Canada in the 1850s it is estimated that only 400 remained in Canada the majority moved on into the American west. A small settlement of Norwegians was begun at Gaspe Peninsula, Lower Canada, in 1854. A report in 1859, stated that 25 families, totaling 126 persons, were settled in the Gaspe. They were joined in 1860 by another 50 persons. However, the Norwegians were not content, and after a very hard winter in 1861-2 they began to make their way to the American Midwest. About 14 families who arrived on the ship Flora from Kristiania in 1856 went to the Eastern Townships, near present-day Sherbrooke. They were following in the footsteps of two other Norwegians who settled in this area in 1853. Johan Schroder, who travelled in the United States and Canada in 1863, reported that a group of Norwegian immigrants, led by an agent, settled in Bury in the Eastern Townships in 1856. One of the first settlers in this area was Captain John Svenson who died in 1878.

=== Settlements ===
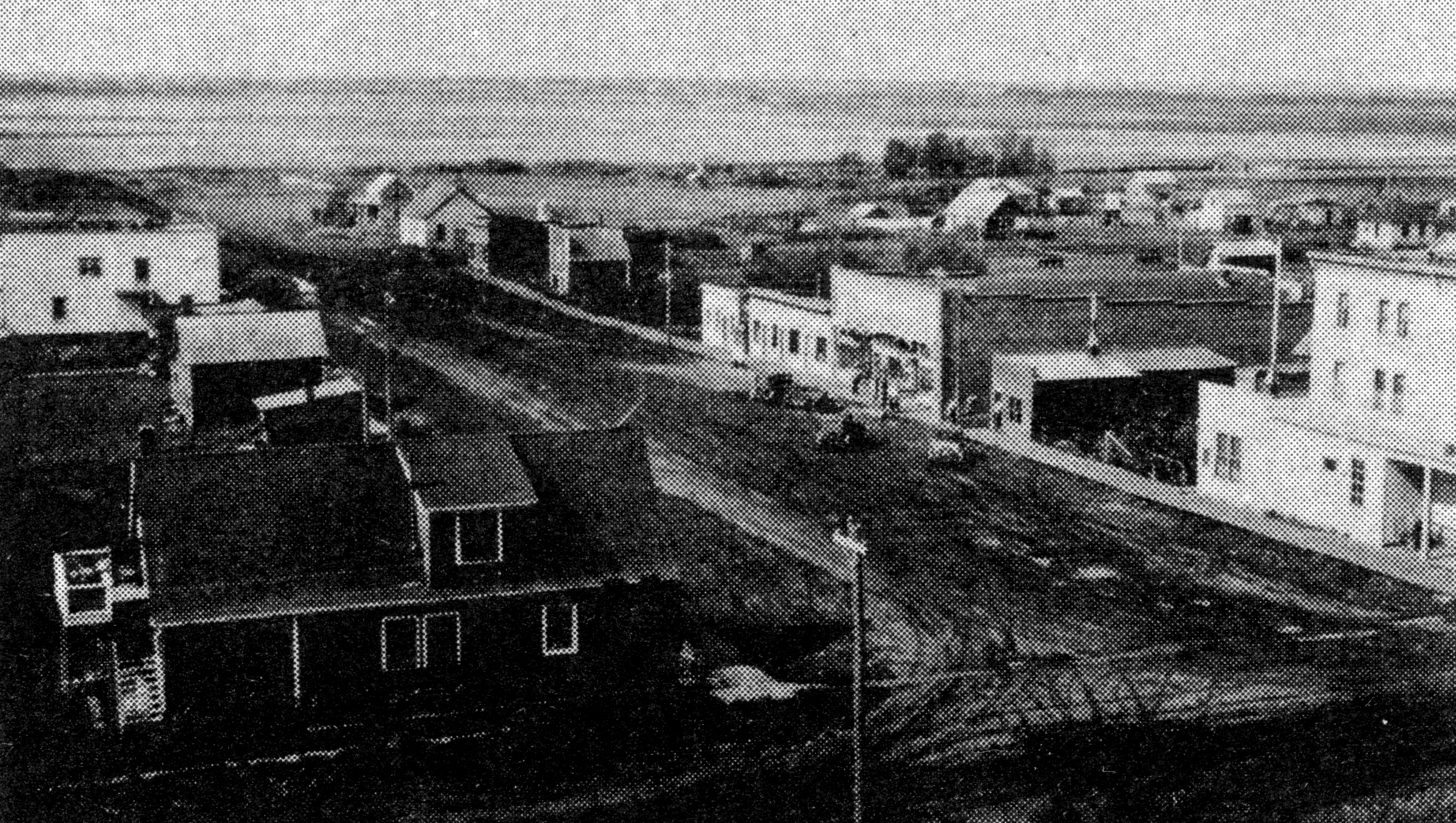
New Norway, Alberta circa 1915

Norwegian Canadians are found throughout the entire country but with a major concentration in Western Canada. The Prairies were the hub of the Norwegian settlement in Canada.

Settlements in Canada which were primarily created by Norwegian immigrants:

- Birch Hills, Saskatchewan
- Rose Valley, Saskatchewan
- Hagensborg, British Columbia
- Tallheo, British Columbia
- Delta, British Columbia
- Quatsino, British Columbia
- Pemberton, British Columbia (originally Agerton)
- New Norway, Alberta
- Norway, Ontario (now Upper Beaches, but probably named after Norway Pines not Norwegian immigrants)

== Geographical distribution ==
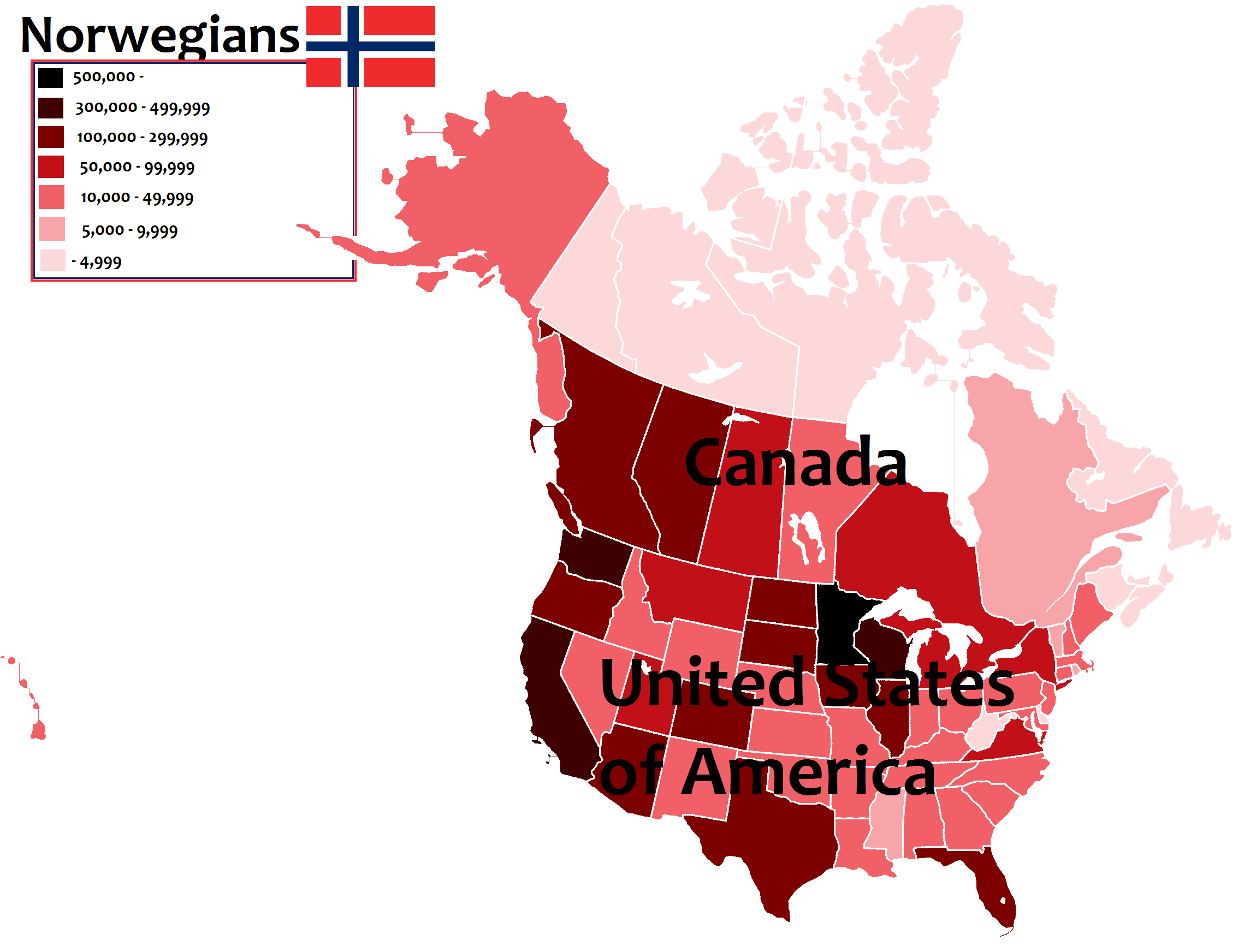
A map of the United States and Canada with number of Norwegian Americans and Norwegian Canadians in every state and province including Washington, D.C.

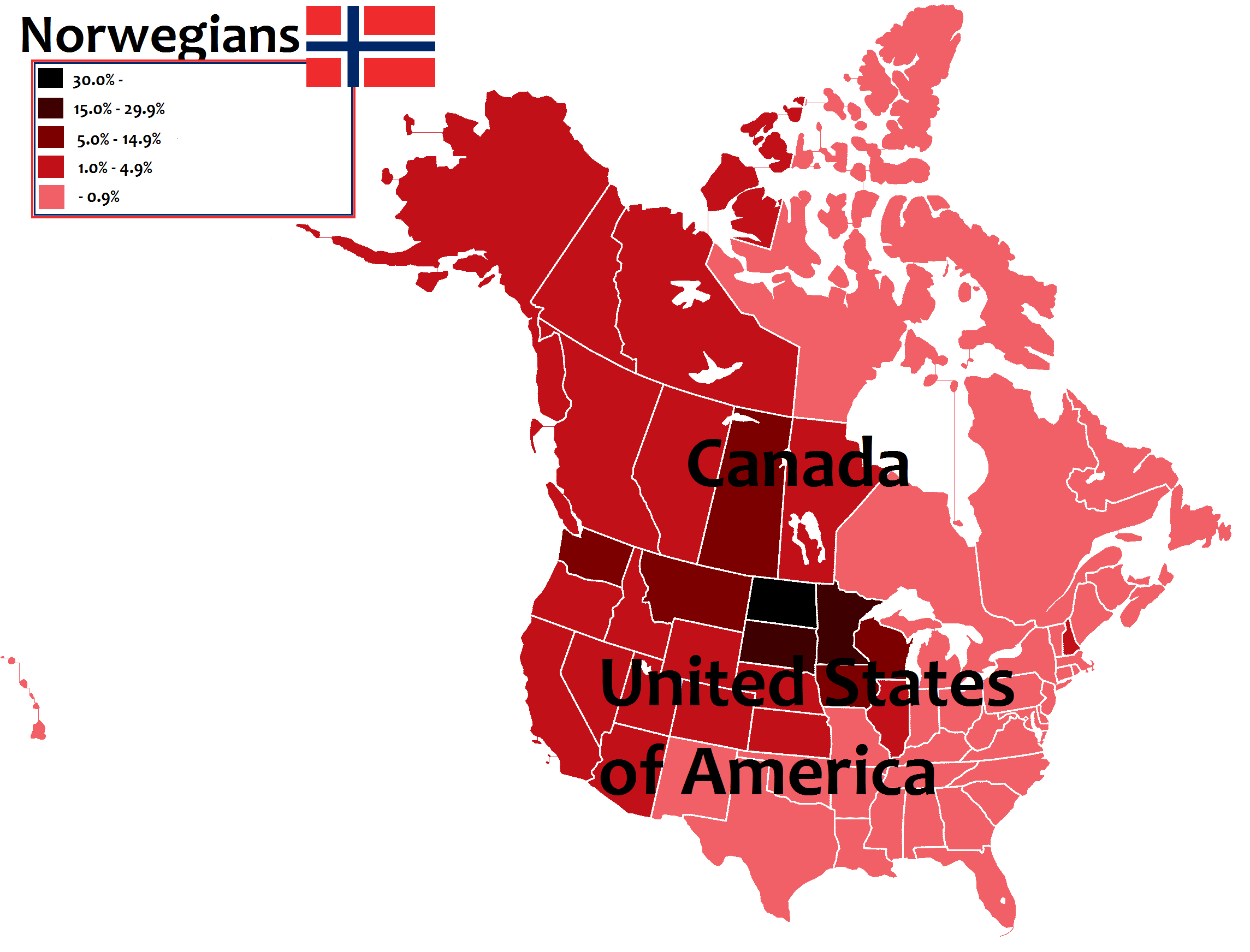
A map of the United States and Canada with percentage of Norwegian Americans and Norwegian Canadians in every state and province including Washington, D.C.

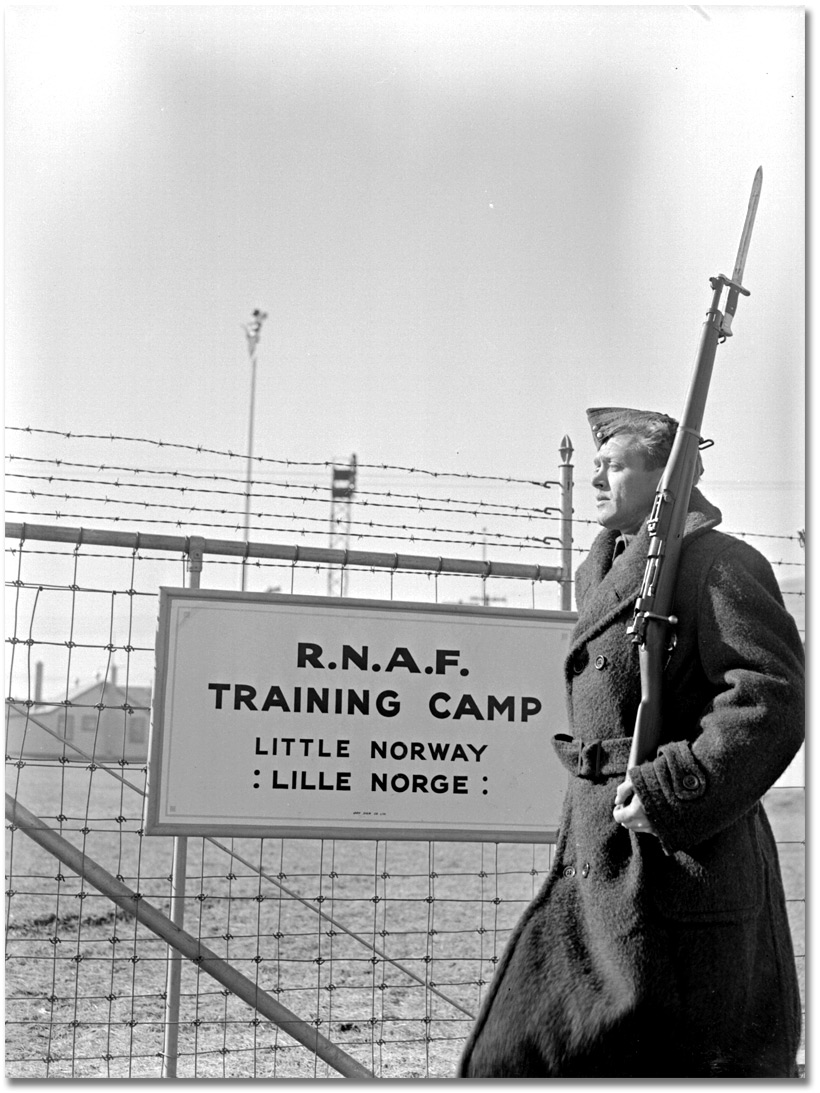
Little Norway, a Norwegian Army Air Service/Royal Norwegian Air Force training camp in Canada during the Second World War

Canada is also the home of Little Norway and Camp Norway, both Norwegian military training facilities, during the Second World War, and the port of Halifax was a refuge for the Norwegian merchant marine and Royal Norwegian Navy during the same conflict.

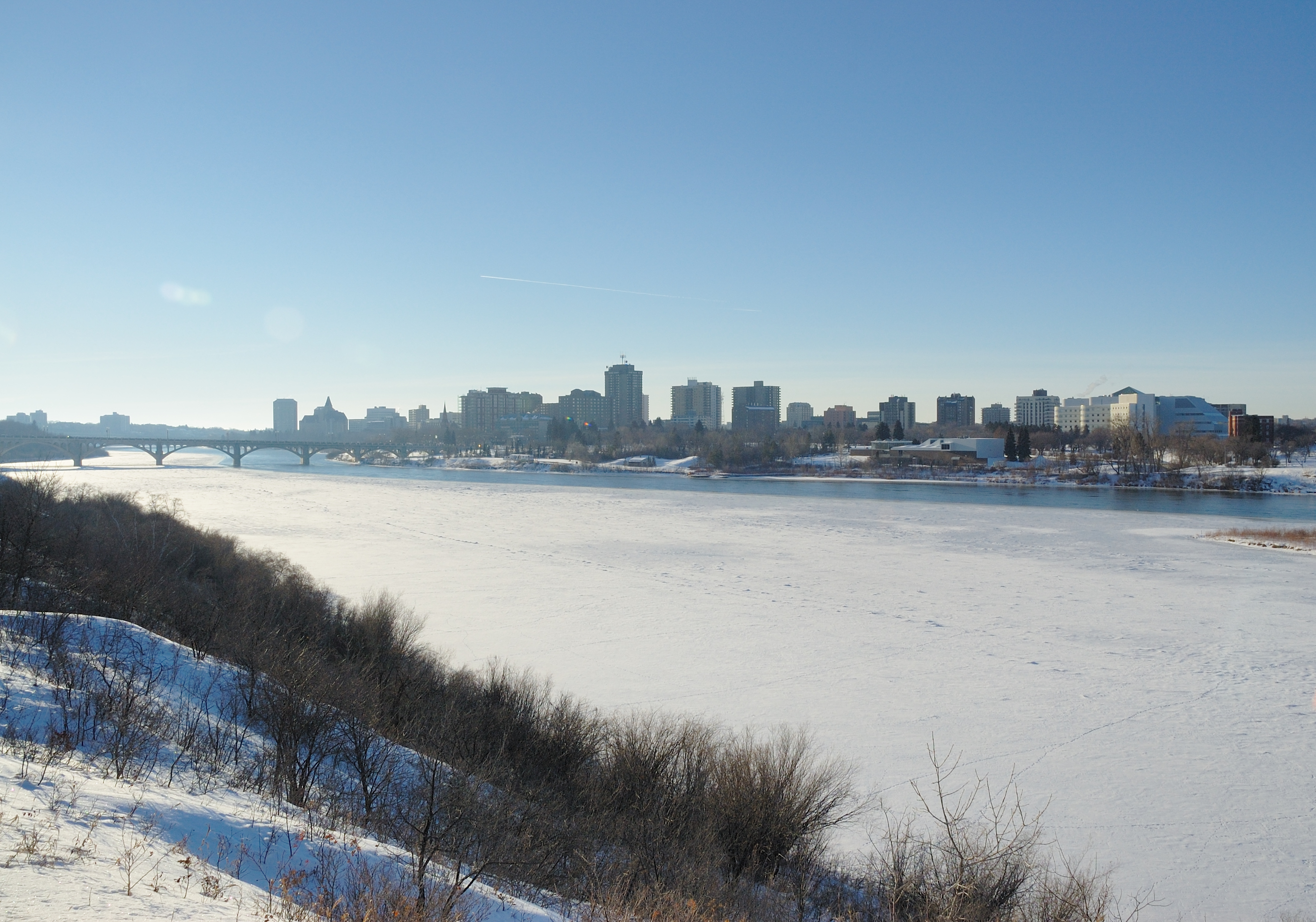
68,640 people in Saskatchewan are of Norwegian ancestry.

According to Statistics Canada figures from the 2016 census, 463,275 Canadians reported themselves as being of Norwegian descent (multiple responses were allowed). The figures are also broken down by provinces and territories for Norwegians:

Province	Norwegian Canadian	Percentage
Canada	463,275	1.3%
Alberta	156,595	3.9%
British Columbia	138,430	3.0%
Saskatchewan	68,640	6.4%
Ontario	59,335	0.4%
Manitoba	19,600	1.6%
Quebec	7,820	0.1%
Nova Scotia	5,170	0.6%
New Brunswick	3,330	0.5%
Newfoundland and Labrador	1,710	0.3%
Yukon	1,380	3.9%
Northwest Territories	710	1.7%
Prince Edward Island	415	0.3%
Nunavut	145	0.4%

== Demography ==
=== Religion ===
Norwegian Canadian demography by religion
Religious group	2021 (Note: Religious breakdown proportions based on "Norwegian" ethnic or cultural origin response on the 2021 census.)		2001 (Note: Religious breakdown proportions based on "Norwegian" ethnic or cultural origin response on the 2001 census.)	
Religious group	Pop.	%	Pop.	%
Christianity	221,565	47.5%	265,085	72.87%
Islam	465	0.1%	140	0.04%
Irreligion	236,380	50.67%	95,835	26.35%
Judaism	740	0.16%	410	0.11%
Buddhism	940	0.2%	635	0.17%
Hinduism	95	0.02%	65	0.02%
Indigenous spirituality	520	0.11%	—N/a	—N/a
Sikhism	90	0.02%	40	0.01%
Other	5,710	1.22%	1,565	0.43%
Total Norwegian Canadian population	466,500	100%	363,760	100%

Norwegian Canadian demography by Christian sects
Religious group	2021		2001	
Religious group	Pop.	%	Pop.	%
Catholic	47,935	21.63%	47,045	17.75%
Orthodox	1,155	0.52%	785	0.3%
Protestant	109,750	49.53%	200,325	75.57%
Other Christian	62,725	28.31%	16,390	6.18%
Total Norwegian Canadian christian population	221,565	100%	265,085	100%

=== Language ===
Most second or third generation Norwegian Canadians today are anglophone, others are bilingual or francophone (particularly in Quebec). Older generations or recent arrivals from Norway may still be allophone (Norwegian as their mother tongue).

Province	Norwegian mother tongue	Percent
Canada	5,035	< 0.01%
British Columbia	2,160	< 0.01%
Ontario	1,020	< 0.01%
Alberta	885	< 0.01%
Saskatchewan	360	< 0.01%
Quebec	230	< 0.01%
Manitoba	130	< 0.01%
Nova Scotia	115	< 0.01%
Newfoundland and Labrador	65	< 0.01%
New Brunswick	50	< 0.01%
Yukon	15	< 0.01%
Prince Edward Island	5	< 0.01%
Nunavut	5	< 0.01%
Northwest Territories	0	0.00%

== List of Canadians of Norwegian descent ==
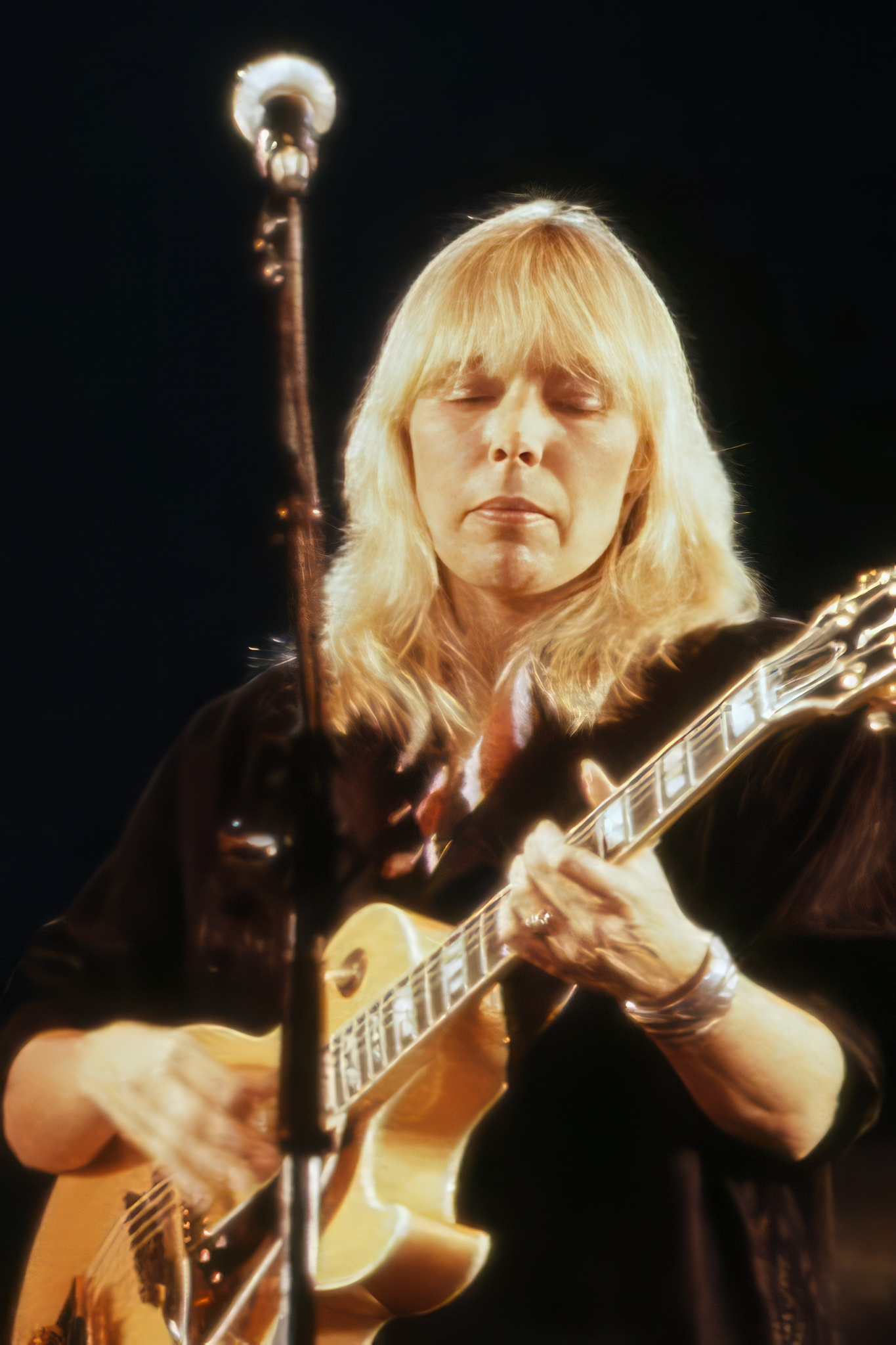
Joni Mitchell, one of the most famous Norwegian Canadians

=== Actors ===
- Melody Anderson, social worker and public speaker specializing in the impact of addiction on families; also known as an actress
- Earl W. Bascom, actor who worked with cowboy singer Roy Rogers
- Devon Bostick, actor, known for playing Rodrick Heffley in the first three Diary of a Wimpy Kid films
- Nathan Fillion, actor
- Melyssa Ford, model/actress
- Christopher Heyerdahl, actor, plays a Norwegian on the AMC TV series Hell on Wheels
- Natassia Malthe, Norwegian model and actress who grew up in Canada
- John Qualen, actor, born Johan Mandt Kvalen in Vancouver, British Columbia in 1899, the son of Norwegian immigrants
- Rachel Skarsten, actress
- Vlasta Vrana, actor

=== Artists ===
- Earl W. Bascom, western artist, sculptor, "Cowboy of Cowboy Artists"

=== Athletes ===
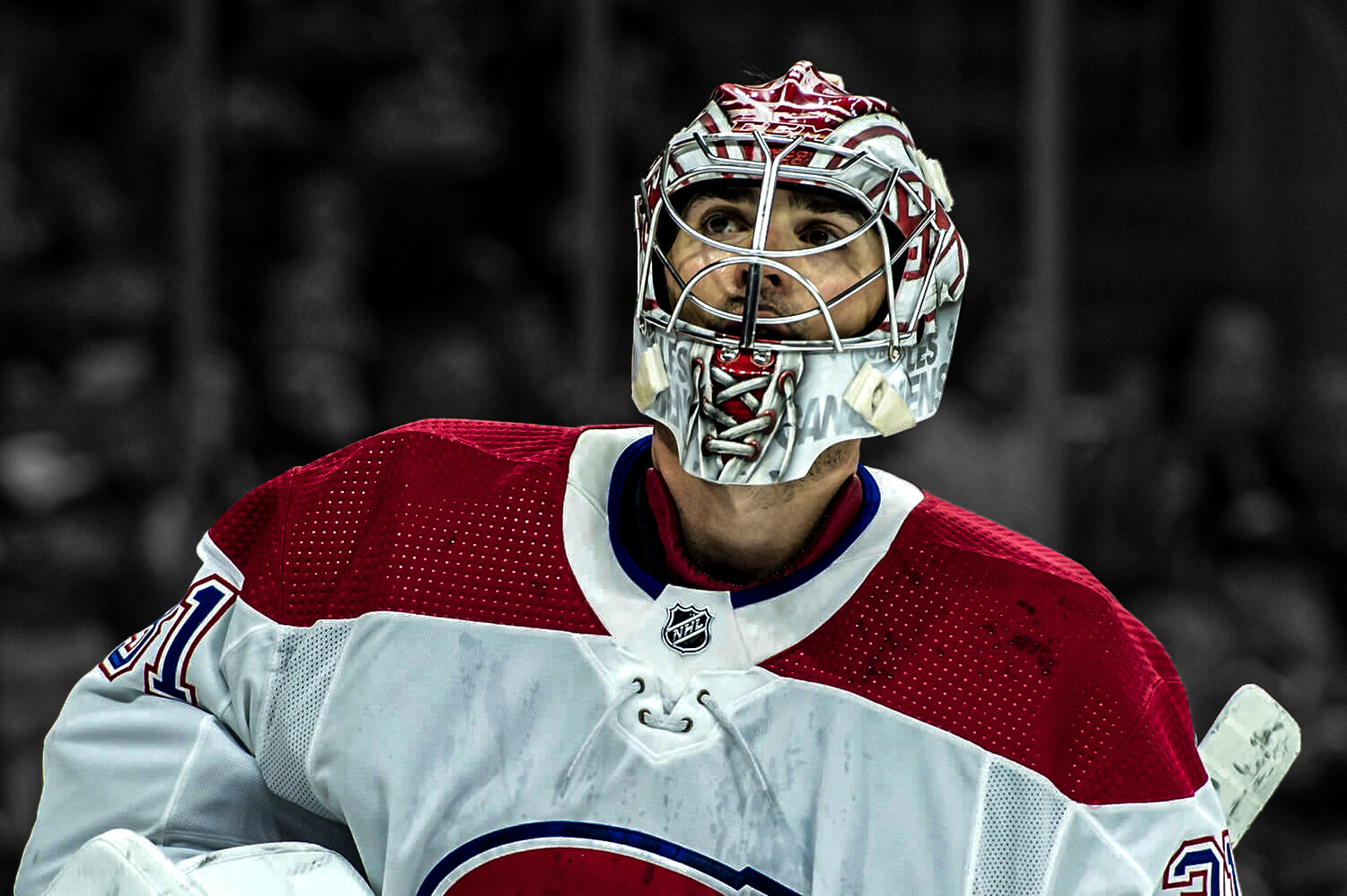
Carey Price with the Montreal Canadiens in January 2020

- Glenn Anderson, retired professional hockey player
- Earl W. Bascom, rodeo pioneer, Canada's Sports Hall of Fame inductee, the "father of modern rodeo"
- Jeff Friesen, retired professional hockey player
- Kristina Groves, Olympic speed skater
- John Halvorsen, Olympic track and field distance runner
- Rick Hansen, wheelchair celebrity and philanthropist
- Anne Heggtveit, alpine skier
- Ryder Hesjedal, professional road cyclist
- George Knudson, CM, professional golfer; along with Mike Weir holds the record for the Canadian with the most wins on the PGA Tour, with eight career victories
- Johann Olav Koss, former Norwegian speed skater, Toronto, ON
- Karen Magnussen, Olympic figure skater, North Vancouver, BC
- Christine Nordhagen, Norwegian-Canadian Olympic female wrestler
- Pat Onstad, professional soccer goalkeeper
- Carey Price, professional ice hockey goaltender
- Terry Puhl, former professional baseball player; former head coach of University of Houston–Victoria's baseball team
- Ryan Rishaug, former ice hockey player; currently a sports commentator on The Sports Network
- Cliff Ronning, professional hockey player
- Hans Skinstad, Norwegian-Canadian 1976 Olympic cross country skier
- Herman "Jackrabbit" Smith-Johannsen (1875–1987), Norwegian-Canadian cross country skier; lived to be 111 years old
- Staal brothers, four ice hockey players, all currently signed with the NHL
- Svein Tuft, professional road cyclist

=== Explorers ===
- Henry Larsen, Norwegian born Canadian Arctic seaman for the Royal Canadian Mounted Police; second to traverse Canada's Northwest Passage in the famous St. Roch

=== Filmmakers ===
- Torill Kove, Norwegian-Canadian film director and animator; Academy Award winner for the animated short film The Danish Poet
- Virginia Tangvald, documentary filmmaker (Ghosts of the Sea)

=== Musicians ===
- Endre Johannes Cleven, musician/composer and founder of the Canadian Viking Regiment (197th Battalion, Canadian Expeditionary Force)
- Mitch Dorge, musician
- Glenn Gould, pianist
- Bruce Haack, Norwegian-Canadian musician and composer
- Joni Mitchell, singer-songwriter
- Leif Vollebekk, musician

=== Politicians ===
- Cam Broten, Saskatchewan NDP MLA for Saskatoon Massey Place
- Ione Christensen, CM, former Canadian senator
- Nellie Cournoyea, premier of the Northwest Territories 1991–1995
- David Eggen, Alberta NDP MLA for Edmonton-Calder
- Colin Hansen, British Columbia's Minister of Finance and Minister; responsible for the 2010 Winter Olympics
- Hans Lars Helgesen, MLA for Esquimalt, 1878–1886; the first non-Briton to serve in the BC legislature and prominent in the establishment of the commercial fishery in Haida Gwaii
- Aaron Paquette, politician, writer and artist
- Chuck Strahl, MP for Chilliwack-Fraser Canyon and Minister of Indian Affairs and Northern Development

=== Writers ===
- Holly Nelson, poet, writer and political activist
- Martha Ostenso, novelist, poet and screenwriter
- Sonja Skarstedt, poet, short story, and play writer; painter and illustrator
- Fred Stenson, writer of historical fiction and non-fiction relating to the Canadian West

=== Others ===
- Gerda Hnatyshyn, president and chair of the Hnatyshyn Foundation, an arts granting organization
- Norman Wolfred Kittson, fur trader, steamboat-line operator, and railway entrepreneur
- Peter Norman Nissen, inventor
- Paul Thorlakson, physician and chancellor of the University of Winnipeg
- Jordan Peterson, professor of Psychology at the University of Toronto

== See also ==
- Norwegian diaspora
- Canada–Norway relations
- European Canadians
- Icelandic Canadians
- Danish Canadians
- Finnish Canadians
- Swedish Canadians
- Dutch Canadians
- Flemish Canadians
