= Norwegians =

Ethnic group native to Norway

Norwegians Nordmenn
Nordmenn
- Distribution of Norwegians worldwide

Total population
- c. 10 million^{a}

Regions with significant populations
- Norway 4,459,166
- United States: 4,642,526
- Canada: 463,275
- Sweden: 48,385
- United Kingdom^{[a]}^{[b]}: 13,798–42,000
- Australia^{[c]}: 31,934
- Denmark: 17,350
- Spain: 11,871
- Germany: 11,000
- Brazil: 10,618
- France: 7,000
- Switzerland: 2,234
- Finland: 2,156
- New Zealand: 1,400
- Iceland: 1,369
- Portugal: 1,086
- Italy: 1,024
- Japan: 424
- Russia: 112

Languages
- Norwegian Standard forms: Bokmål; Nynorsk; Unofficial forms: Riksmål; Høgnorsk

Religion
- Lutheranism (Church of Norway) Historically Norse paganism and Catholic Christianity
- a. Based on table of given countries above. Includes those of partial Norwegian ancestry but does not include people of Faroese, Icelandic, Orcadian or Shetland ancestry. b. There are millions of Britons of Scandinavian ancestry and ethnicity, though mixed with others. c. 2,908 were born in Norway; 31,934 claim Norwegian ancestry or partial Norwegian ancestry.

Norwegians (Norwegian: Nordmenn, lit. 'Northmen') are an ethnic group and nation native to Norway, where they form the vast majority of the population. They share a common culture and speak the Norwegian language. Norwegians are descended from the Norse of the Early Middle Ages who formed a unified Kingdom of Norway in the 9th century. During the Viking Age, Norwegians and other Norse peoples conquered, settled and ruled parts of the British Isles, the Faroe Islands, Iceland and Greenland. Norwegians are closely related to other descendants of the Norsemen such as Danes, Swedes, Icelanders and the Faroe Islanders, as well as groups such as the Scots whose nation they significantly settled and left a lasting impact in, particularly the Northern Isles (Orkney and Shetland).

The Norwegian language, with its two official standard forms, more specifically Bokmål and Nynorsk, is part of the larger Scandinavian dialect continuum of generally mutually intelligible languages in Scandinavia. Norwegian people and their descendants are found in migrant communities worldwide, notably in the United States, Canada, Australia, New Zealand, South Africa and the United Kingdom. Norwegians are traditionally Lutheran since the Reformation in Denmark–Norway and Holstein which made Lutheranism the only legal religion in the country, however large portions of the population are now either non-practicing, atheist or agnostic.

== History ==
Towards the end of the 3rd millennium BC, Proto-Indo-European–speaking Battle-Axe peoples migrated to Norway bringing domesticated horses, agriculture, cattle and wheel technology to the region.

During the Viking Age, Harald Fairhair unified the Norse petty kingdoms after being victorious at the Battle of Hafrsfjord in the 880s. Two centuries of Viking expansion tapered off following the decline of Norse paganism with the adoption of Christianity in the 11th century. During The Black Death, approximately 60% of the population died and in 1397 Norway entered a union with Denmark.

In 1814, following Denmark–Norway's defeat in the Napoleonic Wars, Norway entered a union with Sweden and adopted a new constitution. Rising nationalism throughout the 19th century led to a 1905 referendum granting Norway independence. Although Norway remained officially neutral in World War I, the country was unofficially allied with the Entente powers. In World War II, Norway proclaimed its neutrality, but was nonetheless occupied for five years by Nazi Germany (1940–45). In 1949, neutrality was abandoned and Norway became a member of NATO. Discovery of oil and gas in adjacent waters in the late 1960s boosted Norway's economy but in referendums held in 1972 and 1994, Norway rejected joining the EU. Key domestic issues include integration of a fast-growing immigrant population, maintaining the country's generous social safety net with an aging population, and preserving economic competitiveness.

== Geographic distribution ==
=== Viking Age ===
Norwegian or Norse Vikings raided and settled in Shetland, Orkney, Ireland, Scotland, and northern England. In the United Kingdom, many names for places ending in -kirk, -ness, -thorpe, -toft and -by are likely Norse in origin. In 947, a new wave of Norwegian Vikings appeared in England when Erik Bloodaxe captured York. In the 8th century and onwards, Norwegian and Danish Vikings also settled in Normandy, most famously those led by Rollo; some of their Norman descendants would later expand to England, Sicily, and other Mediterranean islands.

Apart from Britain and Ireland, Norwegian Vikings established settlements in largely uninhabited regions. The first known permanent Norwegian settler in Iceland was Ingólfur Arnarson. In the year 874 he settled in Reykjavík.

After his expulsion from Iceland Erik the Red discovered Greenland, a name he chose in hope of attracting Icelandic settlers. Viking settlements were established in the sheltered fjords of the southern and western coast. Erik's relative Leif Eriksson later discovered North America.

=== Netherlands ===
During the 17th and 18th centuries, many Norwegians emigrated to the Netherlands, particularly Amsterdam. The Netherlands was the second-most popular destination for Norwegian emigrants after Denmark. Loosely estimated, some 10% of the population may have emigrated, in a period when the entire Norwegian population consisted of some 800,000 people.

The Norwegians left with the Dutch trade ships that when in Norway traded for timber, hides, herring, and stockfish (dried codfish). Young women took employment as maids in Amsterdam, while young men took employment as sailors. Large parts of the Dutch merchant fleet and navy came to consist of Norwegians and Danes. Most took Dutch names, leaving no trace of Norwegian names in the later Dutch population.

The emigration to the Netherlands was so devastating to the homelands that the Danish-Norwegian king issued penalties of death for emigration, but repeatedly had to issue amnesties for those willing to return, announced by posters in the streets of Amsterdam. Increasingly, Dutchmen who search their genealogical roots turn to Norway. Many Norwegians who emigrated to the Netherlands, and often were employed in the Dutch merchant fleet, emigrated further to the many Dutch colonies such as New Amsterdam (New York).

=== North America ===
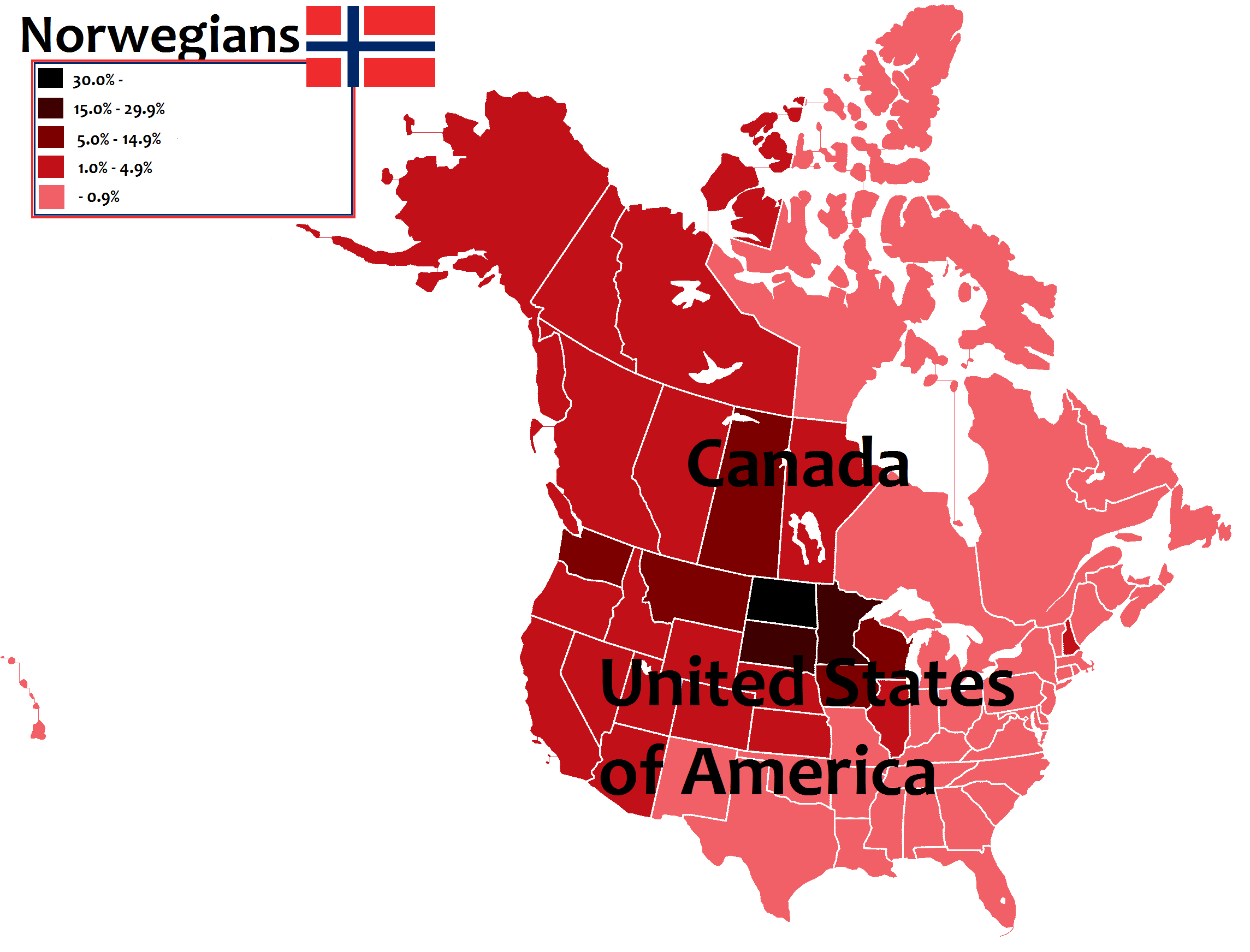
A map of North America, with the percentage of Canadians and Americans of Norwegian descent in each province, territory and state in Canada and the U.S.

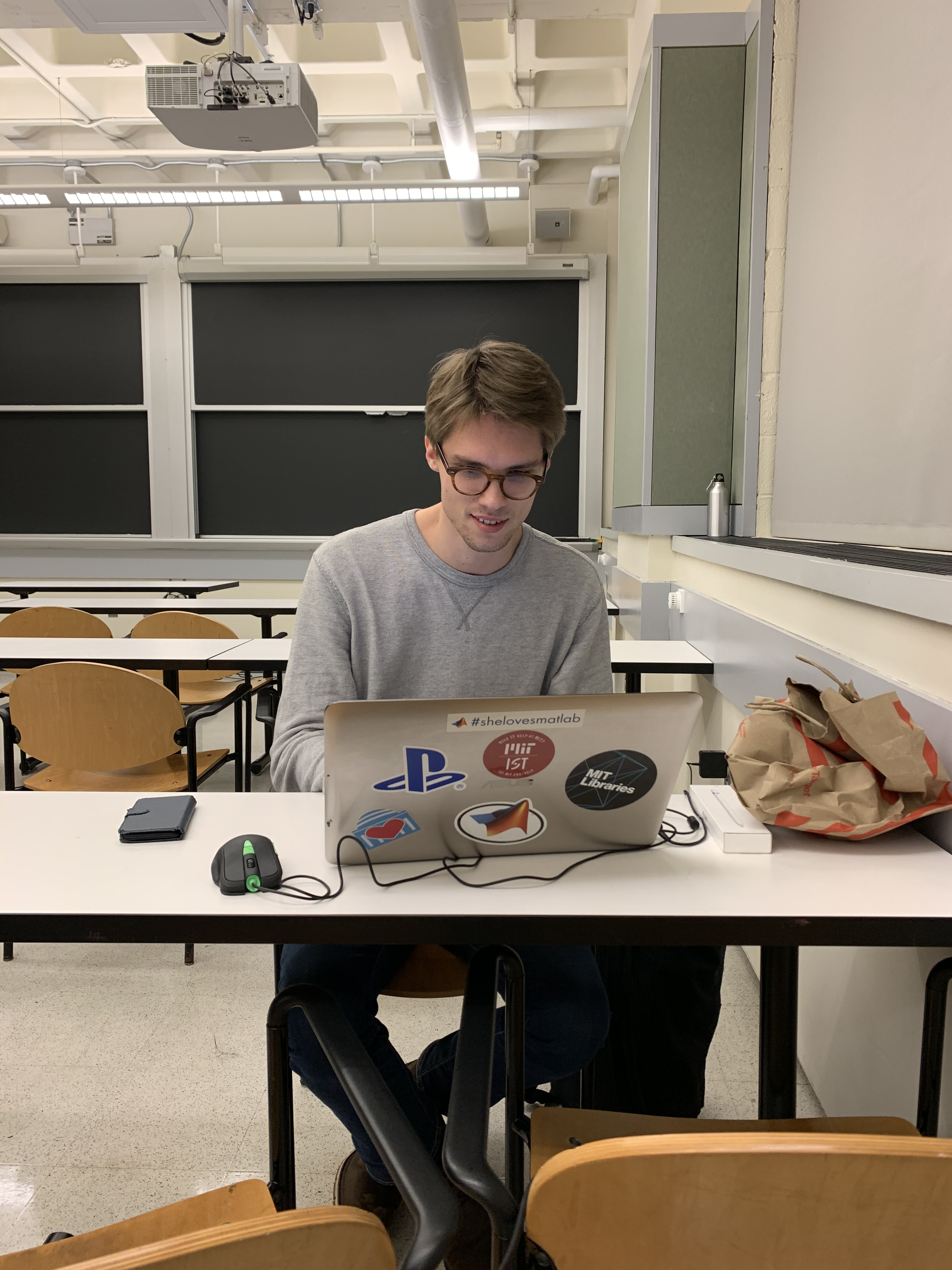
Norwegian student conducting research at the Massachusetts Institute of Technology in the United States

==== United States ====
Many Norwegians emigrated to the US between the 1850s and the 1920s. The descendants of these people are known as Norwegian Americans. Many Norwegian settlers traveled to and through Canada and Canadian ports while immigrating to the United States. In 1850, the year after Great Britain repealed its restrictive Navigation Acts in Canada, more emigrating Norwegians sailed the shorter route to the Ville de Québec (Quebec City) in Canada, to make their way to US cities like Chicago, Milwaukee, and Green Bay by steamship. For example, in the 1850s, 28,640 arrived at Quebec, Canada, en route to the US, and 8,351 at New York directly. According to the 2000 U.S. Census, three million Americans consider Norwegian to be their sole or primary ancestry. It is estimated that as many as a further 1.5 million more are of partial Norwegian ancestry. Norwegian Americans represent 2–3% of the non-Hispanic Euro-American population in the U.S. They mostly live in both the Upper Midwest and Pacific Northwest.

==== Canada ====
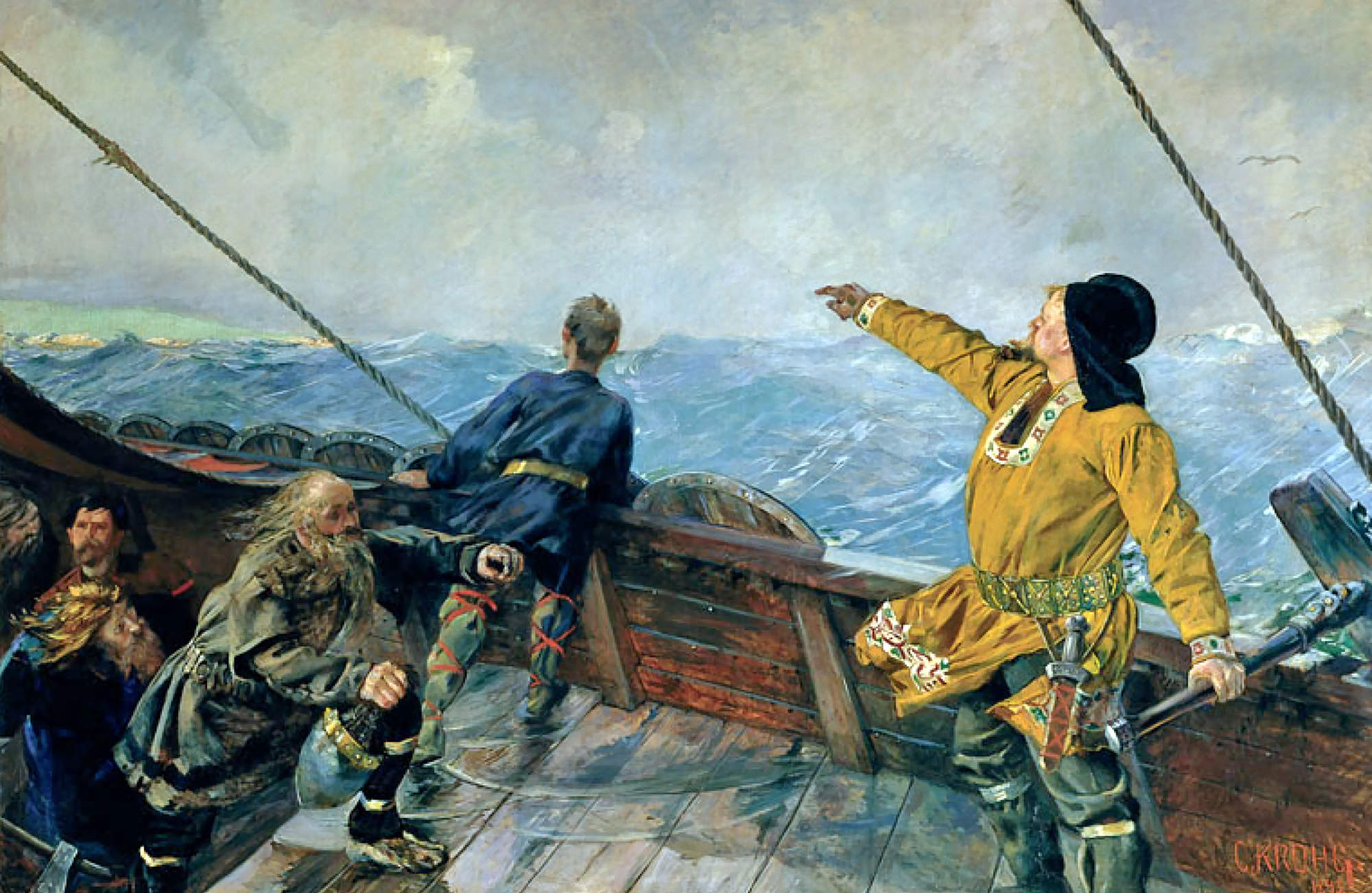
Leiv Eirikson Discovering America (1893) by Christian Krohg

As early as 1814, a party of Norwegians was brought to Canada to build a winter road from York Factory on Hudson Bay to the infant Red River settlement at the site of present-day Winnipeg, Manitoba, Canada. Norway House is one of the oldest trading posts and Native-Canadian missions in the Canadian West. Willard Ferdinand Wentzel served the North West Company of Canada in the Athabasca and Mackenzie regions and accompanied Sir John Franklin on his overland expedition in 1819–20 to the Canadian Arctic.

Norwegian immigration to Canada lasted from the mid-1880s until 1930, although Norwegians were already working in Canada as early as 1814. It can be divided into three periods of roughly fifteen years each. In the first, to about 1900, thousands of Norwegians homesteaded on the Canadian prairies. In the second, from 1900 to 1914, there was a further heavy influx of Norwegians immigrating to Canada from the United States because of poor economic conditions in the US, and 18,790 from Norway. In the third, from 1919 to 1930, 21,874 people came directly from Norway, with the peak year in 1927, when 5,103 Norwegians arrived, spurred by severe depression at home. They came with limited means, many leaving dole queues.

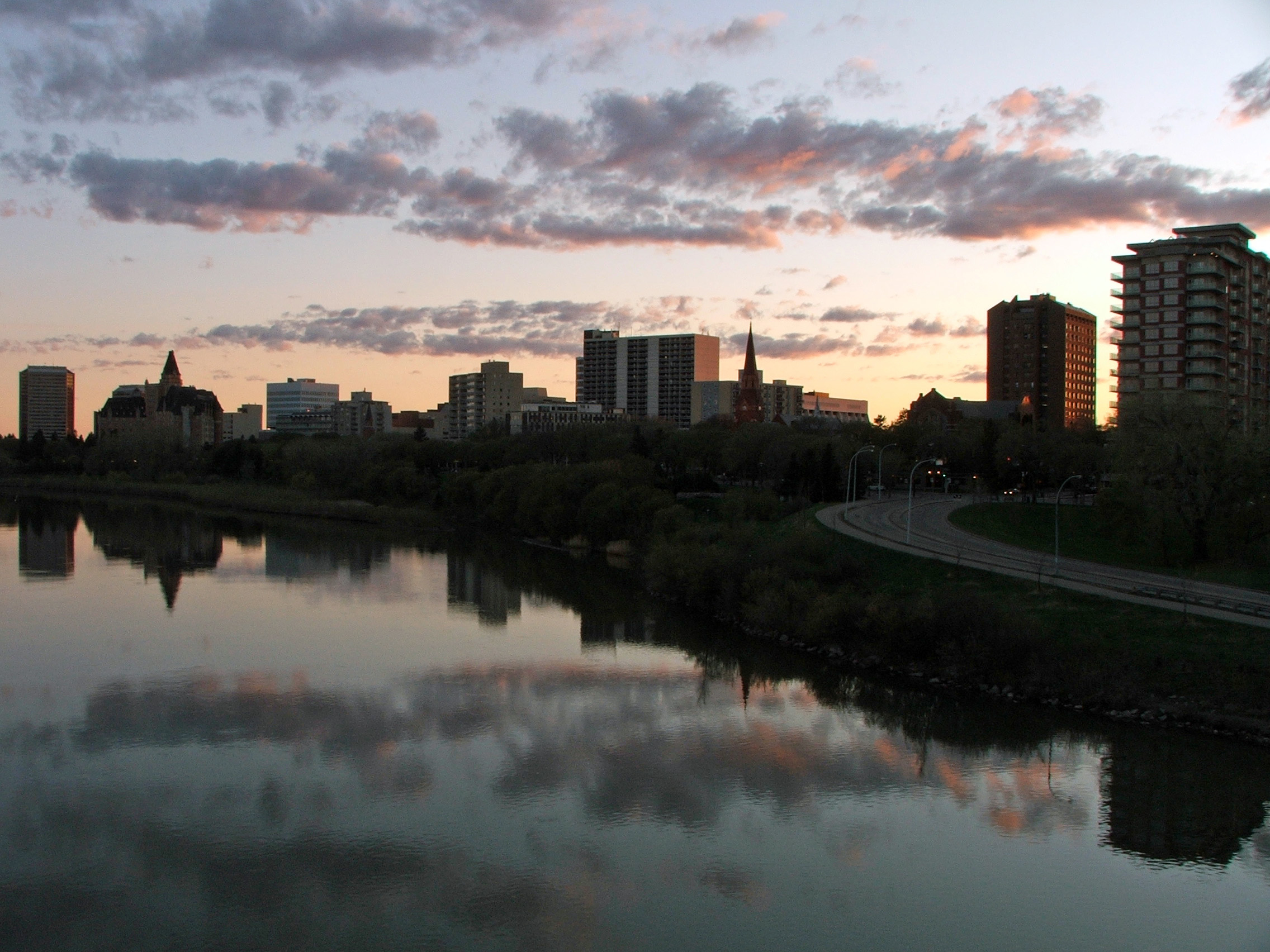
7% of the population in Saskatoon in Canada is of Norwegian ancestry.

From 1825 to 1900 some 500,000 Norwegians landed at Ville du Quebec in Canada (and other Canadian ports) for travelling through Canada was the shortest corridor to the United States' central states. In spite of efforts by the Government of Canada to retain these immigrants for Canada, very few remained because of Canada's somewhat restrictive land policies at that time and negative stories being told about Canada from U.S. land agents deterring Norwegians from going to Canada. Not until the 1880s did Norwegians accept Canada as a land of opportunity. This was also true of the many Americans of Norwegian heritage who immigrated to Canada from the US with "Canada Fever" seeking homesteads and new economic opportunities. By 1921 one-third of all Norwegians in Canada had been born in the US.

These new Canadians became British subjects in Canada, and part of the British Empire. Canadian citizenship, as a status distinct from that of a British subject, was created on 1 January 1947, with Canada being the first Commonwealth country to create their own citizenship. Prior to that date, Canadians were British subjects and Canada's nationality law closely mirrored that of the United Kingdom. On 1 January 1947, Canadian citizenship was conferred on most British subjects connected with Canada. Unlike the US, Canada was part of the British Empire and most Norwegians would have become Canadians and British subjects at the same time.

According to the 2011 Census, 452,705 Canadians reported Norwegian ancestry (Norwegian-Canadians).

=== Australia ===
As of 2011, there were 3,710 Norwegian-born Australians, and 23,037 Norwegians of Australian descent.

=== Russia ===
In the 19th century a community known as the Kola Norwegians settled in the environs of the Russian city of Murmansk. They have suffered persecution under Joseph Stalin and after 1992 were offered a chance to get back to Norway. There are very few of them left there today.

== Genetics ==
According to recent genetic analysis, both mtDNA (mitochondrial DNA) and Y-chromosome polymorphisms showed a noticeable genetic affinity between the Norwegian population and other ethnic groups in Northern and Central Europe, particularly with the Germans. This is due to a history of at least a thousand years of large-scale migration both in and out of Norway.

Norwegians, like most Europeans, largely descend from three distinct lineages: Mesolithic hunter-gatherers, descended from a Cro-Magnon population that arrived in Europe about 45,000 years ago, Neolithic farmers who migrated from Anatolia during the Neolithic Revolution 9,000 years ago, and Yamnaya steppe pastoralists who expanded into Europe from the Pontic–Caspian steppe in the context of Indo-European migrations 5000 years ago.

The Norwegian population is typical of the Northern European population with Haplogroup I1 being the most common Y-haplogroup, at about 37,3%. Norwegians also show the characteristic R1a genes of the paternal ancestorship at 17.9% to 30.8%. Such large frequencies of R1a have been found only in East Europe and India. R1b gene showing paternal descent is also widespread at 25.9% to 30.8%.

Norwegian genetic ancestry also exists in many locations where Norwegians immigrated. In particular, several northern states in the United States (Michigan, Minnesota, North Dakota, South Dakota, and Montana) show Scandinavian (which includes Norwegian) ancestry proportions among European descent (white) persons of 10 to 20%. Similarly, Norwegian ancestry has been found to account for about 25% of ancestry of the population of the Shetland Islands and Danish-Norwegian ancestry has been found to account for about 25% of ancestry of the population of Greenland.

=== Y-chromosome DNA ===
Y-Chromosome DNA (Y-DNA) represents the male lineage, The Norwegian Y-chromosome pool may be summarized as follows where haplogroups R1 & I comprise generally more than 85% of the total chromosomes.

- I – 55%
- R1 – 35%
- NOP ~ 5%
- Other Haplogroups ~ 5%

=== Mitochondrial DNA ===
Mitochondrial DNA (mtDNA) represents the female lineage, Haplogroup H represent about 40% of the Norwegian mitochondrial DNA lineages

- H ~ 40%
- JT ~ 23%
- UK ~ 22%
- IWX ~ 5%
- V ~ 5%
- Other lineages ~ 5%

== Language ==
Norwegian is a North Germanic language with approximately 5 million speakers, of whom most are located in Norway. There are also some speakers of Norwegian in Denmark, Sweden, Germany, Britain, Spain, Canada, and the United States, where the largest community of speakers exists, with 55,311 speakers as of 2000; approximately half of the speakers live in Minnesota (8,060), California (5,865), Washington (5,460), New York (4,200), and Wisconsin (3,520).

As of 2006, in Canada, there are 7,710 Norwegian speakers, of whom 3,420 reside in British Columbia, 1,360 in Alberta, and 1,145 in Ontario.

== Culture ==
Norwegian culture is closely linked to the country's history and geography. The unique Norwegian farm culture, sustained to this day, has resulted not only from scarce resources and a harsh climate but also from ancient property laws. In the 18th century, it brought about a strong romantic nationalistic movement, which is still visible in the Norwegian language and media. In the 19th century, Norwegian culture blossomed as efforts continued to achieve an independent identity in the areas of literature, art and music.

=== Cuisine ===
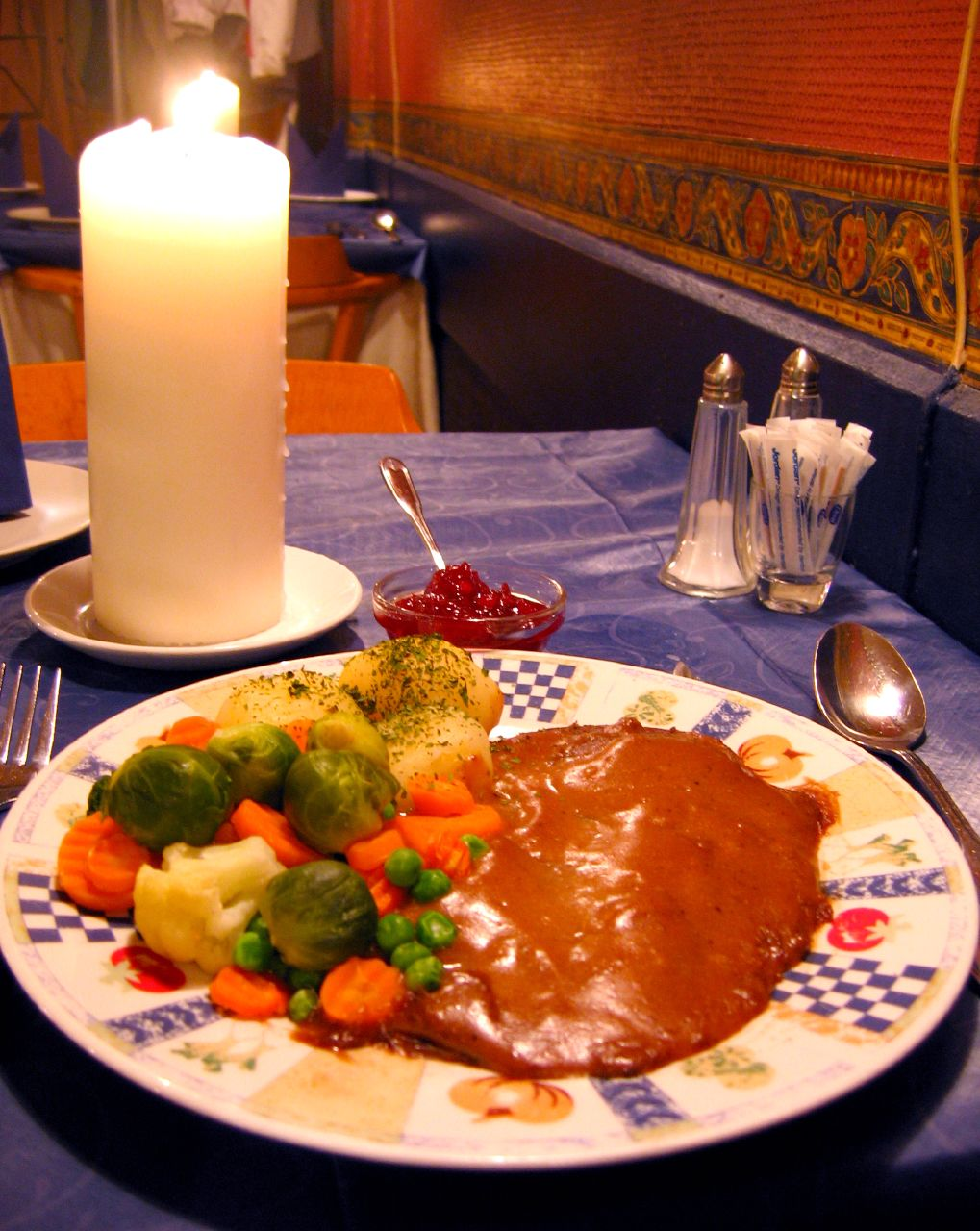
Reinsdyrsteik (Reindeer steak), a traditional Norwegian dish served with lingonberry jam. It is served from the south to the north of Norway.

Norway's culinary traditions show the influence of long seafaring and farming traditions with salmon (fresh and cured), herring (pickled or marinated), trout, codfish and other seafood balanced by cheeses, dairy products and excellent breads (predominantly dark/darker). Lefse is a common Norwegian potato flatbread, common around Christmas. For renowned Norwegian dishes, see lutefisk, smalahove, pinnekjøtt, Krotekake and fårikål.

=== Music ===
Along with the classical music of romantic composer Edvard Grieg and the modern music of Arne Nordheim, Norwegian black metal has become something of an export article in recent years.

Norway's classical performers include Leif Ove Andsnes, one of the world's more famous pianists, and Truls Mørk, an outstanding cellist.

The jazz scene in Norway is also thriving. Jan Garbarek, Mari Boine, Arild Andersen, and Bugge Wesseltoft are internationally recognised while Paal Nilssen-Love, Supersilent, Jaga Jazzist and Wibutee are becoming world-class artists of the younger generation.

Norway has a strong folk music tradition which remains popular to this day. Among the most prominent folk musicians are Hardanger fiddlers Andrea Een, Olav Jørgen Hegge, Vidar Lande and Annbjørg Lien, violinist Susanne Lundeng, and vocalists Agnes Buen Garnås, Kirsten Bråten Berg and Odd Nordstoga.

=== Celebrations ===
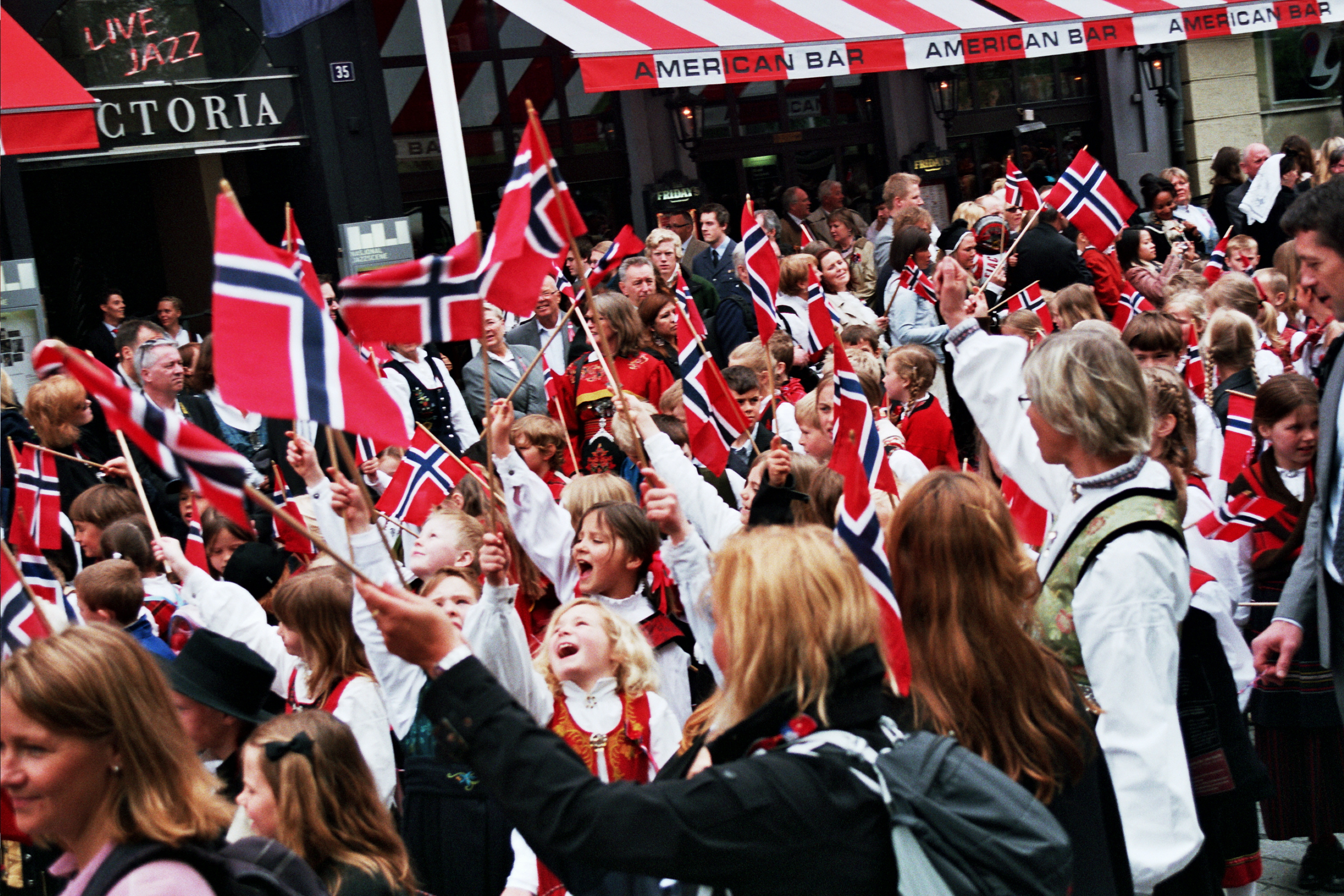
Norwegian Constitution Day, 17 May

Norwegians celebrate their national day on 17 May, dedicated to the Constitution of Norway. Many people wear bunad (traditional costumes) and most participate in or watch the Norwegian Constitution Day parade that day, consisting mostly of children, through the cities and towns. The national romanticist author Henrik Wergeland was the founder of the 17 May parade. Common Christian holidays are also celebrated, the most important being Christmas (called Jul in Norway after the pagan and early Viking winter solstice) and Easter (Påske). In Norway, the Santa (called Nissen) comes at Christmas Eve, the 24 December, with the presents, not the morning after as in many English speaking countries. He usually comes late in the evening, after the Christmas dinner many children consider long, boring and unnecessary.

Jonsok (St. John's Passing), or St. Hans (St. John's Day), i.e. 24 June, is also a commonly revered holiday. It marks midsummer and the beginning of summer vacation, and is often celebrated by lighting bonfires the evening before. In Northern areas of Norway, this day has 24 hours of light, while southern areas have only 17.5 hours.

=== Religion ===
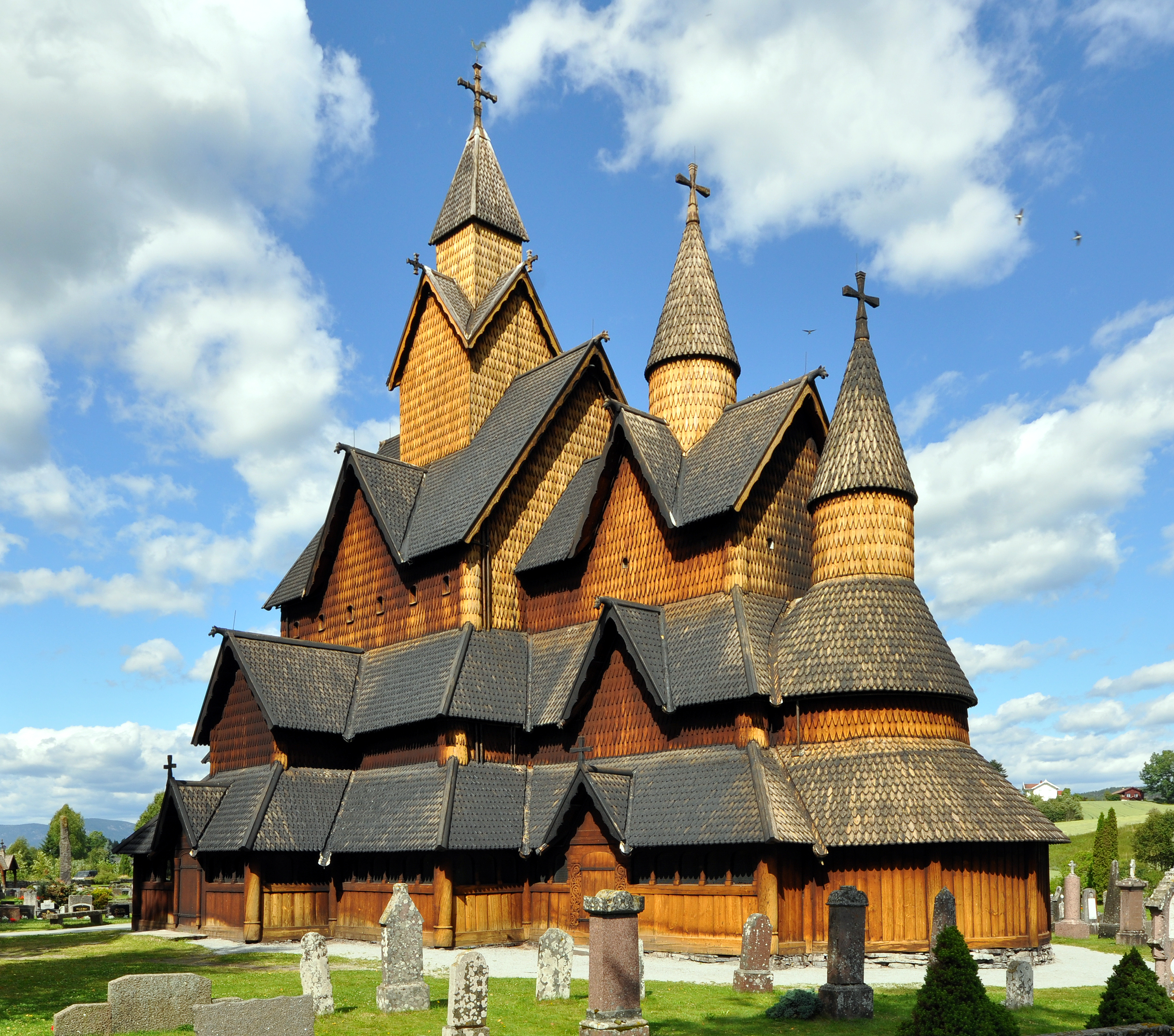
Heddal Stave Church is the largest stave church and one of the oldest preserved churches in Norway.

The conversion of Norway to Christianity from Norse paganism began in 1000. By the middle of the 11th century, Christianity had become well-established in Norway and had become dominant by the middle of the 12th century. The Norwegians were Catholics until the Danish king Christian III of Denmark forced them to convert to Lutheranism and established a state-governed church. The church undertook a program to convert the Sámi in the 16th and 17th century, with the program being largely successful.

In the 19th century, emigration from Norway for political and religious motives began and Lutheranism spread to the United States. As a result of this, many of the Norwegians remaining in Norway were religiously moderate; subsequently, church attendance declined throughout the 20th century, as reflected by 78% of the population stating that religion is unimportant in a Gallup poll and low weekly church attendance, at 2%, particularly when compared to that of North Dakota, the state in which Norwegians constitute approximately 30.4% of the population. Of all U.S. states, North Dakota has the lowest percentage of non-religious people and the largest number of churches per capita. It weekly church attendance is at 43%.

In Norway the Church of Norway and state are not entirely separated. An act approved in 2016 created the Church of Norway as an independent legal entity, effective from 1 January 2017. The Church of Norway was previously the country's official religion, and its central administrative functions were carried out by the Royal Ministry of Government Administration, Reform and Church Affairs until 2017. The Lutheran Church is still mentioned in the constitution, for example, the King is still required to profess a Lutheran faith. When baptised, children are registered in the Church of Norway's member register, leading to a large membership, although many people do not remain observant as adults. A majority of both ethnic Norwegians and Sámi are nominally Christian, but not necessarily observant. In Norway as of 2018, 70% of the population are members of the Lutheran Church, though only 47.1% answered "Yes" to the question "Do you believe in God?" in a 2018 European Values Study.

== Other terms used ==
The Norwegians are and have been referred to by other terms as well.

Some of them include:

- Nordmenn: a term used by Scandinavians to denote Norwegians. It translates as "Northmen". (Singular: Nordmann)
- Northmen: old term used by other European peoples to denote the peoples originating in the northern regions of Europe.
- Norsemen or Norse: Viking Age peoples of Nordic origin.
- Vikings: used in the Nordic countries to denote people who went raiding, pillaging or slave catching during the Viking Age. Used in a similar way by other peoples but can also mean Scandinavians in general.
- Minnewegian: colloquial term for a Norwegian Minnesotan.
- Norski: common name for Northern American Norwegians.
- Norrbagge: a Swedish (derogatory) term for Norwegians (first attested use in 1257) of uncertain meaning. Some claim that it is based on the root bagge meaning sheep's testicles in some Swedish dialects. Another explanation is that "bagge" refers to Bagaholm where Bohus Fortress lies, at an ancient border between Norway and Sweden. Nordbagge then means people who lives on the north (Swedish: norr) side of Bagaholm.

== See also ==
- Demographics of Norway
- List of Germanic peoples
- List of Norwegians
