= Swedish Costa Ricans =

Swedish Costa Ricans Sueco-costarricense
- (Sweden) (Costa Rica)

Regions with significant populations
- San José, Cartago and Heredia

Languages
- Spanish (Costa Rican Spanish), Swedish

Religion
- Christianism (mostly Pentecostalism and Lutheranism) and Atheism

Related ethnic groups
- Swedish people, White Costa Rican

Swedish Costa Ricans are citizens of Costa Rica who have Swedish ancestry. According to the 2012 census by the INEC, approximately 1,100 citizens from Sweden live in Costa Rica, mainly professionals and retired people.

== History ==
The first Swedish immigrants settled in Costa Rica in the mid-19th century when the President José María Castro Madriz made new reforms to attract European immigration to the country. During the first decades, the Swedish immigration was limited, because the government had more preference to the German, English, Italian and French immigration, the Swedish community in Costa Rica were mainly traders and Lutheran missionaries. The Swedish immigration in Costa Rica begins to gain importance in the late of the nineteenth century and the early of the twentieth century, when hundreds of Swedes came to the country by a policy, climate and attractive economy. Also, is created the first Swedish consulate in Costa Rica, and the Swedish club and the Swedish school in the country because in this moment, began to grow the number of Costa Rican children of Swedish descent.

== Characteristics ==
Sweden is a main flow of migration of retirees and pensioners in Costa Rica, along with other European countries, United States, Canada and some countries of Latin America. According to an estimate of the ARCR (Association of Residents of Costa Rica), at least 20% of all immigrants in Costa Rica are retirees, in their majority Americans, Canadians, Italians, Dutch, Swedish, Chinese and Australians. The main activity performed by retirees who emigrated, is tourism, because Costa Rica has attractive places as Escazú, Sta. Ana, Cariari, Rohrmoser and San Pedro.

== Swedish Costa Ricans ==
Swedish Costa Ricans, in relation to those of Costa Ricans of Spanish and Italian descent, are less numerous. The majority are concentrated in urban areas while some live in rural areas. Around 8.000 to 13.000 Costa Ricans have Swedish ancestry, some surnames are known in the country: Jonsson, Eriksson, Andersson, Hansson and Berg. Many Swedish immigrants were missionaries of the past, the majority of Swedish Costa Ricans are Protestants, although there are some atheists.

== Swedish culture in Costa Rica ==
=== Celebration of the Saint Lucy's Day ===
The Saint Lucy's Day is not an official celebration in Costa Rica, but it is celebrated in some Lutheran churches in Costa Rica founded by some Swedish missionaries, with other missionaries from Denmark, Norway, Finland and Iceland.

=== Swedish language ===
Some schools in the country teach the Swedish language. Due to the arrival of Swedish entrepreneurs, the Swedish language has become more important in the country, but not required to learn it.

=== Relations between Sweden and Costa Rica ===
- The Swedish Embassy in Costa Rica Sweden Costa Rica

Some Swedish companies or companies with franchises in Costa Rica are: Ericsson, ABB, NCC, SCA, Accenture, Volvo Construction, Volvo personbilar, Volvo lastvagnar, Scania Elektrolux, Elof Hansson, Atlas Copco, Sandvik, Oriflame and De Laval. There are also Swedish cooperation in Costa Rica.

== See also ==
- Swedish diaspora
- Costa Rican people
- Immigration to Costa Rica
