= Norwegian New Zealanders =

Norwegian New Zealanders Norske newzealendere
Total population
- 828 (Norwegian born); 1,400 (Norwegian ancestry); 0.03% of New Zealand's population

Regions with significant populations
- Manawatū-Whanganui, Norsewood, Dannevirke, Wellington

Languages
- New Zealand English · Norwegian

Religion
- Protestant · Roman Catholic

Related ethnic groups
- Norwegians · Norwegian Australians · Norwegian Americans · Norwegian Canadians

Norwegian New Zealanders (Norwegian: Norske newzealendere) are New Zealanders of Norwegian ancestry, the majority of whom are part of the Norwegian diaspora.

== History ==
Two Norwegian settlements were established in New Zealand, one in Norsewood (located in the Seventy Mile Bush), and the other in the Manawatu, both in the southern half of the North Island. The emigrants arrived there from 1868. In 1878 the number of Norwegian-born was said to be 1,213, and emigration from Norway died down then.

Norsewood in New Zealand's Seventy Mile Bush started as a Norwegian settlement in 1872. In 1881 New Zealand had 1,271 Norway-born residents, in 1901 there were 1,279.

=== Students ===
New Zealand and Australia are two of the most popular countries for Norwegian students. There are currently about 200 Norwegians studying in New Zealand. There are also some 2,500 Norwegian students in Australia. Half of the Norwegian students in New Zealand and Australia are members of ANSA - the Association of Norwegian Students Abroad.

== Notable Norwegian New Zealanders ==
=== Actors ===
- Russell Crowe

=== Politicians ===
- Teremoana Tapi Taio (Politician of the Cook Islands)

=== Writers ===
- Will Lawson, novelist and poet (born in England, but spent later life in Australia)

== See also ==
- European New Zealanders
- Europeans in Oceania
- Immigration to New Zealand
- New Zealand–Norway relations
- Pākehā
- Norwegian Australians
