= Norwegian diaspora =

Norwegian emigrants and their descendants

Map of the Norwegian diaspora in the world. Norway + 1,000,000 + 100,000 + 10,000 + 1,000

The Norwegian diaspora consists of Norwegian emigrants and their descendants, especially those that became Norwegian Americans. Emigrants also became Norwegian Canadians, Norwegian Australians, Norwegian New Zealanders, Norwegian Brazilians, Kola Norwegians and Norwegian South Africans.

Offices and library of the Norwegian-American Historical Association in Northfield, Minnesota

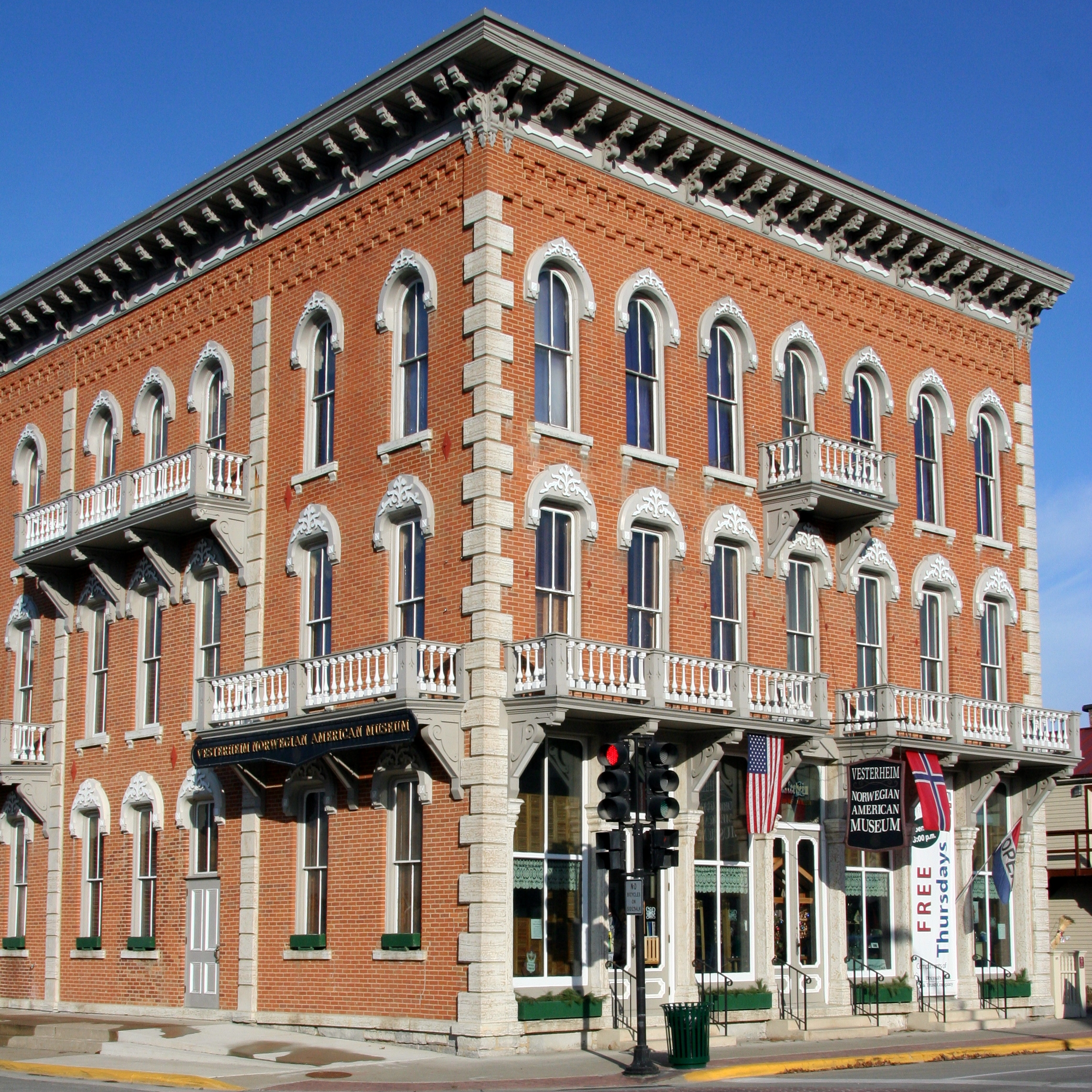
Vesterheim Norwegian-American Museum in Decorah, Iowa

== History ==
Norsemen left the area that is now the modern state of Norway during the Viking Age expansion, with results including the settlement of Iceland and the conquest of Normandy.

In the 1500s and 1600s there was a small scattering of Norwegian people and culture as Norwegian tradesmen moved along the routes of the timber trade.

The 19th century wave of Norwegian emigration began in 1825. The Midwestern United States, especially the states of Wisconsin and Minnesota, was the destination of most people who left Norway. The first modern Norwegian-American settlement in Minnesota was at Norwegian Ridge, in what is now Spring Grove, Minnesota.

Early emigrant communities in the United States were an enthusiastic market for books written in Norwegian principally from the 1890s to 1930s. Torbjørg Lie (1855-1924), a popular writer for the Decorah-Posten, imagined her readers "not so much adopting a new country as living in a diaspora." Meanwhile, newspapers in Norway were also eager to publish letters that recent emigrants had written home, telling of their experiences in foreign countries.

According to scholar Daniel Judah Elazar, "It was the Norwegian diaspora in the United States which initiated the separation of Norway from Sweden, which led to Norwegian independence in 1905." The Norwegian-American community overwhelmingly favored independence of Norway from Sweden, and collecting money for Norwegian rifle clubs in case the conflict should become violent. In 1884, the Minneapolis chapter of Den Norsk-Amerikanske Venstreforening sent 4,000 kroners to Norway's Liberal Party (the party that favored independence.) Norwegian-Americans campaigned enthusiastically for the United States to recognize Norway's independence from Sweden, with petitions and letters arriving in Washington, D.C. from most major cities. One petition from Chicago's Norwegian-American community bore 20,000 signatures. President Theodore Roosevelt did not change his stance, however, and remained neutral until after Sweden accepted the change.

As of 2006 there are over 5,000,000 Norwegian Americans. In Canada in a 2006 survey, 432,515 Canadians reported Norwegian ancestry. 55,475 Americans spoke Norwegian at home as of 2000, and the American Community Survey in 2005 showed that 39,524 people use the language at home.

== Ties to the homeland ==
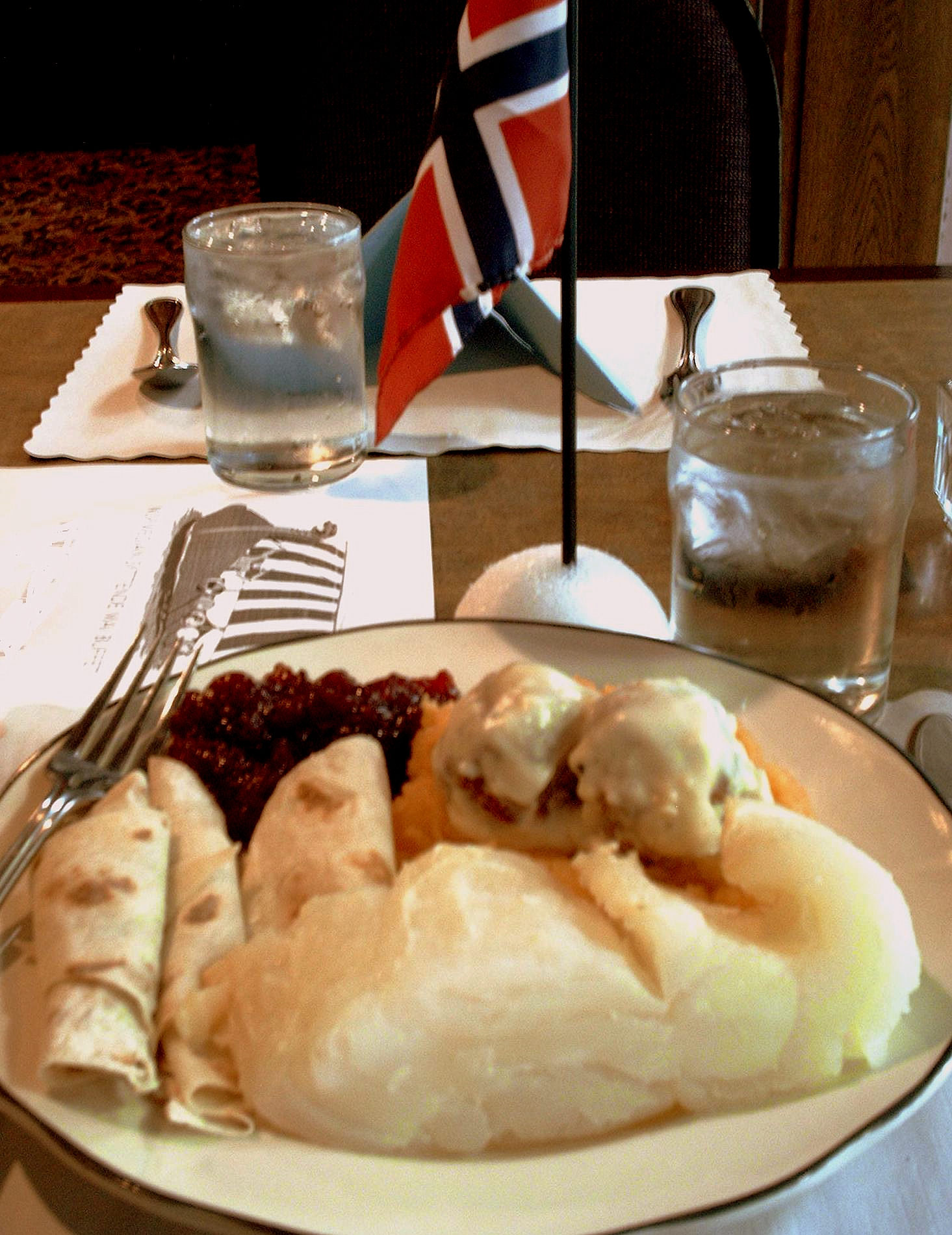
Norwegian Constitution Day dinner in the United States with lutefisk, rutabaga, lingonberries, and lefse

While modern Norway has a wary relationship with immigrants from non-European cultures, Norwegian emigration to the United States from the 19th century has fostered a flourishing Norwegian culture of the diaspora.

The Norwegian Emigrant Museum in Hamar, Norway is dedicated to "collecting, preserving and disseminating knowledge about Norwegian emigration, and to the preservation of cultural ties between Norway and those of Norwegian ancestry throughout the world," according to the museum's website, which states that a million Norwegians emigrated to other countries around the world between 1825 and 2000.

The Sons of Norway, originally a small fraternal benefit organization, now has more than 60,000 members in America and almost 3,000 in Canada. It is dedicated to promoting Norwegian culture and traditions.

The Vesterheim Norwegian-American Museum in Decorah, Iowa, is the oldest and most comprehensive museum in the United States devoted to a single immigrant ethnic group. It was founded in 1877 in association with nearby Luther College and re-dedicated in 1975 in a ceremony involving King Olav V of Norway. King Harald V of Norway was present in October 2012 for the celebration of Luther College's sequicentennial.

Self-identified Norwegians, whether in Norway or elsewhere, celebrate "Syttende Mai" on May 17 as Norwegian Constitution Day. They may hold a children's parade, wear traditional clothing, or display ribbons of red, white, and blue. Norwegians in Sweden maintain their own Norwegian band "Det Norske Korps" for these celebrations.

Members of the Norwegian emigrant community in the United States took a special pride in Norway hosting the 1994 Winter Olympics in Lillehammer.

== Gallery ==
Altar of Mindekirken Norwegian Lutheran Church in Minneapolis, MN

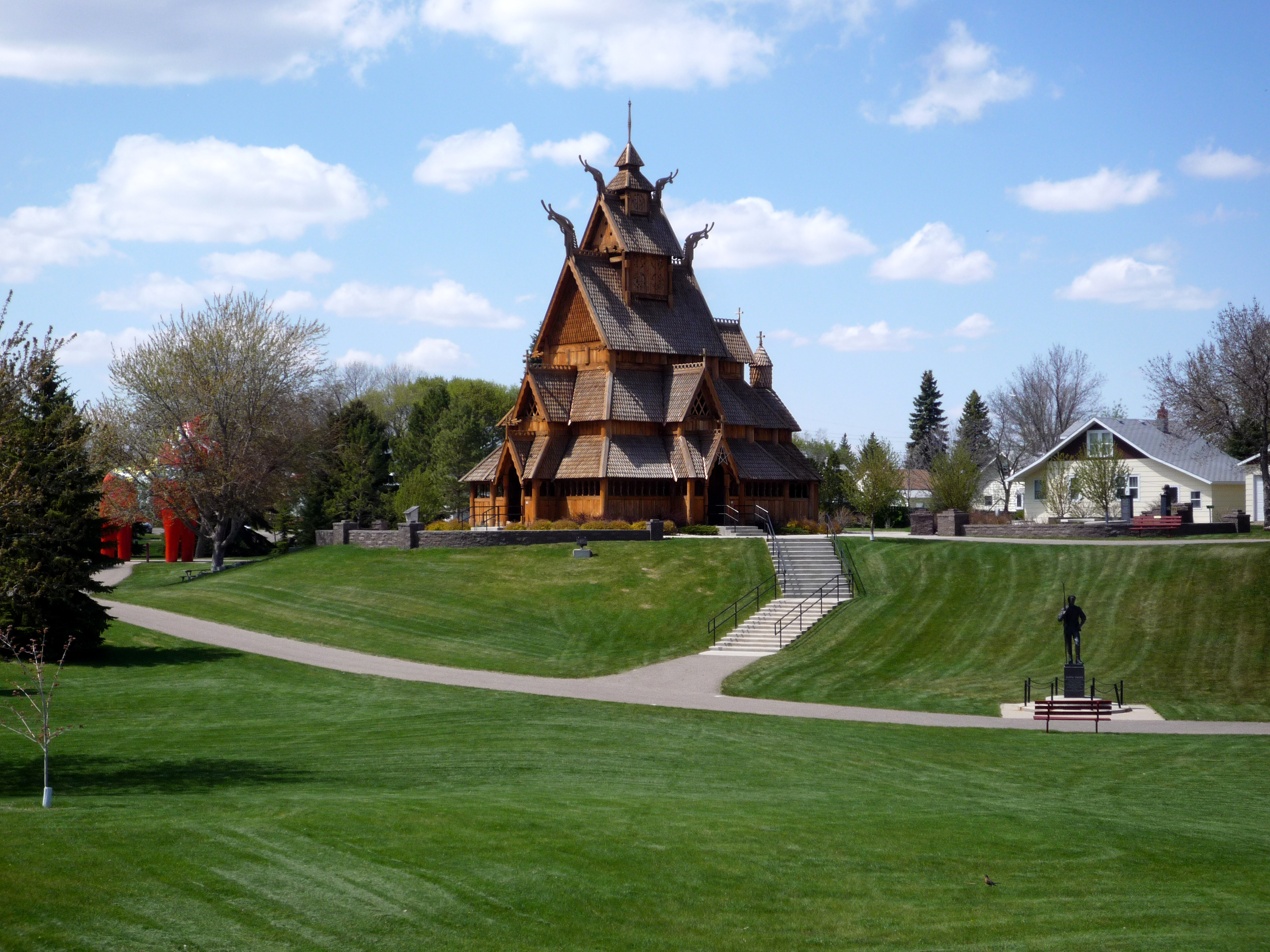
Scandinavian Heritage Park in Minot, North Dakota

== See also ==
- Sons of Norway
- List of US Communities where Norwegian is spoken
- Norse colonization of the Americas
- Scandinavian migration to the United Kingdom
- Scandinavian diaspora
