= Association of Norwegian Students Abroad =

International Norwegian student organization

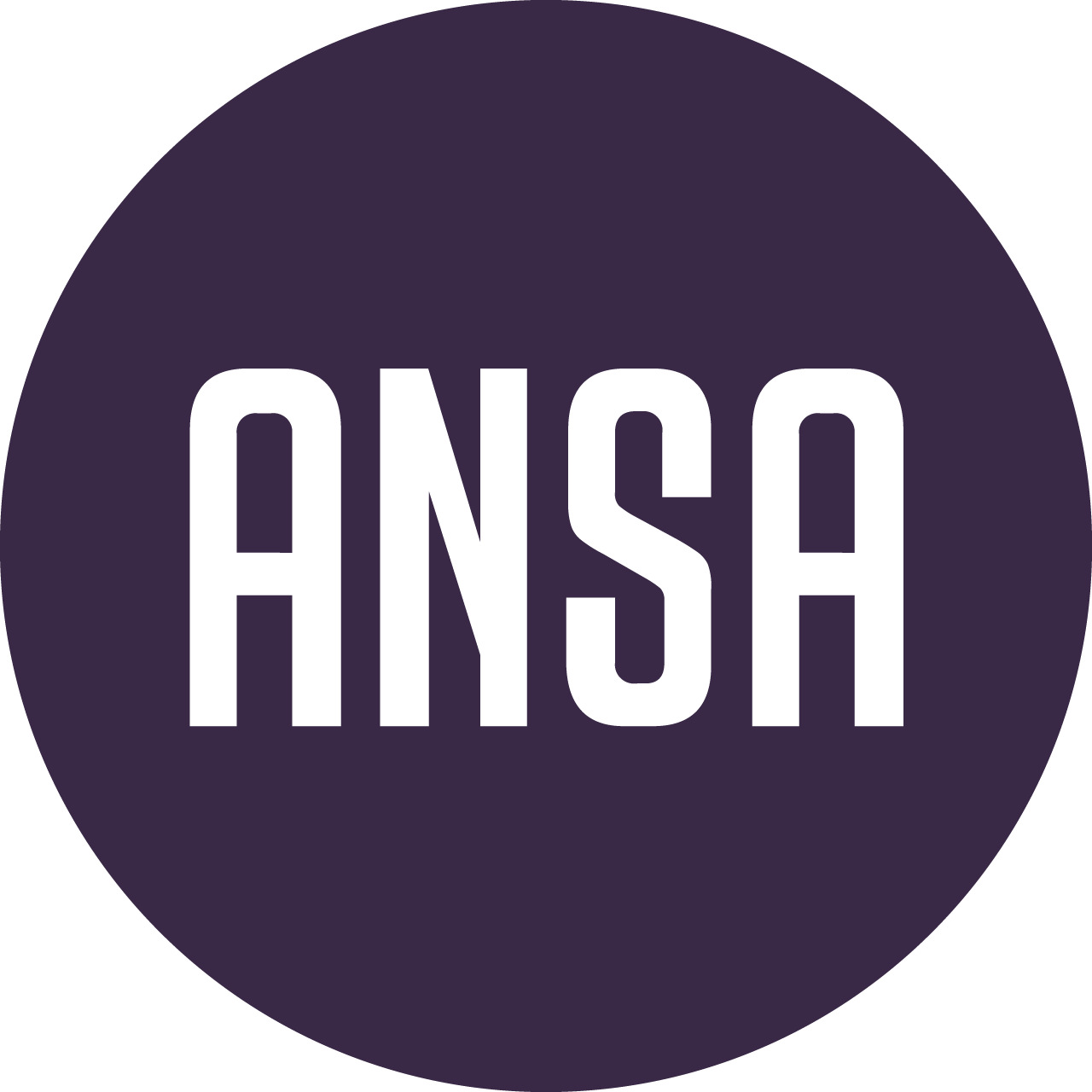
- Formation: 1956
- Headquarters: Norway Biskopgunnerusgate 2, 0184 Oslo
- Location: 1,200 in more than 90 countries
- Members: 10,000
- President: Øyvind Bryhn Pettersen
- Secretary-General: Hanne Refsdal
- Main organ: General Assembly (annual)
- Staff: 13
- Volunteers: over 500
- Website: www.ansa.no E-Mail: studinfo@ansa.no

The Association of Norwegian Students Abroad (ANSA, in Norwegian: Samskipnaden for norske studenter i utlandet) is a non-profit and membership based organisation aiming to voice the educational, cultural, political and economic interests of Norwegian students studying outside Norway and to promote overseas students as a valuable resource to domestic employers.

As of 2009/2010, 20,165 Norwegian students were studying abroad. In 2014 ANSA had over 10,000 members at over 1,200 educational institutions in more than 90 countries.

ANSA in particular works to influence rules and regulations governing student grants and loans, arguing that all students should have the right to study any subject in any country as they wish. The Norwegian government has been funding higher education for Norwegian students abroad for more than 60 years, with the Norwegian State Educational Loan Fund (Lånekassen) providing students with loans and grants. ANSA was founded by Norwegian students in 1956 to address difficulties students encountered in dealing with Lånekassen.

The organisation targets services at students prior to, during, and after studies abroad. A range of membership benefits are central in attracting students as members. ANSA's Information Centre for higher education abroad is funded by the Norwegian Ministry of Education and Research to provide unbiased advice on higher education abroad. The Membership Department deals with enquiries from potential and current members, while ANSA's Student Adviser provides advice to students encountering problems during their studies abroad, such as with regard to their university, their insurance, or Lånekassen.

== Headquarters and Governance Structures ==
ANSA is staffed by 12 full-time employees. The Secretary-General heads the office in Oslo.

The President of ANSA is elected at the annual general assembly. The President's main responsibility is lobbying for ANSA’s political priorities towards the Norwegian authorities. The President is also chair of ANSA’s Board and main spokesperson of ANSA.

The board of ANSA consists of six students abroad, two students who previously have studied abroad, ANSA’s president and a representative for the employees at ANSA. The Board is responsible for ANSA’s political priorities and the main goals of the organisation.

Among ANSA's members are over 500 volunteers who organise various social and cultural events and represent ANSA at their places of study.
