= Norwegian Australians =

Norwegian Australians Norskaustraliere
Total population
- 3,710 (by birth, 2011); 23,037 (by ancestry, 2011)

Regions with significant populations
- Melbourne, Tasmania, Adelaide, Sydney, Perth

Languages
- Australian English, Norwegian

Religion
- Irreligion, Christianity

Related ethnic groups
- Norwegians, Norwegian New Zealanders, Danish Australians, Swedish Australians

Norwegian Australians (Norwegian: Norskaustraliere) are Australian citizens of Norwegian ancestry.

== History ==
An organised European immigration to Australia was initiated in 1788. Most of the early emigrants were deported from Britain to the "Penal Colony". The most famous was probably Knud Geelmuyden Bull (1811 - 1889), from Bergen, a painter and forger of coins who was deported to Hobart, Tasmania.

In 2008, 800 people celebrated the Norwegian Constitution Day in Brisbane. The 17 May celebrations in Brisbane have in recent years been considered to be the largest celebration of the Norwegian national day in the Southern Hemisphere.

Lund (2012) has estimated that between 1870 and 1912 approximately 2000 Norwegians immigrated to Queensland out of an estimated 6500 who came to Australia during this same period. His study of Norwegians in Queensland, identified largely dispersed settlement patterns across the state, however there was one notable concentration - "The largest Norwegian agricultural settlement was found within a fairly limited area within the Darling Downs East census district, comprising flats and valleys bordered by the mountains of the Great Dividing Range. In particular, they made new homes for themselves on the rich soils surrounding the little town of Yangan; in nearby localities such as Swan Creek, Swanfels, Killarney, Emu Vale and Freestone.

The Norwegian language was generally not retained for very long by these early settlers, in most cases only a matter of a few years. In reference to Scandinavians in Australia, Koivukangas (1986) posits that marriage to women of British heritage was a significant factor contributing to this decline and supporting widespread assimilation.

== Students ==
In 2021, a total of 391 Norwegian students studied at universities in Australia. Crown Princess Ingrid Alexandra of Norway has been a student at the University of Sydney since August 2025.

Half of the Norwegian students in Australia and New Zealand are members of ANSA — the Association of Norwegian Students Abroad. The Norwegian Embassy in Canberra cooperates closely with ANSA Australia, and has for instance its own column in ANSA Australia's magazine "ANZA".

== Notable Norwegian Australians ==
Name	Birth and Death	Occupation	Notes
Wally Koochew	1887 – 1932	Australian rules football Player	Chinese and Norwegian descent
Henry Lawson	1867 – 1922	Writer and poet	English and Norwegian descent
Will Lawson	1876 – 1957	Writer and poet	English and Norwegian descent
Chris Leikvoll	1975 –	Rugby league player	Norwegian descent
Annalise Braakensiek	1972 – 2019	Model, actress and TV presenter	Czech, German and Norwegian descent
Anita Hegh	1972 –	Actor	Norwegian and Swedish-Estonian descent
Dominic Purcell	1970 –	Actor	Norwegian, English and Irish descent
Mary Hansen	1966 – 2002	Singer	Danish and Norwegian descent
Jasmuheen	1957 –	Breatharian	Norwegian descent
Derek Hansen	1944 –	Novelist and story writer	Norwegian descent
Justus Jorgensen	1893 – 1975	Artist and Architect	Norwegian descent
Michael Sukkar	1981 –	Politician	Norwegian and Lebanese descent

== See also ==
- Australia–Norway relations
- European Australians
- The Archer brothers
- Eidsvold, Queensland, after Eidsvoll, Norway
- Norwegian diaspora
- Norwegian New Zealanders
- Swedish Australians
